= Sailing at the 2020 Summer Olympics – Qualification =

This article details the qualifying phase for sailing at the 2020 Summer Olympics (postponed to 2021 due to the COVID-19 pandemic). 350 quota places for the Games are entitled to the sailors coming from their respective NOCs, based on the results at designated regattas supervised by World Sailing. Host nation Japan has been guaranteed one quota place in each of the ten classes.

The qualification period commences at the 2018 Sailing World Championships in Aarhus, Denmark, where about forty percent of the total quota will be awarded to the highest finishing NOCs. Six places will be available in the men's Laser and women's Laser Radial classes at the 2018 Asian Games and 2019 Pan American Games, whereas sixty-one more will be distributed to the sailors at the World Championships for all boats in 2019. Moving towards 2021 because of the consequent Olympic postponement and the COVID-19 pandemic, continental qualification regattas will be held to decide the remainder of the total quota, while two spots each in the one-person dinghy classes will be granted to eligible NOCs through the Tripartite Commission Invitation.

== Timeline ==
Event	Date	Venue
2018 Sailing World Championships	July 30 – August 12, 2018	(Denmark) Aarhus
2018 Asian Games	August 18 – September 2, 2018	(Indonesia) Jakarta
2019 Finn European Championships	May 10–18, 2019	(Greece) Athens
2019 Laser World Championships	July 1–9, 2019	(Japan) Sakaiminato
2019 Women's Laser Radial World Championships	July 16–24, 2019	(Japan) Sakaiminato
2019 Pan American Games	July 26 – August 11, 2019	(Peru) Paracas
2019 470 World Championships	August 2–9, 2019	(Japan) Enoshima
2019 RS:X Windsurfing World Championships	September 22–28, 2019	(Italy) Torbole
2019 Nacra 17 World Championships	December 3–8, 2019	(New Zealand) Auckland
2019 49er & 49er FX World Championships	December 3–8, 2019	(New Zealand) Auckland
Africa Qualification Events
2019 African Sailing Championships (RS:X, Laser, Laser Radial)	October 6–12, 2019	(Algeria) Algiers
2020 African Sailing Championships (470)	January 12–18, 2020	(Angola) Luanda
2021 Lanzarote International Regatta (Nacra 17)	March 23–28, 2021	(Spain) Lanzarote (Note: In response to the COVID-19 pandemic, World Sailing supports the decision from the IOC and Tokyo 2020 organizing committee on the postponement of the Olympics; therefore, the qualification system will be revised with the remaining meets scheduled to happen by late 2020 or early 2021.)
2021 Mussanah Open Championships (49er and 49erFX)	April 1–8, 2021	(Oman) Al-Mussanah
2021 Finn Gold Cup	May 4–12, 2021	(Portugal) Porto
Asia Qualification Events
2019 Sailing World Cup Enoshima (Finn)	August 25 – September 1, 2019	(Japan) Enoshima
2019 Asian Sailing Championships (470)	December 16–21, 2019	(China) Shenzhen
2021 Asian Sailing Championships (Nacra 17)	March 1–6, 2021	(China) Shanghai
2021 Mussanah Open Championships (RS:X, Laser, Laser Radial, 49er, 49erFX)	April 1–8, 2021	(Oman) Al-Mussanah
Europe Qualification Events
2020 RS:X European Championships	November 22–28, 2020	(Portugal) Vilamoura
2021 470 World Championships	March 5–13, 2021	(Portugal) Vilamoura
2021 Lanzarote International Regatta (49er, 49erFX, and Nacra 17)	March 23–28, 2021	(Spain) Lanzarote
2021 Vilamoura International Regatta (Laser and Laser Radial)	April 17–24, 2021	(Portugal) Vilamoura
2021 Finn Gold Cup	May 4–12, 2021	(Portugal) Porto
North America Qualification Events
2019 Pan American Games (49er, 49erFX and Nacra 17)	July 26 – August 11, 2019	(Peru) Paracas
2020 Sailing World Cup Miami (RS:X, Finn, Laser, Laser Radial, and 470)	January 19–25, 2020	(United States) Miami
South America Qualification Events
2019 Pan American Games (49er, 49erFX and Nacra 17)	July 26 – August 11, 2019	(Peru) Paracas
2019 Copa Brasil (Laser, Laser Radial, Finn)	November 25–30, 2019	(Brazil) Rio de Janeiro
2020 South American Sailing Championships (RS:X)	February 9–15, 2020	(Argentina) Mar del Plata
2020 South American Sailing Championships (470)	February 11–17, 2020	(Argentina) Mar del Plata
Oceania Qualification Events
2019 Finn Gold Cup	December 16–21, 2019	(Australia) Melbourne
2020 Sail Melbourne International (470)	January 17–21, 2020	(Australia) Melbourne
2020 Nacra 17 World Championships	February 8–15, 2020	(Australia) Geelong
2020 49er & 49er FX World Championships	February 8–15, 2020	(Australia) Geelong
2020 Laser World Championships	February 9–16, 2020	(Australia) Melbourne
2020 Women's Laser Radial World Championships	February 21–28, 2020	(Australia) Melbourne
2020 RS:X Windsurfing World Championships	February 23–29, 2020	(Australia) Sorrento

=== Quota places ===
Below are the number of boats. 470, 49er, 49erFX, and Nacra 17 classes have crew of 2 people per boat.

Event	2018 WC	2018 ASG	2019 PAG	2019 WC	AFR	ASI	OCE	EUR	NAM	SAM	Hosts	Tri.	Total
Men
RS:X class	10	0	0	8	1	1	1	1	1	1	1	0	25
Laser class	14	1	2	5	2	1	1	2	2	2	1	2	35
Finn class	8	0	0	4	1	1	1	1	1	1	1	0	19
470 class	8	0	0	4	1	1	1	1	1	1	1	0	19
49er class	8	0	0	4	1	1	1	1	1	1	1	0	19
Women
RS:X class	11	0	0	9	1	1	1	1	1	1	1	0	27
Laser Radial class	18	1	2	10	2	1	1	2	2	2	1	2	44
470 class	8	0	0	6	1	1	1	1	1	1	1	0	21
49erFX class	8	0	0	7	0	1	1	1	1	1	1	0	21
Mixed
Nacra 17	8	0	0	5	1	1	1	1	1	1	1	0	20

== Qualification summary ==
Nation	Men					Women				Mixed	Total	
Nation	RS:X	Laser	Finn	470	49er	RS:X	Laser Radial	470	49erFX	Nacra 17	Boats	Athletes
Algeria	Yes					Yes					2	2
American Samoa				Yes							1	2
Angola				Yes							1	2
Antigua and Barbuda							Yes				1	1
Argentina	Yes	Yes	Yes			Yes	Yes	Yes	Yes	Yes	8	11
Australia		Yes	Yes	Yes	Yes		Yes	Yes	Yes	Yes	8	13
Austria					Yes				Yes	Yes	3	6
Belarus	Yes						Yes				2	2
Belgium		Yes					Yes		Yes		3	4
Brazil		Yes	Yes	Yes	Yes	Yes		Yes	Yes	Yes	8	13
Canada			Yes	Yes	Yes	Yes	Yes		Yes		6	9
Chile		Yes									1	1
China	Yes		Yes	Yes		Yes	Yes	Yes	Yes	Yes	8	12
Croatia		Yes			Yes		Yes				3	4
Cyprus	Yes	Yes				Yes	Yes				4	4
Czech Republic	Yes										1	1
Denmark					Yes	Yes	Yes		Yes	Yes	5	8
Egypt		Yes					Yes				2	2
El Salvador		Yes									1	1
Estonia		Yes				Yes					2	2
Fiji							Yes				1	1
Finland		Yes				Yes	Yes			Yes	4	5
France	Yes	Yes		Yes	Yes	Yes	Yes	Yes	Yes	Yes	9	14
Germany		Yes			Yes		Yes	Yes	Yes	Yes	6	10
Great Britain	Yes	Yes	Yes	Yes	Yes	Yes	Yes	Yes	Yes	Yes	10	15
Greece	Yes		Yes	Yes		Yes	Yes	Yes			6	
Guatemala		Yes					Yes				2	2
Hong Kong	Yes					Yes	Yes				3	3
Hungary		Yes	Yes			Yes	Yes				4	4
India		Yes			Yes		Yes				3	4
Ireland					Yes		Yes				2	3
Israel	Yes					Yes	Yes	Yes			4	5
Italy	Yes			Yes		Yes	Yes	Yes		Yes	6	9
Japan	Yes	Yes	Yes	Yes	Yes	Yes	Yes	Yes	Yes	Yes	10	15
Lithuania	Yes						Yes				2	2
Malaysia		Yes					Yes	Yes			3	4
Mexico	Yes		Yes			Yes	Yes				4	4
Montenegro		Yes									1	1
Mozambique							Yes	Yes			2	3
Netherlands	Yes		Yes		Yes	Yes	Yes	Yes	Yes		7	10
New Zealand		Yes	Yes	Yes	Yes				Yes	Yes	6	10
Norway	Yes	Yes	Yes				Yes		Yes	Yes	6	8
Papua New Guinea		Yes					Yes				2	2
Peru		Yes				Yes	Yes		Yes		4	5
Poland	Yes				Yes	Yes	Yes	Yes	Yes		6	9
Portugal				Yes	Yes		Yes				3	5
Puerto Rico										Yes	1	2
ROC	Yes	Yes		Yes		Yes	Yes				5	6
Saint Lucia		Yes					Yes				2	2
Samoa		Yes									1	1
Seychelles		Yes									1	1
Singapore		Yes				Yes			Yes		3	4
Slovenia		Yes						Yes			2	3
South Africa			Yes		Yes						2	3
South Korea	Yes	Yes		Yes							3	4
Spain	Yes	Yes	Yes	Yes	Yes	Yes	Yes	Yes	Yes	Yes	10	15
Sweden		Yes	Yes	Yes			Yes	Yes		Yes	6	9
Switzerland	Yes				Yes		Yes	Yes			4	6
Thailand	Yes					Yes	Yes				3	3
Trinidad and Tobago		Yes									1	1
Tunisia									Yes	Yes	2	4
Turkey	Yes		Yes	Yes		Yes	Yes	Yes			6	8
United States	Yes	Yes	Yes	Yes		Yes	Yes	Yes	Yes	Yes	9	13
Uruguay							Yes			Yes	2	3
Venezuela			Yes								1	1
Total: 65 NOCs	25	35	19	19	19	27	44	21	21	20	250	350

== Men's events ==
=== Windsurfer – RS:X ===
#	Nation	Qualification Tournament	Place in Event	Sailor	Sailor at Games
1	Japan	Host Country	—N/a	—N/a	Makoto Tomizawa
2	Netherlands	2018 Worlds	1	Dorian van Rijsselberghe	Kiran Badloe
3	France	2018 Worlds	3	Louis Giard	Thomas Goyard
4	Great Britain	2018 Worlds	4	Kieran Holmes-Martin	Tom Squires
5	Poland	2018 Worlds	5	Pawel Tarnowski	Piotr Myszka
6	Italy	2018 Worlds	6	Mattia Camboni	Mattia Camboni
7	Greece	2018 Worlds	7	Byron Kokkalanis	Byron Kokkalanis
8	China	2018 Worlds	9	Bi Kun	Bi Kun
9	Spain	2018 Worlds	13	Iván Pastor	Ángel Granda
10	Israel	2018 Worlds	14	Ofek Elimelech	Yoav Cohen
11	Norway	2018 Worlds	17	Sebastian Wang-Hansen	Endre Funnemark
12	South Korea	2019 Worlds	9	Cho Won-woo	Cho Won-woo
13	Hong Kong	2019 Worlds	13	Michael Cheng	Michael Cheng
14	Belarus	2019 Worlds	23	Artem Javadav	Mikita Tsirkun
15	Switzerland	2019 Worlds	25	Mateo Sanz Lanz	Mateo Sanz Lanz
16	Lithuania	2019 Worlds	33	Juozas Bernotas	Juozas Bernotas
17	United States	2019 Worlds	42	Pedro Pascual	Pedro Pascual
18	Cyprus	2019 Worlds	43	Andreas Cariolou	Andreas Cariolou
19	Czech Republic	2019 Worlds	46	Karel Lavický	Karel Lavický
20	Turkey	2019 Worlds	54	Onur Cavit Biriz	Onur Cavit Biriz
21	Algeria	2019 African	1	Hamza Bouras	Hamza Bouras
22	Thailand	2021 Mussanah Open (Asia)	1	Natthaphong Phonoppharat	Natthaphong Phonoppharat
—	New Zealand	2020 Worlds (Oceania)	54	Antonio Cozzolino	
23	ROC	2020 European	20	Aleksandr Askerov	Aleksandr Askerov
24	Mexico	2020 World Cup (NAM)	2	Ignacio Berenguer	Ignacio Berenguer
25	Argentina	2020 South American	1	Francisco Saubidet	Francisco Saubidet

=== One-person dinghy – Laser ===
#	Nation	Qualification Tournament	Place in Event	Sailor	Sailor at Games
1	Japan	Host Country	—N/a	—N/a	Kenji Nanri
2	Cyprus	2018 Worlds	1	Pavlos Kontides	Pavlos Kontides
3	Australia	2018 Worlds	2	Matthew Wearn	Matthew Wearn
4	Germany	2018 Worlds	3	Philipp Buhl	Philipp Buhl
5	New Zealand	2018 Worlds	4	Sam Meech	Sam Meech
6	Great Britain	2018 Worlds	5	Elliot Hanson	Elliot Hanson
7	Norway	2018 Worlds	6	Hermann Tomasgaard	Hermann Tomasgaard
8	France	2018 Worlds	9	Jean-Baptiste Bernaz	Jean-Baptiste Bernaz
9	United States	2018 Worlds	11	Charlie Buckingham	Charlie Buckingham
10	Finland	2018 Worlds	12	Kaarle Tapper	Kaarle Tapper
11	Estonia	2018 Worlds	17	Karl-Martin Rammo	Karl-Martin Rammo
12	Brazil	2018 Worlds	19	João Pedro Souto	Robert Scheidt
13	Croatia	2018 Worlds	20	Tonči Stipanović	Tonči Stipanović
14	Peru	2018 Worlds	21	Stefano Peschiera	Stefano Peschiera
15	South Korea	2018 Worlds	22	Ha Jee-min	Ha Jee-min
16	Malaysia	2018 Asian Games	2	Khairulnizam Afendy	Khairulnizam Afendy
17	Sweden	2019 Worlds	13	Jesper Stålheim	Jesper Stålheim
18	Argentina	2019 Worlds	14	Francisco Guaragna	Francisco Guaragna
19	ROC	2019 Worlds	17	Sergey Komissarov	Sergey Komissarov
20	Hungary	2019 Worlds	20	Benjámin Vadnai	Benjámin Vadnai
21	Slovenia	2019 Worlds	26	Žan Luka Zelko	Žan Luka Zelko
—	Switzerland	2019 Worlds	30	Eliot Merceron	
22	Belgium	2019 Worlds	34	Wannes Van Laer	Wannes Van Laer
23	Guatemala	2019 Pan American	1	Juan Ignacio Maegli	Juan Ignacio Maegli
24	El Salvador	2019 Pan American	4	Enrique Arathoon	Enrique Arathoon
25	Seychelles	2019 African	1	Rodney Govinden	Rodney Govinden
26	Egypt	2019 African	2	Aly Badawy	Aly Badawy
27	Singapore	2021 Mussanah Open (Asia)	1	Ryan Lo	Ryan Lo
28	India	2021 Mussanah Open (Asia)	2	Vishnu Saravanan	Vishnu Saravanan
29	Samoa	2020 Worlds (Oceania)	115	Eroni Leilua	Eroni Leilua
30	Papua New Guinea	2020 Worlds (Oceania)	123	Teariki Numa	Teariki Numa
31	Spain	Vilamoura Int'l Regatta (Europe)	9	Joel Rodríguez	Joel Rodríguez
—	Netherlands	Vilamoura Int'l Regatta (Europe)	11	Duko Bos	
32	Trinidad and Tobago	2020 World Cup (NAM)	4	Andrew Lewis	Andrew Lewis
33	Chile	2019 Copa Brasil (SAM)	1	Clemente Seguel	Clemente Seguel
34	Montenegro	Tripartite	—N/a	—N/a	Milivoj Dukić
35	Saint Lucia	Tripartite	—N/a	—N/a	Luc Chevrier

=== Heavyweight one-person dinghy – Finn ===
#	Nation	Qualification Tournament	Place in Event	Sailor	Sailor at Games
1	Japan	Host Country	—N/a	—N/a	Kazumasa Segawa
2	Hungary	2018 Worlds	1	Zsombor Berecz	Zsombor Berecz
3	Sweden	2018 Worlds	2	Max Salminen	Max Salminen
4	Netherlands	2018 Worlds	3	Pieter-Jan Postma	Nicholas Heiner
5	New Zealand	2018 Worlds	4	Josh Junior	Josh Junior
6	Canada	2018 Worlds	5	Tom Ramshaw	Tom Ramshaw
7	Argentina	2018 Worlds	7	Facundo Olezza	Facundo Olezza
8	Great Britain	2018 Worlds	8	Edward Wright	Giles Scott
9	Turkey	2018 Worlds	9	Alican Kaynar	Alican Kaynar
10	Brazil	2019 European (Worlds)	7	Jorge Zarif	Jorge Zarif
11	Norway	2019 European (Worlds)	9	Anders Pedersen	Anders Pedersen
12	United States	2019 European (Worlds)	11	Caleb Paine	Luke Muller
13	Greece	2019 European (Worlds)	13	Ioannis Mitakis	Ioannis Mitakis
14	South Africa	2021 Finn Gold Cup (Africa)	44	Leo Davis	Leo Davis
15	China	2019 World Cup (Asia)	19	He Chen	He Chen
16	Australia	2019 Finn Gold Cup (Oceania)	5	Jake Lilley	Jake Lilley
17	Spain	2021 Finn Gold Cup (Europe)	2	Joan Cardona	Joan Cardona
18	Mexico	2020 World Cup (NAM)	6	Juan Ignacio Pérez	Juan Ignacio Pérez
19	Venezuela	2019 Copa Brasil (SAM)	4	Andres Lage	Andres Lage

=== Two-person dinghy – 470 ===
#	Nation	Qualification Tournament	Place in Event	Sailor	Sailor at Games
1	Japan	Host Country	—N/a	—N/a	Keiju Okada; Jumpei Hokazono
2	France	2018 Worlds	1	Kevin Peponnet; Jérémie Mion	Kevin Peponnet; Jérémie Mion
3	Spain	2018 Worlds	3	Jordi Xammar; Nicolás Rodríguez	Jordi Xammar; Nicolás Rodríguez
4	Sweden	2018 Worlds	4	Anton Dahlberg; Fredrik Bergström	Anton Dahlberg; Fredrik Bergström
5	Australia	2018 Worlds	5	Mathew Belcher; William Ryan	Mathew Belcher; William Ryan
6	United States	2018 Worlds	7	Stuart McNay; David Hughes	Stuart McNay; David Hughes
7	Italy	2018 Worlds	9	Giacomo Ferrari; Giulio Calabrò	Giacomo Ferrari; Giulio Calabrò
8	Great Britain	2018 Worlds	11	Luke Patience; Chris Grube	Luke Patience; Chris Grube
9	New Zealand	2018 Worlds	12	Paul Snow-Hansen; Daniel Willcox	Paul Snow-Hansen; Daniel Willcox
10	Greece	2019 Worlds	4	Panagiotis Mantis; Pavlos Kagialis	Panagiotis Mantis; Pavlos Kagialis
11	ROC	2019 Worlds	11	Pavel Sozykin; Denis Gribanov	Pavel Sozykin; Denis Gribanov
12	China	2019 Worlds	12	Xu Zangjun; Wang Chao	Xu Zangjun; Wang Yang
13	Turkey	2019 Worlds	13	Deniz Çınar; Ateş Çınar	Deniz Çınar; Ateş Çınar
14	Angola	2019 African	1	Matias Montinho; Paixão Afonso	Matias Montinho; Paixão Afonso
15	South Korea	2019 Asian	1	Park Gun-woo; Cho Sung-min	Park Gun-woo; Cho Sung-min
16	American Samoa	Sail Melbourne Int'l (Oceania)	1	Tyler Paige; Adrian Hoesch	Tyler Paige; Adrian Hoesch
17	Portugal	2021 Worlds (Europe)	2	Diogo Costa; Pedro Costa	Diogo Costa; Pedro Costa
18	Canada	2020 World Cup (NAM)	23	Jacob Saunders; Oliver Bone	Jacob Saunders; Oliver Bone
19	Brazil	2020 South American	1	Geison Dzioubanov; Gustavo Thiesen	Henrique Haddad; Bruno Bethlem

=== Skiff – 49er ===
#	Nation	Qualification Tournament	Place in Event	Sailor	Sailor at Games
1	Japan	Host Country	—N/a	—N/a	Leonard Takahashi; Ibuki Koizumi
2	Croatia	2018 Worlds	1	Šime Fantela; Mihovil Fantela	Šime Fantela; Mihovil Fantela
3	France	2018 Worlds	2	Mathieu Frei; Noé Delpech	Émile Amoros; Lucas Rual
4	Germany	2018 Worlds	3	Tim Fischer; Fabian Graf	Erik Heil; Thomas Plößel
5	Great Britain	2018 Worlds	5	James Peters; Fynn Sterritt	Dylan Fletcher; Stuart Bithell
6	New Zealand	2018 Worlds	7	Logan Dunning Beck; Oscar Gunn	Peter Burling; Blair Tuke
7	Portugal	2018 Worlds	9	Jorge Lima; José Costa	Jorge Lima; José Costa
8	Switzerland	2018 Worlds	10	Lucien Cujean; Sébastien Schneiter	Lucien Cujean; Sébastien Schneiter
9	Denmark	2018 Worlds	11	Mads Emil Lübeck; Nikolaj Hoffmann Buhl	Jakob Precht Jensen; Jonas Warrer
10	Spain	2019 Worlds	4	Diego Botín; Iago López	Diego Botín; Iago López
11	Austria	2019 Worlds	6	Benjamin Bildstein; David Hussl	Benjamin Bildstein; David Hussl
12	Netherlands	2019 Worlds	8	Bart Lambriex; Pim van Vugt	Bart Lambriex; Pim van Vugt
13	Poland	2019 Worlds	10	Łukasz Przybytek; Paweł Kołodziński	Łukasz Przybytek; Paweł Kołodziński
14	Canada	2019 Pan American (NAM)	3	Alexander Heinzemann; Justin Barnes	William Jones; Evan DePaul
15	Brazil	2019 Pan American (SAM)	1	Marco Grael; Gabriel Borges	Marco Grael; Gabriel Borges
16	Australia	2020 Worlds (Oceania)	5	William Phillips; Sam Phillips	William Phillips; Sam Phillips
17	South Africa	2021 Mussanah Open (Africa)	6	Benjamin Talbot; Alex Burger	Benjamin Talbot; Alex Burger
18	India	2021 Mussanah Open (Asia)	1	K.C. Ganapathy; Varun Thakkar	K.C. Ganapathy; Varun Thakkar
19	Ireland	Lanzarote Int'l Regatta (Europe)	3	Robert Dickson; Sean Waddilove	Robert Dickson; Sean Waddilove

== Women's events ==
=== Windsurfer – RS:X ===
#	Nation	Qualification Tournament	Place in Event	Sailor	Sailor at Games
1	Japan	Host Country	—N/a	—N/a	Yuki Sunaga
2	Netherlands	2018 Worlds	1	Lilian de Geus	Lilian de Geus
3	France	2018 Worlds	2	Charline Picon	Charline Picon
4	China	2018 Worlds	3	Lu Yunxiu	Lu Yunxiu
5	Great Britain	2018 Worlds	4	Emma Wilson	Emma Wilson
6	Poland	2018 Worlds	5	Zofia Noceti-Klepacka	Zofia Noceti-Klepacka
7	Italy	2018 Worlds	7	Marta Maggetti	Marta Maggetti
8	Israel	2018 Worlds	11	Maya Morris	Katy Spychakov
9	Spain	2018 Worlds	12	Blanca Manchón	Blanca Manchón
10	Denmark	2018 Worlds	14	Lærke Buhl-Hansen	Lærke Buhl-Hansen
11	ROC	2018 Worlds	17	Stefania Elfutina	Anna Khvorikova
12	Estonia	2018 Worlds	19	Ingrid Puusta	Ingrid Puusta
13	Hong Kong	2019 Worlds	10	Hayley Chan	Hayley Chan
14	Brazil	2019 Worlds	15	Patricia Freitas	Patricia Freitas
15	Finland	2019 Worlds	26	Tuuli Petäjä-Sirén	Tuuli Petäjä-Sirén
16	Peru	2019 Worlds	27	María Belén Bazo	María Belén Bazo
17	Turkey	2019 Worlds	36	Dilara Uralp	Dilara Uralp
18	Mexico	2019 Worlds	44	Mariana Aguilar	Demita Vega
19	Hungary	2019 Worlds	51	Sára Cholnoky	Sára Cholnoky
20	United States	2019 Worlds	56	Farrah Hall	Farrah Hall
21	Thailand	2019 Worlds	57	Siripon Kaewduang-ngam	Siripon Kaewduang-ngam
22	Cyprus	2019 Worlds	60	Natasa Lappa	Natasa Lappa
23	Algeria	2019 African	1	Amina Berrichi	Amina Berrichi
24	Singapore	2021 Mussanah Open (Asia)	1	Amanda Ng	Amanda Ng
—	New Zealand	2020 Worlds (Oceania)	24	Veerle Ten Have	
25	Greece	2020 European	18	Aikaterini Divari	Aikaterini Divari
26	Canada	2020 World Cup (NAM)	4	Nikola Girke	Nikola Girke
27	Argentina	2020 South American	1	María Celia Tejerina	María Celia Tejerina

=== One-person dinghy – Laser Radial ===
#	Nation	Qualification Tournament	Place in Event	Sailor	Sailor at Games
1	Japan	Host Country	—N/a	—N/a	Manami Doi
2	Belgium	2018 Worlds	1	Emma Plasschaert	Emma Plasschaert
3	Netherlands	2018 Worlds	2	Marit Bouwmeester	Marit Bouwmeester
4	Denmark	2018 Worlds	3	Anne-Marie Rindom	Anne-Marie Rindom
5	Finland	2018 Worlds	4	Monika Mikkola	Tuula Tenkanen
6	United States	2018 Worlds	5	Paige Railey	Paige Railey
7	Canada	2018 Worlds	6	Sarah Douglas	Sarah Douglas
8	Great Britain	2018 Worlds	7	Alison Young	Alison Young
9	Hungary	2018 Worlds	8	Mária Érdi	Mária Érdi
10	Switzerland	2018 Worlds	9	Maud Jayet	Maud Jayet
11	Turkey	2018 Worlds	10	Nazlı Çağla Dönertaş	Ecem Güzel
12	Poland	2018 Worlds	12	Magdalena Kwaśna	Magdalena Kwaśna
13	Greece	2018 Worlds	16	Vasileia Karachaliou	Vasileia Karachaliou
14	Italy	2018 Worlds	17	Carolina Albano	Silvia Zennaro
15	Sweden	2018 Worlds	18	Josefin Olsson	Josefin Olsson
16	France	2018 Worlds	19	Mathilde de Kerangat	Marie Bolou
17	Norway	2018 Worlds	21	Line Flem Høst	Line Flem Høst
18	China	2018 Worlds	25	Zhang Dongshuang	Zhang Dongshuang
19	Germany	2018 Worlds	26	Svenja Weger	Svenja Weger
20	Malaysia	2018 Asian Games	3	Nur Shazrin Mohd Latif	Nur Shazrin Mohd Latif
21	Croatia	2019 Worlds	20	Elena Vorobeva	Elena Vorobeva
22	Lithuania	2019 Worlds	28	Viktorija Andrulytė	Viktorija Andrulytė
23	Belarus	2019 Worlds	40	Tatiana Drozdovskaya	Tatiana Drozdovskaya
24	Australia	2019 Worlds	41	Zoe Thomson	Mara Stransky
25	ROC	2019 Worlds	45	Ekaterina Zyuzina	Ekaterina Zyuzina
26	Ireland	2019 Worlds	46	Aisling Keller	Annalise Murphy
—	New Zealand	2019 Worlds	47	Olivia Christie	
27	Cyprus	2019 Worlds	50	Marilena Makri	Marilena Makri
28	Guatemala	2019 Worlds	51	Isabella Maegli	Isabella Maegli
29	Thailand	2019 Worlds	52	Kamolwan Chanyim	Kamolwan Chanyim
30	Spain	2019 Worlds	53	Cristina Pujol	Cristina Pujol
31	Argentina	2019 Pan American	3	Lucía Falasca	Lucía Falasca
32	Uruguay	2019 Pan American	4	Dolores Moreira	Dolores Moreira
33	Mozambique	2019 African	1	Deisy Nhaquile	Deisy Nhaquile
34	Egypt	2019 African	2	Khouloud Mansy	Khouloud Mansy
35	India	2021 Mussanah Open (Asia)	2	Nethra Kumanan	Nethra Kumanan
36	Hong Kong	2021 Mussanah Open (Asia)	3	Stephanie Norton	Stephanie Norton
37	Fiji	2020 Worlds (Oceania)	97	Sophia Morgan	Sophia Morgan
38	Papua New Guinea	2020 Worlds (Oceania)	102	Rose-Lee Numa	Rose-Lee Numa
39	Israel	Vilamoura Int'l Regatta (Europe)	39	Shay Kakon	Shay Kakon
40	Portugal	Vilamoura Int'l Regatta (Europe)	44	Carolina João	Carolina João
41	Mexico	2020 World Cup (NAM)	8	Elena Oetling	Elena Oetling
42	Peru	2019 Copa Brasil (SAM)	1	Paloma Schmidt	Paloma Schmidt
43	Antigua and Barbuda	Tripartite	—N/a	—N/a	Jalese Gordon
44	Saint Lucia	Tripartite	—N/a	—N/a	Stephanie Devaux-Lovell

=== Two-person dinghy – 470 ===
#	Nation	Qualification Tournament	Place in Event	Sailor	Sailor at Games
1	Japan	Host Country	—N/a	—N/a	Ai Kondo; Miho Yoshioka
2	Spain	2018 Worlds	2	Silvia Mas; Patricia Cantero	Silvia Mas; Patricia Cantero
3	Great Britain	2018 Worlds	3	Hannah Mills; Eilidh McIntyre	Hannah Mills; Eilidh McIntyre
4	France	2018 Worlds	4	Camille Lecointre; Aloïse Retornaz	Camille Lecointre; Aloïse Retornaz
5	China	2018 Worlds	6	Wei Mengxi; Gao Haiyan	Wei Mengxi; Gao Haiyan
6	Italy	2018 Worlds	7	Benedetta di Salle; Alessandra Dubbini	Elena Berta; Bianca Caruso
7	Greece	2018 Worlds	9	Maria Bozi; Rafailina Klonaridou	Ariadne Paraskevi Spanaki; Emilia Tsoulfa
8	Slovenia	2018 Worlds	10	Tina Mrak; Veronika Macarol	Tina Mrak; Veronika Macarol
9	Israel	2018 Worlds	11	Gil Cohen; Noa Lasry	Shahar Tibi; Noya Bar Am
10	Poland	2019 Worlds	7	Agnieszka Skrzypulec; Jolanta Ogar	Agnieszka Skrzypulec; Jolanta Ogar
11	Brazil	2019 Worlds	8	Fernanda Oliveira; Ana Barbachan	Fernanda Oliveira; Ana Barbachan
12	Australia	2019 Worlds	9	Nia Jerwood; Monique de Vries	Nia Jerwood; Monique de Vries
13	Netherlands	2019 Worlds	12	Afrodite Zegers; Lobke Berkhout	Afrodite Zegers; Lobke Berkhout
—	New Zealand	2019 Worlds	15	Susannah Pyatt; Brianna Reynolds-Smith	
14	Germany	2019 Worlds	16	Frederike Löwe; Anna Markfort	Luise Wanser; Anastasiya Winkel
15	Switzerland	2019 Worlds	18	Linda Fahrni; Maja Siegenthaler	Linda Fahrni; Maja Siegenthaler
16	Sweden	2019 Worlds	27	Olivia Bergström; Lovisa Karlsson	Olivia Bergström; Lovisa Karlsson
17	Mozambique	2019 African	6	Denise Parruque; Maria Machava	Denise Parruque; Maria Machava
18	Malaysia	2019 Asian	5	Nuraisyah Jamil; Juni Karimah Noor Jamali	Nuraisyah Jamil; Juni Karimah Noor Jamali
—		Sail Melbourne Int'l (Oceania)			
19	Turkey	2021 Worlds (Europe)	22	Beste Kaynakcı; Okyanus Arıkan	Beste Kaynakcı; Okyanus Arıkan
20	United States	2020 World Cup (NAM)	8	Carmen Cowles; Emma Cowles	Nikki Barnes; Lara Dallman-Weiss
21	Argentina	2020 South American	1	María Belén Tavella; Lourdes Hartkopf	María Belén Tavella; Lourdes Hartkopf

=== Skiff – 49er FX ===
#	Nation	Qualification Tournament	Place in Event	Sailor	Sailor at Games
1	Japan	Host Country	—N/a	—N/a	Anna Yamazaki; Sena Takano
2	Netherlands	2018 Worlds	1	Annemiek Bekkering; Annette Duetz	Annemiek Bekkering; Annette Duetz
3	Austria	2018 Worlds	2	Tanja Frank; Lorena Abicht	Tanja Frank; Lorena Abicht
4	Great Britain	2018 Worlds	3	Sophie Weguelin; Sophie Ainsworth	Charlotte Dobson; Saskia Tidey
5	Brazil	2018 Worlds	4	Martine Grael; Kahena Kunze	Martine Grael; Kahena Kunze
6	Denmark	2018 Worlds	5	Jena Mai Hansen; Katja Salskov-Iversen	Ida Marie Baad Nielsen; Marie Thusgaard Olsen
7	New Zealand	2018 Worlds	8	Alexandra Maloney; Molly Meech	Alexandra Maloney; Molly Meech
8	Norway	2018 Worlds	9	Ragna Agerup; Maia Agerup	Marie Rønningen; Helene Næss
9	Australia	2018 Worlds	11	Natasha Bryant; Annie Wilmot	Tess Lloyd; Jaime Ryan
10	Germany	2019 Worlds	5	Tina Lutz; Susann Beucke	Tina Lutz; Susann Beucke
11	Argentina	2019 Worlds	8	Victoria Travascio; María Sol Branz	Victoria Travascio; María Sol Branz
12	United States	2019 Worlds	9	Paris Henken; Anna Tobias	Stephanie Roble; Maggie Shea
13	Poland	2019 Worlds	12	Aleksandra Melzacka; Kinga Łoboda	Aleksandra Melzacka; Kinga Łoboda
14	Spain	2019 Worlds	14	Patricia Suaréz; Nicole van der Velden	Paula Barceló; Támara Echegoyen
15	Singapore	2019 Worlds	15	Kimberly Lim; Cecilia Low	Kimberly Lim; Cecilia Low
16	France	2019 Worlds	16	Julie Bossard; Aude Compan	Albane Dubois; Lili Sebesi
17	Tunisia	2021 Mussanah Open (Africa)	6	Eya Guezguez; Sarra Guezguez	Eya Guezguez; Sarra Guezguez
18	China	2021 Mussanah Open (Asia)	1	Chen Shasha; Ye Jin	Chen Shasha; Ye Jin
—		2020 Worlds (Oceania)			
19	Belgium	2021 Lanzarote Int'l Regatta (Europe)	7	Anouk Geurts; Isaura Maenhaut	Anouk Geurts; Isaura Maenhaut
20	Canada	2019 Pan American (NAM)	4	Alexandra Ten Hove; Mariah Millen	Alexandra Ten Hove; Mariah Millen
21	Peru	2019 Pan American (SAM)	5	Diana Tudela; María Pia van Oordt	Diana Tudela; María Pia van Oordt

== Mixed events ==
=== Multihull – Nacra 17 ===
#	Nation	Qualification Tournament	Place in Event	Sailor	Sailor at Games
1	Japan	Host Country	—N/a	—N/a	Shibuki Iitsuka; Eri Hatayama
2	Italy	2018 Worlds	1	Ruggero Tita; Caterina Banti	Ruggero Tita; Caterina Banti
3	Australia	2018 Worlds	2	Nathan Outteridge; Haylee Outteridge	Jason Waterhouse; Lisa Darmanin
4	Argentina	2018 Worlds	3	Santiago Lange; Cecilia Carranza	Santiago Lange; Cecilia Carranza
5	Denmark	2018 Worlds	4	Christian Peter Lübeck; Lin Ea Cenholt	Christian Peter Lübeck; Lin Ea Cenholt
6	Brazil	2018 Worlds	5	Samuel Albrecht; Gabriela Nicolino de Sá	Samuel Albrecht; Gabriela Nicolino de Sá
7	Great Britain	2018 Worlds	8	John Gimson; Anna Burnet	John Gimson; Anna Burnet
8	Austria	2018 Worlds	9	Thomas Zajac; Barbara Matz	Thomas Zajac; Barbara Matz
9	New Zealand	2018 Worlds	11	Micah Wilkinson; Olivia MacKay	Micah Wilkinson; Erica Dawson
10	Spain	2019 Worlds	5	Tara Pacheco; Florián Trittel	Tara Pacheco; Florián Trittel
11	France	2019 Worlds	10	Quentin Delapierre; Manon Audinet	Quentin Delapierre; Manon Audinet
12	Germany	2019 Worlds	11	Paul Kohlhoff; Alica Stuhlemmer	Paul Kohlhoff; Alica Stuhlemmer
13	United States	2019 Worlds	14	Riley Gibbs; Anna Weis	Riley Gibbs; Anna Weis
14	Norway	2019 Worlds	21	Nicholas Fadler Martinsen; Martine Steller Mortensen	Nicholas Fadler Martinsen; Martine Steller Mortensen
15	Sweden	2019 Worlds	26	Emil Järudd; Cecilia Jonsson	Emil Järudd; Cecilia Jonsson
16	Tunisia	Lanzarote Int'l Regatta (Africa)	20	Mehdi Gharbi; Rania Rahali	Mehdi Gharbi; Rania Rahali
17	China	2021 Asian	1	Yang Xuezhe; Hu Xiaoxiao	Yang Xuezhe; Hu Xiaoxiao
—		2020 Worlds (Oceania)			
18	Finland	Lanzarote Int'l Regatta (Europe)	5	Janne Järvinen; Sinem Kurtbay	Akseli Keskinen; Sinem Kurtbay
19	Puerto Rico	2019 Pan American (NAM)	6	Enrique Figueroa; Gretchen Ortiz	Enrique Figueroa; Gretchen Ortiz
20	Uruguay	2019 Pan American (SAM)	4	Pablo Defazio; Dominique Knüppel	Pablo Defazio; Dominique Knüppel
