= Sailing at the 2024 Summer Olympics – Laser Radial =

Women's Laser Radial at the Games of the XXXIII Olympiad
- Venues: Marseille, France
- Dates: 1–6 August 2024
- Competitors: 43 from 43 nations

Medalists
1st place, gold medalist(s)		Marit Bouwmeester	Netherlands
2nd place, silver medalist(s)		Anne-Marie Rindom	Denmark
3rd place, bronze medalist(s)		Line Flem Høst	Norway

The women's Laser Radial was a sailing event which was the women's one-person dinghy event, being held in Marseille, France, from 1 to 6 August 2024. 43 sailors from 43 nations competed in 11 races, including one medal-race with the top 10 ranked contestant for double points were. Due to low winds, race 10 was cancelled.

After the final regular race, Dutch contestant Marit Bouwmeester held a 21 point lead. With a maximum of 18 points difference to be scored during the medal race this ensured her of her 2nd gold medal in the Laser Radial after 2016 and her fourth consecutive medal in Olympic Laster Radial contests. Similarly Danish contestant Anne-Marie Rindom held a 20 point lead over third place ensuring a silver medal and her 3rd consecutive medal in Olympic Laser Radial.

== Schedule ==
Thu 1 Aug	Fri 2 Aug	Sat 3 Aug	Sun 4 Aug	Mon 5 Aug	Tue 6 Aug	Wed 7 Aug
Race 1	Race 2 Race 3	Race 4 Race 5 Race 6	Race 7 Race 8	Race 9; ~~Race 10~~	~~Medal race~~ Postponed	Medal race

== Results ==
Official results (through race 9)

Results of individual races
Pos	Helmsman	Country	I	II	III	IV	V	VI	VII	VIII	IX	MR	Tot	Pts
1st place, gold medalist(s)	Marit Bouwmeester	Netherlands	4	1	2	4	2	3	3	11	20^{†}	8	58	38
2nd place, silver medalist(s)	Anne-Marie Rindom	Denmark	7	26^{†}	7	2	8	4	15	4	4	10	87	61
3rd place, bronze medalist(s)	Line Flem Høst	Norway	11	3	19^{†}	19	7	2	12	14	3	4	94	75
4	Maud Jayet	Switzerland	16	4	3	8	13	17	7	8	23^{†}	14	113	90
5	Chiara Benini Floriani	Italy	3	7	25	10	18	10	11	5	38^{†}	2	129	91
6	Elena Vorobeva	Croatia	5	18	40^{†}	16	3	12	4	13	8	18	137	97
7	Emma Plasschaert	Belgium	25^{†}	10	11	6	9	16	8	7	16	16	124	99
8	Sarah Douglas	Canada	23^{†}	13	13	12	17	8	13	9	14	6	128	105
9	Erika Reineke	United States	13	25	18	3	4	7	44^{†} BFD	2	26	12	154	110
10	Louise Cervera	France	1	24^{†}	4	18	5	22	18	3	22	20	137	113
11	Lucía Falasca	Argentina	35^{†}	11	14	33	11	5	10	16	2	-	137	102
12	Hannah Snellgrove	Great Britain	17	20	6	1	1	14	20	29	32^{†}	-	140	108
13	Eve McMahon	Ireland	8	21	16	22	34^{†}	13	6	15	7	-	142	108
14	Mária Érdi	Hungary	20	19	33^{†}	14	25	24	14	1	1	-	151	118
15	Agata Barwinska	Poland	34^{†}	12	30	20	6	19	2	20	11	-	154	120
16	Monika Mikkola	Finland	18	2	5	13	30	29	44^{†} BFD	18	12	-	171	127
17	Josefin Olsson	Sweden	36^{†}	23	28	9	12	1	5	19	31	-	164	128
18	Ecem Güzel	Turkey	9	22	24	21	22	9	1	32^{†}	21	-	161	129
19	Gu Min	China	2	8	8	37^{†}	19	31	28	25	13	-	171	134
20	Zoe Thomson	Australia	12	37^{†}	22	11	16	6	19	35	15	-	173	136
21	Nethra Kumanan	India	6	15	27	28	28	20	21	31^{†}	10	-	186	155
22	Dolores Moreira	Uruguay	24	27	9	25	10	28^{†}	9	28	25	-	185	157
23	Ebru Bolat	Romania	28	16	32^{†}	5	14	21	24	26	24	-	190	158
24	Shay Kakon	Israel	22	33	12	7	31	34^{†}	25	10	18	-	192	158
25	Julia Buessellberg	Germany	10	14	10	27	24	27	23	33^{†}	27	-	195	162
26	Elena Oetling	Mexico	27	31^{†}	17	30	27	25	16	24	5	-	202	171
27	Sophia Montgomery	Thailand	26	29	35	23	21	15	44^{†} BFD	6	34	-	233	189
28	Lin Pletikos	Slovenia	31	9	38^{†}	17	37	35	22	22	17	-	228	190
29	Ana Moncada	Spain	30	39	1	24	29	36	44^{†} BFD	23	9	-	235	191
30	Marilena Makri	Cyprus	32^{†}	17	29	31	26	26	30	17	19	-	227	195
31	Viktorija Andrulytė	Lithuania	40.2^{†} DPI	5	36	26	32	33	31	27	6	-	236.2	196
32	Florencia Chiarella	Peru	29	30	21	32	35	11	26	12	39^{†}	-	235	196
33	Gabriella Kidd	Brazil	15	6	15	34	23	30	44^{†} BFD	34	41	-	242	198
34	Greta Pilkington	New Zealand	21	34	41^{†}	15	33	18	17	21	40	-	240	199
35	Nur Shazrin Mohamad Latif	Malaysia	19	38^{†}	23	29	20	32	29	30	33	-	253	215
36	Adriana Penruddocke	Bermuda	14	35	26	35	15	23	44^{†} BFD	36	42	-	270	226
37	Sophia Morgan	Fiji	33	28	20	38	40^{†}	38	33	38	29	-	297	257
38	María José Poncell	Chile	37	42^{†}	37	36	39	37	27	37	28	-	320	278
39	Khouloud Mansy	Egypt	40	36	31	39	41^{†}	41	35	40	36	-	339	298
40	Deizy Nhaquile	Mozambique	39	32	34	42^{†}	42	42	36	41	35	-	343	301
41	Charlotte Webster	Cayman Islands	41	40	39	41	36	40	32	43^{†}	37	-	349	306
42	Ameena Shah	Kuwait	43^{†}	43	42	43	43	43	34	42	30	-	363	320
43	Vaimooia Ripley	Samoa	42	41	43	40	38	39	44^{†} BFD	39	43	-	369	325

Scoring system: low-point system;
Legend: – Qualified for medal race(s); BFD – Black flag disqualification; DNF – Did not finish; DPI – Discretionary penalty imposed; OCS – On the course side of the starting line; RDG – Redress given; RET – Retired; UFD – "U" flag disqualification; † – Discarded race not counted in the overall result;
