= Sailing at the 2020 Summer Olympics – Women's 470 =

Sporting event

Women's 470 at the Games of the XXXII Olympiad
- Line drawing of the 470
- Venue: Enoshima Yacht Harbor
- Dates: 28 July – 2 August 2021

Medalists
1st place, gold medalist(s)		Hannah Mills; Eilidh McIntyre	Great Britain
2nd place, silver medalist(s)		Agnieszka Skrzypulec; Jolanta Ogar	Poland
3rd place, bronze medalist(s)		Camille Lecointre; Aloïse Retornaz	France

The women's 470 was a sailing event at the 2020 Summer Olympics, in the 470 dinghy that took place between 28 July and 2 August 2021 at Enoshima Yacht Harbor. 11 races (the last one a medal race) were held. 21 teams qualified for the event.

Medals were presented by Camilo Pérez López Moreira, IOC Member, Paraguay; and the medalists' bouquets presented by Mr. Tomasz Chamera, World Sailing Vice-President, Poland.

== Schedule ==
Wed 28 Jul	Thu 29 Jul	Fri 30 Jul	Sat 31 Jul	Sun 1 Aug	Mon 2 Aug	Tue 3 Aug	Wed 4 Aug
Race 1 Race 2	Race 3 Race 4	Race 5 Race 6	Rest day	Race 7 Race 8	Race 9 Race 10	Rest day	Medal race

== Results ==
Results of individual races
Pos	Crew	Country	I	II	III	IV	V	VI	VII	VIII	IX	X	MR	Tot	Pts
1st place, gold medalist(s)	Hannah Mills; Eilidh McIntyre	Great Britain	4	3	7	1	3	3	1	3	9^{†}	3	10	47	38
2nd place, silver medalist(s)	Agnieszka Skrzypulec; Jolanta Ogar	Poland	1	1	2	5	12	1	5	4	15^{†}	15	8	69	54
3rd place, bronze medalist(s)	Camille Lecointre; Aloïse Retornaz	France	3	2	4	7	1	12^{†}	6	5	10	4	12	66	54
4	Linda Fahrni; Maja Siegenthaler	Switzerland	12^{†}	4	8	2	5	10	9	7	12	5	2	76	64
5	Tina Mrak; Veronika Macarol	Slovenia	8	16^{†}	6	9	4	7	3	9	2	7	14	85	69
6	Luise Wanser; Anastasiya Winkel	Germany	22^{†} DSQ	22; DSQ	5	4	15	8	7	1	5	6	4	99	77
7	Ai Kondo; Miho Yoshioka	Japan	6	7	11	15^{†}	2	2	12	8	7	8	16	94	79
8	Noya Bar Am; Shahar Tibi	Israel	2	14	22	3	10	11	4	11	6	3	6	102	80
9	Fernanda Oliveira; Ana Barbachan	Brazil	15^{†}	5	1	10	13	4	10	10	8	1	20	97	82
10	Afrodite Zegers; Lobke Berkhout	Netherlands	10	11	14	11	9	6	17^{†}	6	4	2	18	108	91
11	Silvia Mas; Patricia Cantero	Spain	11	13	3	6	14	15	8	17^{†}	1	10		98	81
12	Nikki Barnes; Lara Dallman-Weiss	United States	13	6	15	13	6	5	19	2	22^{†} UFD	19		120	98
13	Elena Berta; Bianca Caruso	Italy	5	10	9	12	8	16^{†}	14	16	16	12		118	102
14	Olivia Bergström; Lovisa Karlsson	Sweden	17	9	10	16	7	9	18^{†}	14	11	18		129	111
15	Ariadne Paraskevi Spanaki; Emilia Tsoulfa	Greece	14	8	22^{†} BFD	17	17	13	2	12	22; UFD	9		136	114
16	Nia Jerwood; Monique de Vries	Australia	7	12	12	8	18	19	15	13	13	20^{†}		137	117
17	Beste Kaynakçı; Okyanus Arıkan	Turkey	18	18.1; DPI	22^{†} BFD	18	11	14	13	18	3	14		149.1	127.1
18	Wei Mengxi; Gao Haiyan	China	9	15	16	14	22^{†} DSQ	18	11	15	14	17		151	129
19	Nuraisyah Jamil; Juni Karimah Noor Jamali	Malaysia	16	18	17	20	19	20	20	22^{†} DNF	17	11		180	158
20	María Belén Tavella; Lourdes Hartkopf	Argentina	22^{†} DSQ	22; DSQ	13	19	16	17	16	19	22; UFD	16		182	160
21	Denise Parruque; Maria Machava	Mozambique	22^{†} DNC	22; DNC	18	21	20	21	21	20	18	21		204	182

Scoring system: low-point system;
Legend: – Qualified for medal race(s); BFD – Black flag disqualification; DNC – Did not come to the starting area; DNE – Non excludable disqualification; DNF – Did not finish; DPI – Discretionary penalty imposed; DSQ – Disqualified; UFD – "U" flag disqualification; † – Discarded race not counted in the overall result;
