= Sailing at the 2020 Summer Olympics – Nacra 17 =

Mixed Nacra 17 at the Games of the XXXII Olympiad
- Venues: Kamakura, Japan; Enoshima, Japan; Fujisawa, Japan
- Dates: 25 July – 1 August 2021
- Competitors: 20 from 20 nations

Medalists
1st place, gold medalist(s)		Ruggero Tita; Caterina Banti	Italy
2nd place, silver medalist(s)		John Gimson; Anna Burnet	Great Britain
3rd place, bronze medalist(s)		Paul Kohlhoff; Alica Stuhlemmer	Germany

The mixed Nacra 17 was a sailing event at the 2020 Summer Olympics that took place between 28 July–3 August at Kamakura. 13 races (the last one a medal race) were held.

The medals were presented by IOC Member Giovanni Malagò and World Sailing Athlete Commission Chair Jo Aleh (NZL).

== Schedule ==
Wed 28 Jul	Thu 29 Jul	Fri 30 Jul	Sat 31 Jul	Sun 1 Aug	Mon 2 Aug	Tue 3 Aug
Race 1 Race 2 Race 3	Race 4 Race 5 Race 6	Rest day	Race 7 Race 8 Race 9	Race 10; Race 11; Race 12	Rest day	Medal race

== Results ==
Results of individual races
Pos	Crew	Country	I	II	III	IV	V	VI	VII	VIII	IX	X	XI	XII	MR	Tot	Pts
Gold medal	Ruggero Tita; Caterina Banti	Italy	1	3	1	2	5	1	8^{†}	3	2	2	1	2	12	43	35
Silver medal	John Gimson; Anna Burnet	Great Britain	7	5	2	1	1	2	5	10^{†}	1	5	2	4	10	55	45
Bronze medal	Paul Kohlhoff; Alica Stuhlemmer	Germany	5	1	7	3	3	11^{†}	3	2	8	3	6	6	16	74	63
4	Lin Cenholt; Christian Lubeck	Denmark	8	8	10	7	2	4	13^{†}	11	11	1	3	1	4	83	70
5	Jason Waterhouse; Lisa Darmanin	Australia	2	11^{†}	4	4	7	8	1	5	4	6	5	8	18	83	72
6	Tara Pacheco; Florián Trittel	Spain	4	6	6	10	6	3	7	1	7	9	13^{†}	3	14	89	76
7	Santiago Lange; Cecilia Carranza	Argentina	6	2	5	8	4	6	6	14^{†}	10	8	11	9	2	91	77
8	Quentin Delapierre; Manon Audinet	France	18^{†}	4	3	5	9	7	10	4	13	7	7	7	8	102	84
9	Riley Gibbs; Anna Weis	United States	9	7	12	6	11	13^{†}	9	12	5	13	4	5	6	112	99
10	Samuel Albrecht; Gabriela Nicolino	Brazil	10	14	9	9	10	10	2	7	6	18^{†}	10	10	20	135	117
11	Thomas Zajac; Barbara Matz	Austria	3	10	8	14^{†}	13	5	12	13	9	4	12	11		114	100
12	Micah Wilkinson; Erica Dawson	New Zealand	11	12	13	11	8	12	15	9	18^{†}	17	8	14		148	130
13	Sinem Kurtbay; Akseli Keskinen	Finland	16	9	19^{†}	13	14	9	18	8	12	11	9	12		150	131
14	Emil Järudd; Cecilia Jonsson	Sweden	17	13	11	16	12	14	19^{†}	16	3	10	16	16		163	144
15	Shibuki Iitsuka; Eri Hatayama	Japan	12	18	15	12	15	16	14	6	14	19^{†}	15	13		169	150
16	Xuezhe Yang; Xiaoxiao Hu	China	13	19	14	15	16	15	16	20^{†}	16	14	14	15		187	167
17	Enrique Figueroa; Gretchen Ortiz	Puerto Rico	15	16	16	18	18	19^{†}	4	17	19	15	18	18		193	174
18	Pablo Defazio; Dominique Knüppel	Uruguay	DSQ 21^{†}	15	17	17	17	17	11	18	15	16	17	19		200	179
19	Nicholas Fadler Martinsen; Martine Steller Mortensen	Norway	14	17	18	19^{†}	19	18	17	15	17	12	19	17		202	183
20	Mehdi Gharbi; Rania Rahali	Tunisia	19	20	20	20	20	DSQ 21^{†}	20	19	20	DNF 21	20	20		240	219

Scoring system: low-point system;
Legend: – Qualified for medal race(s); DNF – Did not finish; DSQ – Disqualified; STP – Standard penalty imposed; UFD – "U" flag disqualification; † – Discarded race not counted in the overall result;
