= Sailing at the 2020 Summer Olympics – Finn =

Men's Finn at the Games of the XXXII Olympiad
- Line drawing of the Finn
- Venue: Enoshima, Japan; Sagami Bay, Japan
- Dates: 27 July – 3 August 2021
- Competitors: 19 from 19 nations

Medalists
1st place, gold medalist(s)		Giles Scott	Great Britain
2nd place, silver medalist(s)		Zsombor Berecz	Hungary
3rd place, bronze medalist(s)		Joan Cardona	Spain

The Finn competition at the 2020 Summer Olympics was the men's one-person heavyweight dinghy event and was held in Enoshima, Japan, from 27 July to 3 August 2021. 19 sailors from 19 nations competed in 11 races, including one medal-race where points were doubled. The land venue was Enoshima Yacht Harbour and races were held on Sagami Bay.

== Summary ==
Alican Kaynar of Turkey was the overnight leader after the first day after two bullets, followed by Zsombor Berecz of Hungary with two second-place finishes in the first two races. Kaynar continued his lead after the second day, where Giles Scott had won the two races of the day.

For the medal race, six sailors were in contention for the medals, with Scott in the front. Giles Scott won the Olympic gold medal, and Great Britain's sixth in a row in the event, which was also the last Finn class gold in the Olympics as the event left the Olympic programme. Berecz, finishing ahead of Scott in the medal race but not enough points ahead to pass him, won the silver medal and Juan Cardona won the bronze medal.

The medals were presented by IOC vice-president from Singapore, Mr Ser Miang Ng (a former World Sailing vice-president) and current World Sailing vice-president Thomasz Chamera of Poland.

== Schedule ==
Tue 27 Jul	Wed 28 Jul	Thu 29 Jul	Fri 30 Jul	Sat 31 Jul	Sun 1 Aug	Mon 2 Aug	Tue 3 Aug
Race 1 Race 2	Race 3 Race 4	Race 5 Race 6	Rest day	Race 7 Race 8	Race 9 Race 10	Rest day	Medal race

== Results ==
Results of individual races
Pos	Helmsman	Country	I	II	III	IV	V	VI	VII	VIII	IX	X	MR	Tot	Pts
Gold medal	Giles Scott	Great Britain	9^{†}	9	1	1	1	1	6	1	1	7	8	45	36
Silver medal	Zsombor Berecz	Hungary	2	2	9^{†}	4	6	7	3	5	4	4	2	48	39
Bronze medal	Joan Cardona	Spain	3	3	5	3	2	3	13^{†}	7	5	8	12	64	51
4	Nicholas Heiner	Netherlands	11^{†}	5	10	2	4	2	10	3	7	9	4	67	56
5	Josh Junior	New Zealand	12^{†}	10	3	7	8	5	1	4	8	1	20	79	67
6	Facundo Olezza	Argentina	5	4	8	5	3	6	16^{†}	15	3	3	16	84	68
7	Jake Lilley	Australia	10	8	4	11	7	9	15^{†}	6	2	6	6	84	69
8	Alican Kaynar	Turkey	1	1	6	13	9	14	7	RET 20^{†}	10	10	10	101	81
9	Max Salminen	Sweden	8	12^{†}	7	8	12	8	4	2	11	12	18	102	90
10	Tom Ramshaw	Canada	13	7	11	14^{†}	10	13	2	9	13	2	14	108	94
11	Anders Pedersen	Norway	14^{†}	6	2	10	13	12	5	11	9	14		96	82
12	Ioannis Mitakis	Greece	4	13	13	6	11	10	11	8	16	18^{†}		110	92
13	Luke Muller	United States	6	11	12	15	14	4	8	10	12	17^{†}		109	92
14	Jorge Zarif	Brazil	7	15	15	9	5	11	14	13	6	16^{†}		111	95
15	Chen He	China	16	14	14	17^{†}	16	15	9	14	15	11		141	124
16	Kazumasa Segawa	Japan	18	16	17	12	15	16	19^{†}	12	17	5		147	128
17	Juan Pérez	Mexico	19^{†}	17	16	16	17	17	17	16	14	15		164	145
18	Andrés Lage	Venezuela	15	18	18	18	19^{†}	18	18	17	19	13		173	154
19	Leo Davis	South Africa	17	19^{†}	19	19	18	19	12	18	18	19		178	159

Legend: – Qualified for medal race(s); RET – Retired; † – Discarded race not counted in the overall result;
