= Sailing at the 2020 Summer Olympics – Laser =

Men's Laser at the Games of the XXXII Olympiad
- Venues: Enoshima, Japan; Sagami Bay, Japan
- Dates: 25 July – 1 August 2021
- Competitors: 35 from 35 nations

Medalists
| 1st place, gold medalist(s) | | Matthew Wearn | Australia |
| 2nd place, silver medalist(s) | | Tonči Stipanović | Croatia |
| 3rd place, bronze medalist(s) | | Hermann Tomasgaard | Norway |

The Laser competition at the 2020 Summer Olympics was the men's one-person dinghy event and was held in Enoshima, Japan, from 25 July to 1 August 2021. 35 sailors from 35 nations competed in 11 races, including one medal-race where points were doubled. The land venue was Enoshima Yacht Harbour and races were held on Sagami Bay.

Medals were presented by IOC Member for Cuba Mrs María Caridad Colón and World Sailing chief executive officer David Graham.

== Schedule ==
| Sun 25 Jul | Mon 26 Jul | Tue 27 Jul | Wed 28 Jul | Thu 29 Jul | Fri 30 Jul | Sat 31 Jul | Sun 1 Aug |
|---|---|---|---|---|---|---|---|
| Race 1 | Race 2 Race 3 | Race 4 Race 5 Race 6 | Rest day | Race 7 Race 8 | Race 9 Race 10 | Rest day | Medal race |

== Results ==
Results of individual races
| Pos | Helmsman | Country | I | II | III | IV | V | VI | VII | VIII | IX | X | MR | Tot | Pts |
|---|---|---|---|---|---|---|---|---|---|---|---|---|---|---|---|
| Gold medal | Matthew Wearn | Australia | 17 | 28^{†} | 2 | 4 | 2 | 2 | 1 | 1 | 12 | 8 | 4 | 81 | 53 |
| Silver medal | Tonči Stipanović | Croatia | 15 | 6 | 3 | 22^{†} | 13 | 4 | 5 | 11 | 7 | 10 | 8 | 104 | 82 |
| Bronze medal | Hermann Tomasgaard | Norway | 3 | 18 | 15 | 2 | 6 | 8 | 10 | 5 | 19^{†} | 4 | 14 | 104 | 85 |
| 4 | Pavlos Kontides | Cyprus | 4 | 7 | 5 | 1 | 20 | 1 | 36^{†} (RET) | 6 | 8 | 24 | 12 | 124 | 88 |
| 5 | Philipp Buhl | Germany | 10 | 2 | 10 | 21 | 12 | 22 | 4 | 3 | 32^{†} | 1 | 6 | 123 | 91 |
| 6 | Jean-Baptiste Bernaz | France | 1 | 9 | 13 | 9 | 23^{†} | 7 | 16 | 4 | 9 | 22 | 2 | 115 | 92 |
| 7 | Ha Jee-min | South Korea | 20 | 8 | 26^{†} | 7 | 7 | 10 | 6 | 14 | 10 | 6 | 10 | 124 | 98 |
| 8 | Robert Scheidt | Brazil | 11 | 10 | 4 | 3 | 17 | 5 | 8 | 12 | 24^{†} | 16 | 18 | 128 | 104 |
| 9 | Kaarle Tapper | Finland | 2 | 3 | 14 | 11 | 8 | 29 | 36^{†} (RET) | 8 | 6 | 12 | 16 | 145 | 109 |
| 10 | Sam Meech | New Zealand | 19^{†} | 19 | 8 | 16 | 14 | 3 | 2 | 13 | 11 | 3 | 20 | 128 | 109 |
| 11 | Sergey Komissarov | ROC | 24 | 16 | 7 | 6 | 15 | 6 | 13 | 7 | 4 | 29^{†} | | 127 | 98 |
| 12 | Elliot Hanson | Great Britain | 5 | 12 | 17 | 10 | 3 | 28 | 7 | 20 | 2 | 36^{†} (RET) | | 140 | 104 |
| 13 | Charlie Buckingham | United States | 9 | 22 | 18 | 5 | 26^{†} | 9 | 3 | 2 | 16 | 23 | | 133 | 107 |
| 14 | Jesper Stålheim | Sweden | 22 | 11 | 1 | 20 | 4 | 17 | 11 | 9 | 29^{†} | 13 | | 137 | 108 |
| 15 | Karl-Martin Rammo | Estonia | 16 | 13 | 19 | 8 | 1 | 21 | 12 | 25 | 1 | 26^{†} | | 142 | 116 |
| 16 | Joel Rodríguez | Spain | 21 | 4 | 23 | 13 | 9 | 25 | 9 | 10 | 27^{†} | 21 | | 162 | 135 |
| 17 | Milivoj Dukić | Montenegro | 29^{†} | 1 | 12 | 26 | 5 | 11 | 15 | 27 | 26 | 14 | | 166 | 137 |
| 18 | Benjámin Vadnai | Hungary | 7 | 21^{†} | 9 | 15 | 16 | 18 | 17 | 21 | 21 | 25 | | 170 | 145 |
| 19 | Juan Ignacio Maegli | Guatemala | 6 | 24 | 25^{†} | 24 | 10 | 23 | 18 | 19 | 20 | 5 | | 174 | 149 |
| 20 | Vishnu Saravanan | India | 14 | 20 | 24 | 23 | 22 | 12 | 27^{†} | 23 | 3 | 15 | | 183 | 156 |
| 21 | Ryan Lo | Singapore | 18 | 15 | 6 | 28 | 21 | 24 | 22 | 36^{†} (UFD) | 22 | 2 | | 194 | 158 |
| 22 | Clemente Seguel | Chile | 25 | 5 | 16 | 27 | 11 | 20 | 21 | 22 | 18 | 31^{†} | | 196 | 165 |
| 23 | Enrique Arathoon | El Salvador | 28^{†} | 17 | 11 | 25 | 27 | 19 | 25 | 17 | 15 | 9 | | 193 | 165 |
| 24 | Francisco Guaragna | Argentina | 13 | 32 | 22 | 12 | 24 | 26 | 36^{†} (BFD) | 16 | 17 | 11 | | 209 | 173 |
| 25 | Stefano Peschiera | Peru | 12 | 26 | 21 | 18 | 19 | 33 | 19 | 15 | 14 | 36^{†} (RET) | | 213 | 177 |
| 26 | Žan Luka Zelko | Slovenia | 8 | 23 | 29 | 17 | 31 | 36^{†} | 20 | 26 | 5 | 19 | | 214 | 178 |
| 27 | Wannes Van Laer | Belgium | 33^{†} | 25 | 20 | 14 | 28 | 31 | 14 | 18 | 13 | 17 | | 213 | 180 |
| 28 | Khairulnizam Afendy | Malaysia | 26 | 14 | 28 | 29^{†} | 18 | 13 | 26 | 28 | 23 | 20 | | 225 | 196 |
| 29 | Andrew Lewis | Trinidad and Tobago | 23 | 29 | 27 | 31^{†} | 30 | 15 | 23 | 24 | 25 | 7 | | 234 | 203 |
| 30 | Kenji Nanri | Japan | 27 | 30 | 34^{†} | 19 | 25 | 16 | 24 | 29 | 31 | 18 | | 252 | 219 |
| 31 | Luc Chevrier | Saint Lucia | 30 | 34^{†} | 32 | 33 | 34 | 14 | 28 | 30 | 30 | 30 | | 295 | 261 |
| 32 | Eroni Leilua | Samoa | 31 | 27 | 30 | 32 | 32 | 27 | 30 | 31 | 35^{†} | 28 | | 303 | 268 |
| 33 | Rodney Govinden | Seychelles | 34^{†} | 31 | 34 | 30 | 29 | 32 | 29 | 32 | 28 | 33 | | 312 | 278 |
| 34 | Aly Badawy | Egypt | 32 | 33 | 31 | 34^{†} | 33 | 30 | 31 | 33 | 33 | 27 | | 317 | 283 |
| 35 | Teariki Numa | Papua New Guinea | 35^{†} | 35 | 35 | 35 | 35 | 34 | 32 | 34 | 34 | 32 | | 341 | 306 |

Scoring system: low-point system;
Legend: – Qualified for medal race(s); BFD – Black flag disqualification; DNF – Did not finish; DPI – Discretionary penalty imposed; OCS – On the course side of the starting line; RDG – Redress given; RET – Retired; UFD – "U" flag disqualification; † – Discarded race not counted in the overall result;
