= Rowing at the 2013 Summer Universiade – Men's coxless four =

The men's coxless four competition at the 2013 Summer Universiade in Kazan took place the Kazan Rowing Centre.

== Results ==
=== Heats ===
==== Heat 1 ====
Rank	Rower	Country	Time	Notes
1	Jann-Edzard Junkmann; Milan Dzambasevic; Kay Rückbrodt; Alexander-Nicolas Egler	Germany	6:24.81	Q
2	Simone Ferrarese; Simone Martini; Mattia Boschelli; Elia Salani	Italy	6:43.82	R
3	Cameron Hoey; William Cahill; Leo Davis; Servaas Crowther	South Africa	6:46.02	R
4	Denis Zasimenko; Oleksandr Poddubnyy; Dmytro Zheleznyy; Oleksandr Byelogurov	Ukraine	6:48.20	R

==== Heat 2 ====
Rank	Rower	Country	Time	Notes
1	Andrey Stolyarov; Vasily Stepanov; Mikhail Belov; Denis Nikiforov	Russia	6:36.80	Q
2	Dovydas Balsys; Rokas Balsys; Zygimantas Galisanskis; Marius Ralickas	Lithuania	6:51.79	R
3	Guo Jun; Jiang Xianyong; Hu Jijie; Kong Jianhao	China	8:14.30	R

=== Repechage ===
Rank	Rower	Country	Time	Notes
1	Simone Ferrarese; Simone Martini; Mattia Boschelli; Elia Salani	Italy	7:05.59	Q
2	Dovydas Balsys; Rokas Balsys; Zygimantas Galisanskis; Marius Ralickas	Lithuania	7:09.72	Q
3	Cameron Hoey; William Cahill; Leo Davis; Servaas Crowther	South Africa	7:12.29	Q
4	Denis Zasimenko; Oleksandr Poddubnyy; Dmytro Zheleznyy; Oleksandr Byelogurov	Ukraine	7:14.02	Q
5	Guo Jun; Jiang Xianyong; Hu Jijie; Kong Jianhao	China	9:38.94	

=== Finals ===
==== Final A ====
Rank	Rower	Country	Time	Notes
	Denis Zasimenko; Oleksandr Poddubnyy; Dmytro Zheleznyy; Oleksandr Byelogurov	Ukraine		
	Dovydas Balsys; Rokas Balsys; Zygimantas Galisanskis; Marius Ralickas	Lithuania		
	Jann-Edzard Junkmann; Milan Dzambasevic; Kay Rückbrodt; Alexander-Nicolas Egler	Germany		
	Andrey Stolyarov; Vasily Stepanov; Mikhail Belov; Denis Nikiforov	Russia		
	Simone Ferrarese; Simone Martini; Mattia Boschelli; Elia Salani	Italy		
	Cameron Hoey; William Cahill; Leo Davis; Servaas Crowther	South Africa		
