= Tom Squires =

British windsurfer

Personal information
- Nationality: British
- Born: 3 August 1993 (age 33) Oxford, England
- Height: 193 cm (6 ft 4 in)
- Website: tomsquireswindsurf.com

Sport
- Sport: Sailing
- Club: Oxford Sailing Club
- Coached by: Nick Dempsey

Tom Squires (born 3 August 1993) is a British competitive sailor.

He qualified to represent Great Britain at the 2020 Summer Olympics in Tokyo 2021, competing in men's RS:X.

== Early life ==
Tom Squires was born on 3 August 1993 in Oxford, Oxfordshire. At an early age, he was interested in gardening, which led him to pursue a degree in horticulture.

At the age of 11, his interest in windsurfing began when his father bought an old windsurfer on a family holiday in Pentewan Sands Holiday Park, Cornwall. He enjoyed it so much that they immediately signed him up for the nearest RYA Windsurfing course after they returned home to Oxford.

== Career ==
Tom Squires made his Olympic debut during the Tokyo 2020 Summer Olympics when he competed in the men's RS:X for Team GB, making him the second British male to ever compete in the RS:X class of windsurfing at an Olympic Games, after Nick Dempsey who competed at the 2008, 2012 and 2016 Games. He finished in 7th place.

In 2016, he claimed the prestigious Princess Sofia Trophy.
