= Uruguay at the 2020 Summer Olympics =

- IOC code: URU
- NOC: Uruguayan Olympic Committee
- Website: www.cou.org.uy (in Spanish)

in Tokyo, Japan July 23, 2021 – August 8, 2021
- Competitors: 11 in 5 sports
- Flag bearers (opening): Déborah Rodríguez; Bruno Cetraro
- Flag bearer (closing): María Pía Fernández
- Medals: Gold 0 Silver 0 Bronze 0 Total 0

Summer Olympics appearances (overview)
- 1924; 1928; 1932; 1936; 1948; 1952; 1956; 1960; 1964; 1968; 1972; 1976; 1980; 1984; 1988; 1992; 1996; 2000; 2004; 2008; 2012; 2016; 2020; 2024

Uruguay competed at the 2020 Summer Olympics in Tokyo. Originally scheduled to take place from 24 July to 9 August 2020, the Games were postponed to 23 July to 8 August 2021, due to the COVID-19 pandemic. Since the nation's official debut in 1920, Uruguayan athletes have appeared in every edition of the Summer Olympic Games, with the exception of the 1980 Summer Olympics in Moscow, because of its Uruguay's support to the United States-led boycott. Uruguay left the Olympics with no medals earned.

== Competitors ==
Sport	Men	Women	Total
Athletics	1	2	3
Judo	1	0	1
Rowing	2	0	2
Sailing	1	2	3
Swimming	1	1	2
Total	6	5	11

== Athletics ==
Uruguayan athletes further achieved the entry standards, by world ranking, in the following track and field events (up to a maximum of 3 athletes in each event, one man was qualified by Universality place):

Key

- Note–Ranks given for track events are within the athlete's heat only
- Q = Qualified for the next round
- q = Qualified for the next round as a fastest loser or, in field events, by position without achieving the qualifying target
- NR = National record
- N/A = Round not applicable for the event
- Bye = Athlete not required to compete in round

Track & road events

Athlete	Event	Heat		Semifinal		Final	
Athlete	Event	Result	Rank	Result	Rank	Result	Rank
Déborah Rodríguez	Women's 800 m	2:00.90	2 Q	2:01.76	7	Did not advance	
María Pía Fernández	Women's 1500 m	4:59.56	15	Did not advance			

Field events

Athlete	Event	Qualification		Final	
Athlete	Event	Distance	Position	Distance	Position
Emiliano Lasa	Men's long jump	7.95	13	Did not advance	

== Judo ==
Uruguay qualified one judoka for the men's half-middleweight category (81 kg) at the Games. Alain Aprahamian accepted a continental berth from the Americas as the nation's top-ranked judoka outside of direct qualifying position in the IJF World Ranking List of June 28, 2021.

Athlete	Event	Round of 64	Round of 32	Round of 16	Quarterfinals	Semifinals	Repechage	Final / BM	
Athlete	Event	Opposition Result	Opposition Result	Opposition Result	Opposition Result	Opposition Result	Opposition Result	Opposition Result	Rank
Alain Aprahamian	Men's −81 kg	Bye	Pacek (SWE); L 00–10	Did not advance					

== Rowing ==
Uruguay qualified one boat in the men's lightweight double sculls for the Games by winning the gold medal and securing the first of three berths available at the 2021 FISA Americas Olympic Qualification Regatta in Rio de Janeiro, Brazil.

Athlete	Event	Heats		Repechage		Semifinals		Final	
Athlete	Event	Time	Rank	Time	Rank	Time	Rank	Time	Rank
Bruno Cetraro; Felipe Klüver	Men's lightweight double sculls	6:42.85	6 R	6:36.87	3 SA/B	6:11.48	2 FA	6:24.21	6

Qualification Legend: FA=Final A (medal); FB=Final B (non-medal); FC=Final C (non-medal); FD=Final D (non-medal); FE=Final E (non-medal); FF=Final F (non-medal); SA/B=Semifinals A/B; SC/D=Semifinals C/D; SE/F=Semifinals E/F; QF=Quarterfinals; R=Repechage

== Sailing ==
Uruguayan sailors qualified one boat in each of the following classes through the class-associated World Championships, and the continental regattas.

Athlete	Event	Race													Net points	Final rank
Athlete	Event	1	2	3	4	5	6	7	8	9	10	11	12	M*	Net points	Final rank
Dolores Moreira	Women's Laser Radial	23	11	17	31	~~33~~	23	24	22	10	12	—		EL	173	22
Pablo Defazio; Dominique Knüppel	Mixed Nacra 17	~~DSQ~~	15	17	17	17	17	11	18	15	16	17	19	EL	179	18

M = Medal race; DSQ = Disqualified; EL = Eliminated – did not advance into the medal race

== Swimming ==
Uruguay received a universality invitation from FINA to send two top-ranked swimmers (one per gender) in their respective individual events to the Olympics, based on the FINA Points System of June 28, 2021.

Athlete	Event	Heat		Semifinal		Final	
Athlete	Event	Time	Rank	Time	Rank	Time	Rank
Enzo Martínez	Men's 50 m freestyle	22.52	35	Did not advance			
Nicole Frank	Women's 200 m individual medley	2:18.93	27	Did not advance			

== See also ==
- Uruguay at the 2019 Pan American Games
