= Shai Kakon =

Israeli sailor

Shai Kakon שי קקון
Personal information
- Nationality: Israeli
- Born: 5 November 2002 (age 24) Hadera, Israel

Sport
- Country: Israel
- Sport: Sailing
- Club: Sdot Yam Sailing Club
- Coached by: Erez Eliyahu
Medal record
Sailing
Representing Israel
Laser Radial World Championship
Bronze medal – third place	2022	Girls
Bronze medal – third place	2019	Girls
Laser Radial European Championships
Bronze medal – third place	2022	U21 Girls
Silver medal – second place	2018	U17 Women
Laser 4.7 Youth World Championships
Silver medal – second place	2017	U16 Women
Laser 4.7 European Championships
Gold medal – first place	2017	U16 Women

Shai Kakon (also Shay Kakon; Hebrew: שי קקון; born 5 November 2002) is an Israeli Olympic sailor. She was the 2017 European Laser 4.7 Youth U16 Girl Champion, and World silver medalist. She was then the 2019 Youth Sailing World Championship Laser Radial Girls silver medalist. She competed for Israel at the 2020 Summer Olympics. She won the 2022 European U21 Championship. Kakon represented Israel at the 2024 Paris Olympics in sailing in Sailing/Laser Radial in Marseille, France, in which she came in 24th.

== Early life ==
Kakon was born and lives in Hadera, Israel.

== Sailing career ==
Her club is the Sdot Yam Sailing Club in Israel. As a child, Kakon began sailing with the Optimist model. Her coach is Erez Eliyahu.

=== 2017–20; U16 European Girl champion ===
At the 2017 Laser 4.7 Youth World Championships, Kakon won the U16 silver medal, in Nieuwpoort, Belgium. She won the gold medal in the 2017 European Laser 4.7 Youth Championships, becoming the new U16 European Girl champion, in Los Alcázares, Spain.

At the 2018 Laser Radial (ILCA 6) Youth European Championships Women's U17, Kakon won the silver medal, in Balatonfoldvar, Hungary.

In the 2019 Youth Sailing World Championship – Laser Radial Girls, she won a bronze medal in Gdynia, Poland.

=== 2020 Tokyo Summer Olympics ===
Kakon represented Israel at the 2020 Summer Olympics in August 2021, at 19 years of age, competing in Laser Radial. She placed 30th overall, and therefore missed the final round. She placed second in the 9th race, and fifth in the 10th race.

=== 2022–present; Paris Olympics ===
In 2022 she became the European U21 Champion, winning the 2022 ILCA U21 European Championships in Lac d'Hourtin-Carcans, France, ahead of Marilena Makri of Cyprus in a race with 61 competitors. At the 2022 Youth World Championships in Gdynia, Poland, Kakon won the bronze medal.

In February 2024 at the 2024 ILCA 6 Women European Championships & Open European Trophy/PARIS2024 Olympic qualification in Athens, Greece, Kakon came in 16th. She won the fifth race.

Kakon represented Israel at the 2024 Paris Olympics in sailing in Sailing/Laser Radial, in Marseille, France, in which she came in 24th.
