= Okyanus Arıkan =

Turkish yacht racer

Personal information
- Born: 8 July 2004 (age 21) İzmir, Turkey

Sport
- Country: Turkey
- Sport: Sailing
- Event: Four-Seventy
- Club: ARM Urla Sail Club

Okyanus Arıkan (born 8 July 2004) is a Turkish yacht racer. She qualified to participate at the Sailing at the 2020 Summer Olympics.

Okyanus Arıkan was born in İzmir on 8 July 2004. She began with sailing sport at the age of six. Already at the age of ten, she was admitted to the Turkey national sail team, and thus became her country's youngest national sportsperson. She won several competitions at national and international level. She competed in the Optimist class before she transferred to the Four-Seventy class. She is a member of the ARM Urla Sail Club in Urla, İzmir. She is also an orange belt in kickboxing.

She qualified to compete at the 2020 Summer Olympics in the women's two-person dinghy – 470 class event with her teammate Beste Kaynakçı. Turkey participated for the first time in that event at the Olympics.
