= 2018 Sailing World Championships =

Event title
- Edition: 5th

Event details
- Venue: Aarhus, Denmark
- Dates: 30 July – 12 August 2018
- Titles: 12

Competitors
- Competing nations: 84
- Qualification(s): 2020 Summer Olympics

The 2018 Hempel Sailing World Championships were held in Aarhus, Denmark, from 30 July to 12 August 2018. It was the fifth edition of the Sailing World Championships. It was the world championships for all disciplines used at the next Olympics. Sailors from 84 nations raced in the waters of the Bay of Aarhus for world championships medals and the possibility to be qualifying for the 2020 Summer Olympics in Tokyo, Japan.

The event took place on the Docklands, at the exact spot where the Vikings founded Aarhus. A new world class sailing centre was the venue for 14 days leaving significant impact on Denmark's sailors and on the further urban development in Aarhus.

== Overview ==
The Sailing World Championships are held every four years, the Worlds is one of the biggest global sailing events in the world. Hempel Sailing World Championships Aarhus 2018 is the first big qualification for the Olympic games in Tokyo 2020. The World Championships included all 10 Olympic boat classes. Kite surfing was added to the programme for the first time. 1,100 sailboats and 1,500 participants from approximately 100 nations are expected to take part in the events. The event expects to draw 400,000 visitors to Aarhus, and more than 800 volunteers.

== Host selection ==
The following cities competed to win the right to host the Championships.

- Aarhus, Denmark
- Busan, South Korea
- The Hague, Netherlands
- Gdynia, Poland

In May 2014, Aarhus was selected host for the championship.

== Venue ==
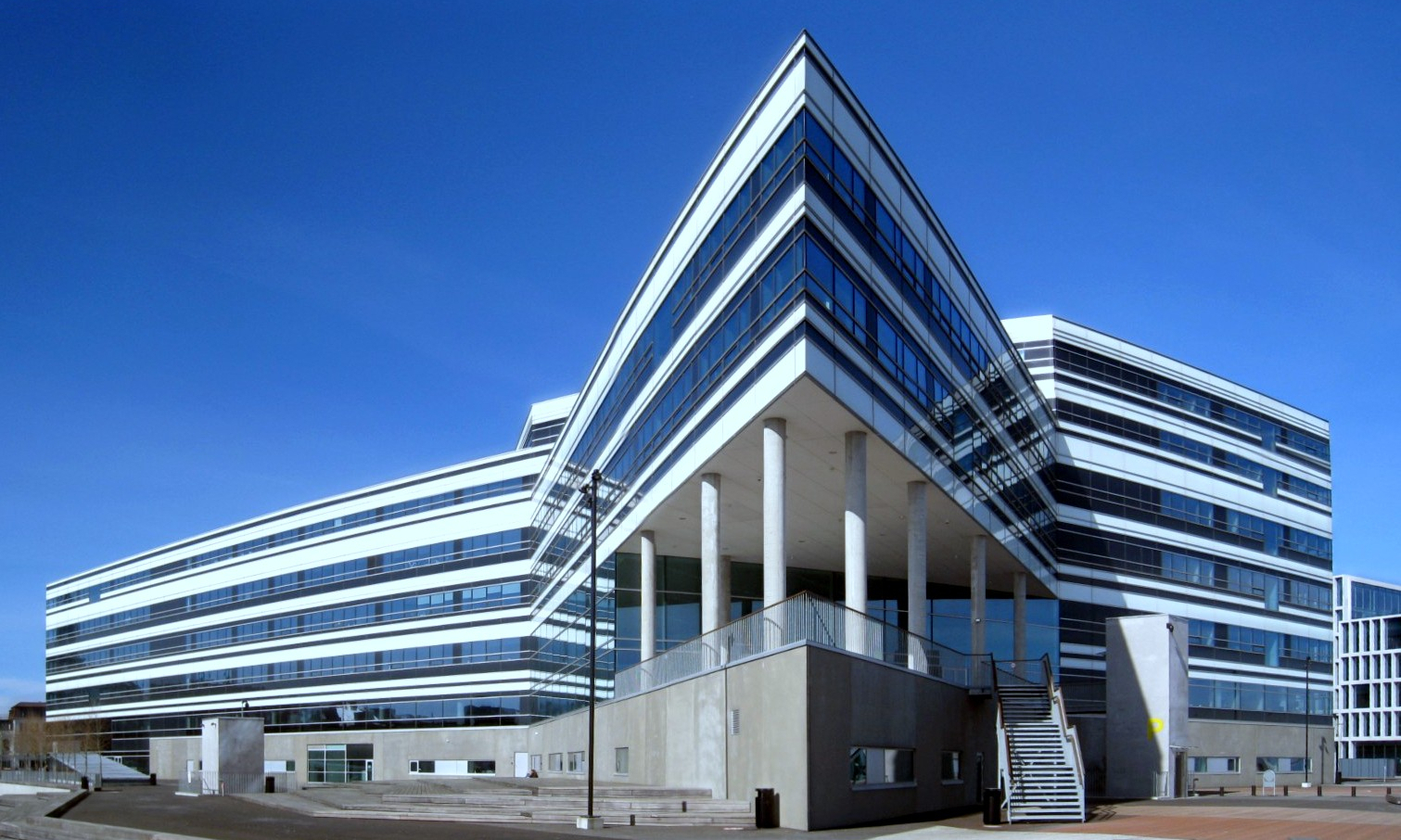
Navitas Park

Sailing was held on Aarhus Bay with the regatta centre at Navitas Park. The venue had earlier hosted the 2008 ISAF Youth Sailing World Championships, the 2010 505 World Championship, the 2011 A-Cat World Championship and the 2013 49er & 49er FX European Championships.

== Competition format ==
=== Events and equipment ===
The following events were open for entries:

Event	Equipment	Max. entries
Men's one-person dinghy	Laser	165
Men's one-person dinghy (heavyweight)	Finn	90
Men's two-person dinghy	470	105
Men's skiff	49er	105
Men's windsurfer	RS:X	100
Men's kiteboarding	Formula Kite	90
Women's one-person dinghy	Laser Radial	120
Women's two-person dinghy	470	70
Women's skiff	49er FX	80
Women's kiteboarding	Formula Kite	30
Women's windsurfer	RS:X	80
Mixed multihull	Foiling Nacra 17	80

=== Competition schedule ===
The competition started on 2 August and finish on 12 August 2018.

●	Racing days

Date → Event ↓	Thu 2	Fri 3	Sat 4	Sun 5	Mon 6	Tue 7	Wed 8	Thu 9	Fri 10	Sat 11	Sun 12
Men's 470	●	●	●	●	●	●	●	●	●		
Women's 470	●	●	●	●	●	●	●	●	●		
Men's 49er			●	●	●	●	●	●	●	●	●
Women's 49er FX			●	●	●	●	●	●	●	●	●
Men's Finn	●	●	●	●	●	●	●	●	●		
Men's Formula Kite				●	●	●	●	●	●	●	●
Women's Formula Kite				●	●	●	●	●	●	●	●
Men's Laser		●	●	●	●	●	●	●	●	●	
Women's Laser Radial		●	●	●	●	●	●	●	●	●	
Mixed Nacra 17				●	●	●	●	●	●	●	●
Men's RS:X				●	●	●	●	●	●	●	●
Women's RS:X				●	●	●	●	●	●	●	●

== Summary ==
=== Medal table ===
* Host nation (Denmark)

Rank	Nation	Gold	Silver	Bronze	Total
1	Netherlands	3	2	1	6
2	France	2	2	3	7
3	Japan	1	1	0	2
4	Belgium	1	0	0	1
4	Croatia	1	0	0	1
4	Cyprus	1	0	0	1
4	Hungary	1	0	0	1
4	Italy	1	0	0	1
4	United States	1	0	0	1
10	Australia	0	2	0	2
11	Great Britain	0	1	2	3
12	Spain	0	1	1	2
13	Austria	0	1	0	1
13	Russia	0	1	0	1
13	Sweden	0	1	0	1
16	Germany	0	0	2	2
17	Argentina	0	0	1	1
17	China	0	0	1	1
17	Denmark*	0	0	1	1
Totals (19 entries)		12	12	12	36

=== Event medalists ===
Event	Gold	Silver	Bronze
Men's 470	Kevin Peponnet; Jérémie Mion; France	Tetsuya Isozaki; Akira Takayanagi; Japan	Jordi Xammar; Nicolás Rodríguez; Spain
Women's 470	Ai Kondo Yoshida; Miho Yoshioka; Japan	Silvia Mas; Patricia Cantero; Spain	Hannah Mills; Eilidh McIntyre; Great Britain
49er	Šime Fantela; Mihovil Fantela; Croatia	Mathieu Frei; Noé Delpech; France	Tim Fischer; Fabian Graf; Germany
49er FX	Annemiek Bekkering; Annette Duetz; Netherlands	Tanja Frank; Lorena Abicht; Austria	Sophie Weguelin; Sophie Ainsworth; Great Britain
Finn	Zsombor Berecz; Hungary	Max Salminen; Sweden	Pieter-Jan Postma; Netherlands
Men's Formula Kite	Nicolas Parlier; France	Guy Bridge; Great Britain	Maxime Nocher; France
Women's Formula Kite	Daniela Moroz; United States	Elena Kalinina; Russia	Alexia Fancelli; France
Laser	Pavlos Kontides; Cyprus	Matthew Wearn; Australia	Philipp Buhl; Germany
Laser Radial	Emma Plasschaert; Belgium	Marit Bouwmeester; Netherlands	Anne-Marie Rindom; Denmark
Nacra 17	Ruggero Tita; Caterina Banti; Italy	Nathan Outteridge; Haylee Outteridge; Australia	Santiago Lange; Cecilia Carranza; Argentina
Men's RS:X	Dorian van Rijsselberghe; Netherlands	Kiran Badloe; Netherlands	Louis Giard; France
Women's RS:X	Lilian de Geus; Netherlands	Charline Picon; France	Lu Yunxiu; China

== Participating national federations ==
Participating national federations and number of boats per federation:

- American Samoa (1)
- Angola (1)
- Argentina (17)
- Aruba (2)
- Australia (44)
- Austria (10)
- Brunei (1)
- Barbados (1)
- Belarus (4)
- Belgium (7)
- Bermuda (3)
- Brazil (16)
- Bulgaria (6)
- Canada (17)
- Chile (4)
- China (22)
- Chinese Taipei (4)
- Colombia (2)
- Croatia (14)
- Cuba (2)
- Cyprus (5)
- Czech Republic (14)
- Denmark (34)
- Dominican Republic (2)
- Ecuador (1)
- El Salvador (1)
- Estonia (7)
- Finland (20)
- France (63)
- French Polynesia (1)
- Germany (39)
- Great Britain (58)
- Greece (14)
- Guatemala (4)
- Hong Kong (7)
- Hungary (9)
- Iceland (1)
- India (1)
- Indonesia (1)
- Iran (1)
- Ireland (10)
- Israel (18)
- Italy (46)
- Japan (44)
- Latvia (2)
- Lithuania (5)
- Malaysia (5)
- Malta (1)
- Mauritius (1)
- Mexico (7)
- Monaco (1)
- Montenegro (2)
- Morocco (1)
- Mozambique (1)
- Namibia (1)
- Netherlands (24)
- New Zealand (21)
- Norway (13)
- Peru (4)
- Poland (30)
- Portugal (7)
- Puerto Rico (1)
- Qatar (1)
- Romania (2)
- Russia (32)
- Saint Lucia (1)
- Serbia (1)
- Seychelles (2)
- Singapore (6)
- Slovakia (3)
- Slovenia (9)
- South Africa (1)
- South Korea (6)
- Spain (37)
- Sweden (22)
- Switzerland (14)
- Thailand (3)
- Trinidad and Tobago (2)
- Turkey (14)
- Ukraine (7)
- United Arab Emirates (1)
- United States (45)
- Uruguay (4)
- Venezuela (3)
