= Marie Bolou =

French sailor (born 1992)

Personal information
- Nationality: France
- Born: 27 November 1992 (age 33) Quimper, France
- Height: 1.73 m (5 ft 8 in)

Sailing career
- Sport: Sailing
- Club: CN Lorient
- Classes: Laser Radial (ILCA 6); Laser 4.7 (ILCA 4)

Marie Bolou (born 27 November 1992) is a French competitive sailor.

At the 2020 Summer Olympics, held July–August 2021 in Tokyo, she competed for France in Laser Radial.
