= Robert Dickson (sailor) =

Irish sailor

Personal information
- Born: 6 March 1998 (age 28)

Sailing career
- Sport: Sailing

Robert Dickson (born 6 March 1998) is an Irish sailor. He competed at the 2020 Summer Olympics in the 49er class together with Sean Waddilove. They were disqualified from two races because one of the trapeze harnesses used by the Irish pair (that of the helm) weighed 90 grams more than the maximum of 2 kg.
