= Beste Kaynakçı =

Turkish sailor (born 1994)

Personal information
- Born: 30 April 1994 (age 32) Konak, İzmir, Turkey

Sport
- Country: Turkey
- Sport: Sailing
- Event: Four-Seventy
- Club: ARM Urla Sail Club

Beste Kaynakçı (born 30 April 1994) is a Turkish sailor competing in the Dinghy 470 class. She qualified to participate at the Sailing at the 2020 Summer Olympics.

== Early life and career ==
Beste Kaynakçı was born in Konak, İzmir on 30 April 1994. She began sailing in 2007. She competed in the Optimist, 420 Dinghy, and Four-Seventy classes, and won several titles in national and international competitions. She is a member of the ARM Urla Sail Club in Urla, İzmir.

She qualified to compete at the 2020 Summer Olympics in the women's two-person dinghy – 470 class event with her teammate Okyanus Arıkan. Turkey will participate for the first time in that event at the Olympics.
