= Sailing at the 2020 Summer Olympics – Men's RS:X =

Men's RS:X at the Games of the XXXII Olympiad
- Line drawing of the RS:X
- Venues: Enoshima Yacht Harbor
- Dates: 25–31 July 2021
- Competitors: 25 from 25 nations

Medalists
1st place, gold medalist(s)		Kiran Badloe	Netherlands
2nd place, silver medalist(s)		Thomas Goyard	France
3rd place, bronze medalist(s)		Bi Kun	China

The men's RS:X competition at the 2020 Summer Olympics was the men's windsurfer event and was held in Enoshima, Japan, from 25 July to 31 July 2021. 25 sailors from 25 nations competed in 13 races, including one medal-race where points were doubled. The land venue was Enoshima Yacht Harbour and races were held on Sagami Bay.

Medals were presented by IOC Member for Israel, Mr Alex Gilady and World Sailing President Li Quanhai.

== Schedule ==
Sun 25 Jul	Mon 26 Jul	Tue 27 Jul	Wed 28 Jul	Thu 29 Jul	Fri 30 Jul	Sat 31 Jul
Race 1 Race 2 Race 3	Race 4 Race 5 Race 6	Rest day	Race 7 Race 8 Race 9	Race 10; Race 11; Race 12	Rest day	Medal race

== Results ==
Results of individual races
Pos	Helmsman	Country	I	II	III	IV	V	VI	VII	VIII	IX	X	XI	XII	MR	Tot	Pts
1st place, gold medalist(s)	Kiran Badloe	Netherlands	5	7	1	1	26^{†} (DSQ)	5	2	4	1	5	1	1	4	63	37
2nd place, silver medalist(s)	Thomas Goyard	France	13^{†}	5	3	13	1	1	3	6	7	1	9	3	22 (OCS)	87	74
3rd place, bronze medalist(s)	Bi Kun	China	7	9	16	4	13	26^{†} (DSQ)	1	3	2	4	2	6	8	101	75
4	Yoav Cohen	Israel	12	6	2	7	6	6	6	7	16^{†}	6	4	12	2	92	76
5	Mattia Camboni	Italy	4	2	4	8	2	2	8	13^{†}	4	8	3	9	22 (OCS)	89	76
6	Piotr Myszka	Poland	11^{†}	4	6	3	5	11	5	2	5	9	5	2	22 (OCS)	90	79
7	Tom Squires	Great Britain	9	13	14^{†}	2	10	3	4	1	8	2	6	10	14	96	82
8	Mateo Sanz Lanz	Switzerland	1	1	9	10	3	4	16	17^{†}	12	10	13	15	6	117	100
9	Pedro Pascual	United States	6	12	7	9	4	13	7	5	14	14	16^{†}	7	12	126	110
10	Ángel Granda Roque	Spain	2	3	13	14	12	15	15	9	10	18^{†}	7	8	10	136	118
11	Byron Kokkalanis	Greece	8	17	10	5	26^{†} (DNF)	8	18	19	6	7	8	4		136	110
12	Andreas Cariolou	Cyprus	18	20^{†}	15	6	9	7	11	8	17	3	10	14		138	118
13	Michael Cheng	Hong Kong	3	8	8	12	8	9	13	22^{†}	15	15	15	13		141	119
14	Endre Funnemark	Norway	14	16	5	11	11	26^{†} (DSQ)	9	10	3	19	12	16		152	126
15	Juozas Bernotas	Lithuania	23	11	12	15	26^{†} (DNF)	10	12	18	13	12	14	5		171	145
16	Makoto Tomizawa	Japan	10	21	11	16	26^{†} (DNF)	14	17	11	11	16	11	11		175	149
17	Cho Won-woo	South Korea	22	15	21	22	7	26^{†} (UFD)	10	14	9	11	18	18		193	167
18	Mikita Tsirkun	Belarus	17	10	23	17	26^{†} (DNF)	19	21	12	18	23	20	20		226	200
19	Aleksandr Askerov	ROC	19	18	17	20	26^{†} (DNF)	16	20	15	19	22	19	23		234	208
20	Onur Cavit Biriz	Turkey	15	19	20	19	26^{†} (DNF)	12	23	20	23	21	21	17		236	210
21	Francisco Saubidet	Argentina	16	14	19	21	26^{†} (DNF)	17	14	26 (UFD)	22	20	22	21		238	212
22	Karel Lavicky	Czech Republic	20	25	22	23	26^{†} (DNF)	26 (UFD)	19	16	21	17	17	19		251	225
23	Ignacio Berenguer	Mexico	25	22	18	18	26^{†} (DNF)	26 (DNF)	22	23	20	13	23	22		258	232
24	Natthaphong Phonoppharat	Thailand	24	24	25	24	26^{†} (DNF)	20	24	21	24	24	24	24		284	258
25	Hamza Bouras	Algeria	21	23	24	25	26^{†} (DNF)	18	25	24	25	25	25	25		286	260

Scoring system: low-point system;
Legend: – Qualified for medal race(s); DNF – Did not finish; DPI – Discretionary penalty imposed; OCS – On the course side of the starting line; RDG – Redress given; UFD – "U" flag disqualification; † – Discarded race not counted in the overall result;
