= Lovisa Karlsson =

Swedish sailor

Personal information
- Full name: Emma Lovisa Karlsson
- Nationality: Swedish
- Born: 24 May 1995 (age 31) Gothenburg, Sweden

Sailing career
- Sport: Sailing
- Club: Royal Gothenburg Yacht Club
- Class(es): 470, ILCA 6, Europe
Medal record
Women's sailing
Representing Sweden
Olympic Games
Bronze medal – third place	2024 Paris	470 mixed
European Championships
Gold medal – first place	2022 Çeşme	Mixed 470
Gold medal – first place	2023 Sanremo	Mixed 470

Emma Lovisa Karlsson (born 24 May 1995) is a Swedish sailor. She has represented Sweden at the Summer Olympics on two occasions, winning bronze in 2024 mixed470 event, and won the 2022 European Championships in the mixed 470 event.

Karlsson represents the Royal Gothenburg Yacht Club.

== Sailing career ==
=== 2020 Olympics with Bergström ===
Lovisa Karlsson, together with Olivia Bergström, qualified to represent Sweden in the 2020 Tokyo Summer Olympics, competing in the women's 470 event and ranking 14th.

=== Mixed 470 with Dahlberg (since 2022) ===
After the 2020 Summer Olympics and the end of the women's 470 event in the Olympics, Karlsson teamed up with Anton Dahlberg, silver medalist in the men's event in the same Olympics, to campaign for the 2024 Summer Olympics. They made their first regatta together in the 2022 Semaine Olympique Française in Hyères, which they won.

In September 2022, Dahlberg and Karlsson won the 470 European Championships in Çeşme, Turkey. At the 2022 470 World Championship in Sdot Yam a month later, they finished 13th and therefore not qualified for the medal race.

Dahlberg and Karlsson successfully defended their 470 European Championships title in May 2023 in Sanremo, one point ahead of German crew Anna Markfort and Simon Diesch.

At the 2024 Olympic sailing event in Marseille, Dahlberg and Karlsson were sitting fourth ahead of the medal race in the event, and overtook Spain to win the bronze medal.
