= Sailing at the 2020 Summer Olympics – Laser Radial =

Women's Laser Radial at the Games of the XXXII Olympiad
- Venues: Kamakura, Japan; Enoshima, Japan; Fujisawa, Japan
- Dates: 25 July – 1 August 2021
- Competitors: 44 from 44 nations

Medalists
1st place, gold medalist(s)		Anne-Marie Rindom	Denmark
2nd place, silver medalist(s)		Josefin Olsson	Sweden
3rd place, bronze medalist(s)		Marit Bouwmeester	Netherlands

The women's Laser Radial was a sailing event at the 2020 Summer Olympics that took place from 25 July to 1 August at Kamakura. 11 races (the last one a medal race) were scheduled.

Medals were presented by IOC Member for Cuba Mrs Maria de la Caridad Colon Ruenes and World Sailing Chief Executive Officer David Graham.

== Schedule ==
Sun 25 Jul	Mon 26 Jul	Tue 27 Jul	Wed 28 Jul	Thu 29 Jul	Fri 30 Jul	Sat 31 Jul	Sun 1 Aug
Race 1 Race 2	Race 3 Race 4	Race 5 Race 6	Rest day	Race 7 Race 8	Race 9 Race 10	Rest day	Medal race

== Results ==
Results of individual races
Pos	Helmsman	Country	I	II	III	IV	V	VI	VII	VIII	IX	X	MR	Tot	Pts
Gold medal	Anne-Marie Rindom	Denmark	6	5	3	13	4	4	2	1	26	45^{†} DNF	7	123	78
Silver medal	Josefin Olsson	Sweden	34^{†}	15	8	4	1	6	4	9	22	10	1	115	81
Bronze medal	Marit Bouwmeester	Netherlands	21	14	7	2	3	9	45^{†} BFD	7	1	7	6	128	83
4	Emma Plasschaert	Belgium	10	17	11	8	6	5	5	4	17	21^{†}	2	108	87
5	Tuula Tenkanen	Finland	9	6	14	33^{†}	5	3	6	3	32	9	4	128	95
6	Sarah Douglas	Canada	18	4	4	26^{†}	8	24	13	5	4	2	9	126	100
7	Silvia Zennaro	Italy	13	20^{†}	2	6	17	11	3	10	9	13	22 OCS	126	106
8	Line Flem Høst	Norway	20	3	1	3	10	25^{†}	12	6	24	22	5	136	111
9	Vasileia Karachaliou	Greece	2	19	6	1	21	21	9	26^{†}	19	8	3	138	112
10	Alison Young	Great Britain	24	8	9	20	12	12	10	8	14	27^{†}	8	159	133
11	Marie Bolou	France	28	27	5	15	7	2	16	14	7	33^{†}		154	121
12	Elena Vorobeva	Croatia	11	2	13	41^{†}	16	15	7	21	18	23		167	126
13	Mária Érdi	Hungary	19	18	16	16	2	17	14	11	15	25^{†}		153	128
14	Mara Stransky	Australia	12	26	19	10	19	16	45^{†} BFD	24	3	1		175	130
15	Manami Doi	Japan	16	9	10	23	11	28^{†}	15	16	13	17		158	130
16	Svenja Weger	Germany	5	1	21	29^{†}	14	29	8	12	12	29		160	131
17	Magdalena Kwaśna	Poland	7	28	18	11	15	18	18	13	25	31^{†}		184	153
18	Annalise Murphy	Ireland	35	12	24	37	9	10	1	2	30	40^{†}		200	160
19	Maud Jayet	Switzerland	22	7	22	34^{†}	13	1	21	25	28	24		197	163
20	Ecem Güzel	Turkey	4	24	12	17	28	30^{†}	11	29	27	20		202	172
21	Tatiana Drozdovskaya	Belarus	25^{†}	22	20	25	20	8	17	19	23	19		198	173
22	Dolores Moreira	Uruguay	23	11	17	31	33^{†}	23	24	22	10	12		206	173
23	Cristina Pujol	Spain	1	23	23	28	24	26	30	33^{†}	20	4		212	179
24	Zhang Dongshuang	China	31	33	30	7	27	20	45^{†} BFD	28	6	6		233	188
25	Viktorija Andrulytė	Lithuania	38^{†}	10	29	24	26	19	23	27	33	3		232	194
26	Nur Shazrin Mohamad Latif	Malaysia	3	25	33	14	30	34^{†}	28	30	16	15		228	194
27	Ekaterina Zyuzina	ROC	15	31	35	12	31	22	45^{†} BFD	18	8	26		243	198
28	Stephanie Devaux-Lovell	Saint Lucia	14	36	34	5	35	27	45^{†} BFD	38	11	16		261	216
29	Isabella Maegli	Guatemala	26	29	32	9	34	40^{†}	31	34	5	18		258	218
30	Shay Kakon	Israel	39^{†}	13	38	18	39	32	34	39	2	5		259	220
31	Lucía Falasca	Argentina	37	38	27	21	18	14	20	15	40^{†}	30		260	220
32	Elena Oetling	Mexico	41	21	31	19	23	7	19	32	43^{†}	28		264	221
33	Marilena Makri	Cyprus	8	30	26	27	22	31	25	23	39^{†}	35		266	227
34	Carolina João	Portugal	32	34	28	30	36^{†}	13	26	31	21	14		265	229
35	Nethra Kumanan	India	33	16	15	40^{†}	32	38	22	20	37	38		291	251
36	Paloma Schmidt	Peru	17	29	39^{†}	38	29	35	32	35	31	11		304	265
37	Paige Railey	United States	40	45^{†} UFD	25	36	25	45 UFD	27	17	34	39		333	288
38	Kamolwan Chanyim	Thailand	27	32	36	32	38^{†}	36	29	36	35	34		336	298
39	Stephanie Norton	Hong Kong	29	35	37	22	37	33	33	37	41	42^{†}		346	304
40	Deizy Nhaquile	Mozambique	30	41	44^{†}	39	44	41	35	44	29	37		384	340
41	Khouloud Mansy	Egypt	36	39	43	42	43	36	45^{†} BFD	40	36	32		392	347
42	Sophia Morgan	Fiji	43^{†}	40	41	35	42	43	36	41	42	36		399	356
43	Jalese Gordon	Antigua and Barbuda	42	43^{†}	42	43	41	42	37	42	38	41		411	368
44	Rose-Lee Numa	Papua New Guinea	44^{†}	42	40	44	40	39	38	43	44	43		417	373

Legend: – Qualified for medal race(s); BFD – Black flag disqualification; DNF – Did not finish; DPI – Discretionary penalty imposed; OCS – On the course side of the starting line; RDG – Redress given; UFD – "U" flag disqualification; † – Discarded race not counted in the overall result;
