= Onur Cavit Biriz =

Turkish windsurfer (born 1998)

Personal information
- Full name: Onur Cavit Biriz
- Nationality: Turkish
- Born: 16 October 1998 (age 27) Istanbul
- Height: 186 cm (6 ft 1 in)

Sport
- Country: Turkey
- Sport: Windsurfing
- Event(s): IQFoil, RS:X
- Club: Fenerbahçe S.K.
Medal record
Sailboard
Representing Turkey
Olympic Games
2016 Rio	Men's RS:X
2020 Tokyo	Men's RS:X

Onur Cavit Biriz (born 16 October 1998) is a Turkish windsurfer, who currently competes in IQFoil class. He is a student at Izmir University of Economics. He is an alumnus of Cağaloğlu Anadolu Lisesi.

Biriz competed as the youngest sailor at the 2016 Summer Olympics. He took the 35th place at the 2016 Summer Olympics and the 20th place at the 2020 Summer Olympics.

Biriz won the silver medal at the 2023 French Olimpic Week in Hyeres, and the silver medal at the 2023 IQFoil International Games in Torbole.

In his early years, Biriz became champion in the Techno 293 class of 2013 Atatürk Cup Turkish Windsurf Championship held in Istanbul. He took first place in RS:X Youth Turkish Championship in 2014. Biriz had 13th place in 2015 ISAF Youth RS:X World Championship held in Malaysia.
