= Sailing at the 2020 Summer Olympics =

Sailing at the Games of the XXXII Olympiad
- Venues: Enoshima Yacht Harbor
- Dates: 25 July – 4 August 2021
- No. of events: 10
- Competitors: 350 (175 male and 175 female)

Sailing competitions at the 2020 Summer Olympics in Tokyo took place from 25 July to 4 August 2021 at the Enoshima Yacht Harbor in Enoshima. The venue was also used for the 1964 Olympic Games although significantly regenerated, the IOC now encouraging regeneration, cost reductions and sustainability. The RS:X, Laser, Laser Radial, Finn, 470, 49er, 49erFX, and Nacra17 are all returning for 2020; there are no significant changes to the Olympic programme from 2016.

== Competition format ==
=== Qualification ===
The number of sailors competing has been reduced from 380 to 350, with an equal number of male and female athletes for the first time ever.

The qualification period commenced at the 2018 Sailing World Championships in Aarhus, Denmark. There, 101 places, about forty percent of the total quota, will be awarded to the highest finishing nations. Six places will be available in the men's Laser and women's Laser Radial classes at the 2018 Asian Games and 2019 Pan American Games, whereas sixty-one more will be distributed to the sailors at the World Championships for all boats in 2019. Continental qualification regattas were held to decide the remainder of the total quota, while two spots each in the one-person dinghy classes were granted to eligible NOCs through the Tripartite Commission Invitation.

As hosts, Japan has been guaranteed one quota place in each of the ten classes.

=== Classes (equipment) ===
The events remained unchanged for 2020 which was unusual with the only significant change being the Nacra 17 changing to a foiling configuration.

=== Scoring ===
The format for the 2020 Olympics is fleet racing, where all competitors start and sail the course together. They are scored according to the low-point system, where first place is scored 1, second place is scored 2, etc. There is a series of preliminary races followed by the final Medal Race. The RS:X, 49er, 49erFX, and Nacra 17 classes have 12 preliminary races, other classes have 10.

At the end of the preliminary races, the top ten boats in each class (i.e. those with the lowest total scores) advance to the Medal Race. Each boat might exclude one race from their total. The Medal Race cannot be excluded from the series score and counts double. The boat with the lowest overall total after all races is the winner. Any ties in the final rankings are broken in favour of the competitor/crew finishing higher in the Medal Race.

== Competition schedule ==
=== Actual Schedule ===
Legend

S	Series Race	MR	Medal Race (Top 10 Double Scoring)

Schedule
Date	Jul 25	Jul 26	Jul 27	Jul 28	Jul 29	Jul 30	July 31	Aug 1	Aug 2	Aug 3	Aug 4
Men's RS:X	S			S			MR				
Men's Laser	S				S			MR			
Men's Finn			S				S			MR	
Men's 470				S				S		S	MR
Men's 49er			S							MR	
Women's RS:X	S			S			MR				
Women's Laser Radial	S				S			MR			
Women's 470				S				S		H	MR
Women's 49erFX			S			S				MR	
Nacra 17				S			S			MR	

=== Original Schedule ===
Legend

S	Series Race	MR	Medal Race (Top 10 Double Scoring)

Schedule
Date	Jul 25	Jul 26	Jul 27	Jul 28	Jul 29	Jul 30	July 31	Aug 1	Aug 2	Aug 3	Aug 4
Men's RS:X	S1, S2, S3	S4, S5, S6		S7, S8, S9	S10, S11, S12	MR					
Men's Laser	S				H			MR			
Men's Finn			S				S			MR	
Men's 470				S				S			MR
Men's 49er			S			S			MR		
Women's RS:X	S			S			MR				
Women's Laser Radial	S				S			MR			
Women's 470				S				S			MR
Women's 49erFX			S			S			MR		
Nacra 17				S			S			MR	

== Participating nations ==
- Algeria (2)
- Angola (2)
- Antigua and Barbuda (1)
- Argentina (11)
- American Samoa (1)
- Australia (13)
- Austria (6)
- Belarus (2)
- Belgium (4)
- Brazil (13)
- Canada (9)
- Chile (1)
- China (12)
- Croatia (4)
- Cyprus (4)
- Czech Republic (1)
- Denmark (8)
- El Salvador (1)
- Egypt (1)
- Estonia (2)
- Fiji (1)
- Finland (5)
- France (14)
- Germany (10)
- Great Britain (15)
- Greece (8)
- Guatemala (2)
- Hong Kong (3)
- Hungary (4)
- India (4)
- Ireland (3)
- Israel (5)
- Italy (9)
- Japan (15)
- Lithuania (2)
- Malaysia (4)
- Mexico (4)
- Montenegro (1)
- Mozambique (3)
- Netherlands (10)
- New Zealand (10)
- Norway (8)
- Papua New Guinea (2)
- Peru (5)
- Poland (9)
- Portugal (5)
- Puerto Rico (2)
- ROC (6)
- Saint Lucia (2)
- Samoa (1)
- Seychelles (1)
- Singapore (3)
- Slovenia (3)
- South Africa (3)
- South Korea (4)
- Spain (15)
- Sweden (9)
- Switzerland (6)
- Thailand (3)
- Trinidad and Tobago (1)
- Tunisia (4)
- Turkey (8)
- United States (13)
- Uruguay (3)
- Venezuela (1)

== Medal summary ==
=== Medal table ===
* Host nation (Japan)

Rank	NOC	Gold	Silver	Bronze	Total
1	Great Britain	3	1	1	5
2	Australia	2	0	0	2
3	Netherlands	1	0	2	3
4	China	1	0	1	2
5	Brazil	1	0	0	1
5	Denmark	1	0	0	1
5	Italy	1	0	0	1
8	France	0	2	1	3
9	Sweden	0	2	0	2
10	Germany	0	1	2	3
11	Croatia	0	1	0	1
11	Hungary	0	1	0	1
11	New Zealand	0	1	0	1
11	Poland	0	1	0	1
15	Spain	0	0	2	2
16	Norway	0	0	1	1
Totals (16 entries)		10	10	10	30

=== Men's events ===
Event	Gold	Silver	Bronze
RS:X	Kiran Badloe; Netherlands	Thomas Goyard; France	Bi Kun; China
Laser	Matthew Wearn; Australia	Tonči Stipanović; Croatia	Hermann Tomasgaard; Norway
Finn	Giles Scott; Great Britain	Zsombor Berecz; Hungary	Joan Cardona Méndez; Spain
470	Australia; Mathew Belcher; Will Ryan	Sweden; Anton Dahlberg; Fredrik Bergström	Spain; Jordi Xammar; Nicolás Rodríguez
49er	Great Britain; Dylan Fletcher; Stuart Bithell	New Zealand; Peter Burling; Blair Tuke	Germany; Erik Heil; Thomas Plößel

=== Women's events ===
Event	Gold	Silver	Bronze
RS:X	Lu Yunxiu; China	Charline Picon; France	Emma Wilson; Great Britain
Laser Radial	Anne-Marie Rindom; Denmark	Josefin Olsson; Sweden	Marit Bouwmeester; Netherlands
470	Great Britain; Hannah Mills; Eilidh McIntyre	Poland; Agnieszka Skrzypulec; Jolanta Ogar	France; Camille Lecointre; Aloïse Retornaz
49erFX	Brazil; Martine Grael; Kahena Kunze	Germany; Tina Lutz; Susann Beucke	Netherlands; Annemiek Bekkering; Annette Duetz

=== Mixed events ===
Event	Gold	Silver	Bronze
Nacra 17	Italy; Ruggero Tita; Caterina Banti	Great Britain; John Gimson; Anna Burnet	Germany; Paul Kohlhoff; Alica Stuhlemmer

== See also ==
- Sailing at the 2018 Asian Games
- Sailing at the 2019 Pan American Games
