= Eri Hatayama =

Japanese sailor

Personal information
- Nationality: Japanese
- Born: 5 May 1992 (age 32)

Sailing career
- Class: Nacra 17

Eri Hatayama (Japanese: 畑山 絵里, born 5 May 1992) is a Japanese sailor. She competed in the Nacra 17 event at the 2020 Summer Olympics.
