= Hamza Bouras =

Algerian windsurfer (born 1987)

Personal information
- Born: 16 December 1987 (age 37) Rouïba, Algeria
- Height: 170 cm (5 ft 7 in)
- Weight: 73 kg (161 lb)

Sport

Sailing career
- Class: RS:X
- Club: Amal Riadhi Baladiet El-Marsa

Hamza Bouras (Arabic: حمزة بوراس, born 16 December 1987 in Rouïba) is an Algerian sailor. He placed 36th in the men's RS:X event at the 2016 Summer Olympics.

He competed at the 2020 Summer Olympics in the men's RS:X event where he placed 25th.
