= Juni Karimah Noor Jamali =

Malaysian sailor

Personal information
- Full name: Juni Karimah binti Noor Jamali
- Nationality: Malaysian
- Born: 31 October 2002 (age 23) Kedah, Malaysia

Sport
- Sport: Sailing
Medal record
Women's Sailing
Representing Malaysia
SEA Games
Silver medal – second place	2025 Thailand	470

Juni Karimah binti Noor Jamali (born 31 October 2002) is a Malaysian sailor. She competed in the women's 470 event at the 2020 Summer Olympics.
