= Hu Xiaoxiao =

Chinese sailor

Personal information
- Nationality: Chinese
- Born: 16 July 1999 (age 25)

Sport
- Sport: Sailing

Hu Xiaoxiao (Chinese: 胡笑笑, born 16 July 1999) is a Chinese sailor. She competed in the Nacra 17 event at the 2020 Summer Olympics.
