= Teariki Numa =

Papua New Guinean sailor

Personal information
- Nationality: Papua New Guinean
- Born: 6 June 1999 (age 25)

Sport
- Sport: Sailing

Teariki Numa (born 6 June 1999) is a Papua New Guinean sailor. He competed in the Laser event at the 2020 Summer Olympics.
