= Mehdi Gharbi =

Tunisian sailor

Personal information
- Full name: Mehdi Al-Gharbi
- Nationality: Tunisian
- Born: 5 February 1999 (age 26); La Marsa, Tunisia
- Height: 1.72 m (5 ft 8 in)

Sailing career
- Class: Nacra 17

Mehdi Gharbi (Arabic: مهدي الغربي, born 5 February 1999) is a Tunisian sailor. He competed in the Nacra 17 event at the 2020 Summer Olympics. His father Hedi represented Tunisia in sailing at the 2016 Summer Olympics.
