= Nuraisyah Jamil =

Malaysian sailor

Personal information
- Nationality: Malaysian
- Born: 12 July 1996 (age 29) Johor, Malaysia

Sailing career
- Sport: Sailing
Medal record
Women's Sailing
Representing Malaysia
Asian Games
Silver medal – second place	2014 Incheon	420
Bronze medal – third place	2018 Jakarta-Palembang	470
Southeast Asian Games
Silver medal – second place	2017 Kuala Lumpur	470
Silver medal – second place	2013 Naypyidaw	420

Nuraisyah Jamil (born 12 July 1996) is a Malaysian sailor. She competed in the women's 470 event at the 2020 Summer Olympics.
