= Kazumasa Segawa =

Japanese sailor (born 1989)

Personal information
- Nationality: Japanese
- Born: 24 August 1989 (age 36) Sakai, Japan

Sport

Sailing career
- Class(es): ILCA 7, Finn

Kazumasa Segawa (Japanese: 瀬川 和正, Segawa Kazumasa, born 24 August 1989) is a Japanese sailor. He competed in the Finn event at the 2020 Summer Olympics.
