= Gretchen Ortiz =

Puerto Rican sailor

Gretchen Ortiz Pacheco (Note: In this Spanish name, the first or paternal surname is Ortiz and the second or maternal family name is Pacheco.) (born June 3, 1986) is a Puerto Rican sailor.

She represented Puerto Rico at the 2020 Summer Olympics, ranking 17th in the mixed Nacra 17 event alongside Enrique Figueroa Suarez.
