= Jalese Gordon =

Antigua and Barbuda sailor

Personal information
- Nationality: Antigua and Barbuda
- Born: 8 November 2001 (age 23)

Sport
- Sport: Sailing

Jalese Gordon (born 8 November 2001) is an Antigua and Barbuda sailor. She competed in the Laser Radial event at the 2020 Summer Olympics.
