= Luke Muller =

American sailor

Personal information
- Nationality: American
- Born: March 14, 1996 (age 30) Fort Pierce, Florida, U.S.

Sailing career
- Sport: Sailing
- College team: Stanford University
- Club: St. Francis Yacht Club
- Coached by: Luther Carpenter
- Classes: ILCA 7, Finn, ILCA 6

Luke Muller (born March 14, 1996) is an American sailor. He competed in the Finn event at the 2020 Summer Olympics.
