= Luise Wanser =

German sailor

Personal information
- Nationality: German
- Born: 7 June 1997 (age 27); Essen, Germany

Sport
- Sport: Sailing

Luise Wanser (born 7 June 1997) is a German sailor. She competed in the women's 470 event at the 2020 Summer Olympics.
