= Rania Rahali =

Tunisian sailor

Personal information
- Nationality: Tunisian
- Born: 20 November 1990 (age 34)

Sport
- Sport: Sailing

Rania Rahali (born 20 November 1990) is a Tunisian sailor. She competed in the Nacra 17 event at the 2020 Summer Olympics.
