= Žan Luka Zelko =

Slovenian sailor

Personal information
- Born: 4 November 1994 (age 31) Maribor, Slovenia
- Height: 188 cm (6 ft 2 in)

Sport

Sailing career
- Class: ILCA 7

Žan Luka Zelko (born 4 November 1994) is a Slovenian sailor. He competed in the Laser event at the 2020 Summer Olympics.
