= Nicholas Fadler Martinsen =

Norwegian sailor

Personal information
- Nationality: Norwegian
- Born: 29 May 1994 (age 31) Bergen, Norway
- Height: 182 cm (6 ft 0 in)

Sport

Sailing career
- Class(es): Nacra 17, Europe, ILCA 7
- Club: Royal Norwegian Yacht Club

Nicholas Fadler Martinsen (born 29 May 1994) is a Norwegian competitive sailor, born in Bergen. He qualified to represent Norway at the 2020 Summer Olympics in Tokyo 2021, competing in Nacra 17.
