= Bianca Caruso =

Italian sailor

Personal information
- Nationality: Italian
- Born: 25 May 1996 (age 30) Rome, Italy

Sailing career
- Sport: Sailing
- Club: Circolo Canottieri Aniene
- Class: 470
Medal record
Women's sailing
Representing Italy
World Championships
Bronze medal – third place	2021 Vilamoura	470

Bianca Caruso (born 25 May 1996) is an Italian sailor. She and Elena Berta won the bronze medal at the 2021 470 World Championships. They were officially named to the Italian team on 19 March 2021. They competed in 470 at the 2020 Summer Olympics.
