= Ángel Granda =

Spanish windsurfer

Personal information
- Full name: Ángel Granda Roque
- Nationality: Spanish
- Born: 19 August 1997 (age 28) Las Palmas, Spain
- Height: 1.71 m (5 ft 7 in)

Sailing career
- Sport: Sailing
- Club: Real Club Nautico de Gran Canaria
- Class: Techno 293, RS:X

Ángel Granda Roque (born 19 August 1997) is a Spanish sailor who competed at the 2020 Summer Olympics.

Granda started windsurfing at the age of 11 at the Real Club Nautico de Gran Canaria and made his major competitive debut at the 2011 U15 World Championships in San Francisco. He claimed the under-21 title at the 2017 RS:X World Championships, finishing 15th overall in the competition.

In March 2021, Granda was announced as Spain's representative in the men's RS:X event at the delayed 2020 Summer Olympics. At the Tokyo Games he placed tenth in the qualifiers to secure his spot in the medal race.
