= Belén Tavella =

Argentine sailor

Personal information
- Full name: María Belén Tavella
- Born: 13 December 1990 (age 35) Buenos Aires, Argentina

Sailing career
- Sport: Sailing
- Class(es): 49erFX, 470, 49er, 29er
Medal record
South American Championships
First place	2020 Mar del Plata	470
Second place	2018 San Isidro	470

María Belén Tavella (born 13 December 1990), known as Belén Tavella, is an Argentine sailor. She was born in Buenos Aires, Argentina. Tavella competed in the women's 470 event at the 2020 Summer Olympics. She studied biochemistry at the University of Buenos Aires, but had to pause her postgraduate studies in 2019 to focus on yachting.
