= Francisco Guaragna Rigonat =

Argentine sailor

Francisco Guaragna
Personal information
- Full name: Francisco Guaragna Rigonat
- Nickname: Pancho
- Born: 7 February 1997 (age 29) Rufino, Argentina

Sport

Sailing career
- Class(es): ILCA 7, ILCA 4, ILCA 6

Francisco Guaragna Rigonat (Note: In this Spanish name, the first or paternal surname is Guaragna and the second or maternal family name is Rigonat.) (born 7 February 1997) is an Argentine sailor. He competed in the Laser event at the 2020 Summer Olympics.
