= Anastasiya Winkel =

German sailor

Personal information
- Nationality: German
- Born: 23 October 1993 (age 32) Alchevsk, Luhansk Oblast, Ukraine

Sport
- Sport: Sailing

Anastasiya Winkel, née Krasko (born 23 October 1993), is a German sailor. She competed in the women's 470 event at the 2020 Summer Olympics.

While representing her home country of Ukraine at the 2014 Junior European Championships, Winkel met her future husband Malte Winkel, who was competing for Germany. After having a long-distance relationship, she moved to Germany in 2016 and became a naturalized citizen in 2021.
