= Manon Audinet =

French sailor

Personal information
- Nationality: French
- Born: 12 February 1992 (age 34) La Rochelle, France
- Height: 1.68 m (5 ft 6 in)

Sailing career
- Sport: Sailing
- Classes: Formula 18, Nacra 17, Sirena SL16

Manon Audinet (born 12 February 1992) is a French offshore sailor. She and Quentin Delapierre also competed for France at the 2020 Summer Olympics in the Nacra 17 event.
