= Jin Ye (sailor) =

Chinese sailor

Personal information
- Nationality: Chinese
- Born: 20 October 1999 (age 25)

Sport
- Sport: Sailing

Jin Ye (Chinese: 金晔, born 20 October 1999) is a Chinese sailor. She competed in the 49er FX event at the 2020 Summer Olympics.
