= Rose-Lee Numa =

Papua New Guinean sailor

Personal information
- Nationality: Papua New Guinean
- Born: 1 May 1997 (age 27)

Sport
- Sport: Sailing

Rose-Lee Numa (born 1 May 1997) is a Papua New Guinean sailor. She competed at the 2011 Pacific Games, 2015 Pacific Games, winning a silver medal, and 2019 Pacific Games. She qualified at the 2020 Oceania Championship. She also competed in the Laser Radial event at the 2020 Summer Olympics.
