= Martine Steller Mortensen =

Norwegian sailor

Personal information
- Nationality: Norwegian
- Born: 11 November 1994 (age 31) Kristiansand, Norway
- Height: 1.71 m (5 ft 7 in)

Sport

Sailing career
- Class(es): Nacra 17, Europe
- Club: Royal Norwegian Yacht Club

Martine Steller Mortensen (born 11 November 1994) is a Norwegian competitive sailor, born in Kristiansand. She qualified to represent Norway at the 2020 Summer Olympics in Tokyo 2021, competing in Nacra 17.
