= William Phillips (sailor) =

Australian sailor

Personal information
- Nationality: Australian
- Born: 9 October 1987 (age 37); Sorrento, Victoria, Australia

Sport
- Sport: Sailing

William Phillips (born 9 October 1987) is an Australian sailor. Phillips competed in the 49er event at the 2020 Summer Olympics. He and his brother, Sam, managed a rank of twelfth and therefore were not in medal contention.
