= Nikki Barnes =

American sailor

Personal information
- Full name: Nikole Barnes
- Nationality: American
- Born: September 20, 1993 (age 32) Saint Thomas, U.S. Virgin Islands
- Height: 5 ft 2 in (157 cm)

Sport
- Country: United States
- Sport: Sailing

Nikole "Nikki" Barnes (born September 20, 1993) is an American sailor. She competed at the 2020 Summer Olympics, held July–August 2021 in Tokyo, in the Women's Two Person Dinghy - 470 event.

== Personal life ==
Barnes was born in Saint Thomas, U.S. Virgin Islands and started sailing when she was six years old. She is a 2017 graduate of the United States Coast Guard Academy and is now an active-duty member, currently a lieutenant attached to Sector Miami. She is the first member of the Coast Guard to ever compete in the Olympic games.

== Career highlights ==
- 3rd at the 2011 ISAF Youth Sailing World Championships in the i420
- Quantum Women's Sailor of the Year award
- 2017 Sportsman of the Year award
- 3 All-American honors three times
