= Endre Funnemark =

Norwegian windsurfer

Personal information
- Nationality: Norwegian
- Born: 25 February 1998 (age 28) Oslo, Norway

Sport

Sailing career
- Club: Royal Norwegian Yacht Club

Endre Funnemark (born 25 February 1998) is a Norwegian competitive sailor,

== Life and career ==
Born in Oslo on 25 February 1998, Funnemark qualified to represent Norway at the 2020 Summer Olympics in Tokyo 2021. He competed in RS:X, where he placed 14th.

Funnemark is affiliated with the Royal Norwegian Yacht Club.
