= Linda Fahrni =

Swiss sailor

Personal information
- Nationality: Swiss
- Born: 25 May 1993 (age 31); Münsingen, Switzerland
- Height: 157 cm (5 ft 2 in)
- Weight: 56 kg (123 lb)

Sailing career
- Class(es): 420, 470
- Club: Thunersee Yacht Club

Linda Fahrni (born 25 May 1993) is a Swiss competitive sailor. She competed for Switzerland at the 2016 Summer Olympics in Rio de Janeiro, in the women's 470 class, and at the 2020 Summer Olympics in Tokyo, also in the women's 470 class.
