= Lourdes Hartkopf =

Argentine sailor

Personal information
- Born: 10 January 1996 (age 30) Posadas, Argentina

Sport

Sailing career
- Class(es): 470, ILCA 4, ILCA 6
- Club: Yacht Club Argentino

Lourdes Hartkopf (born 10 January 1996) is an Argentine sailor. She competed in the women's 470 event at the 2020 Summer Olympics.
