= Svenja Weger =

German sailor

Personal information
- Nationality: German
- Born: 4 September 1993 (age 32) Heidelberg, Germany
- Height: 1.73 m (5 ft 8 in)

Sailing career
- Sport: Sailing
- Class(es): ILCA 6, 420, 470

Svenja Weger (born 4 September 1993) is a German competitive sailor. Her achievements include placing 11th overall in the 2017 Laser Radial World Championships. She competed in the Laser Radial event at the 2020 Summer Olympics, held July–August 2021 in Tokyo.
