= Cecilia Jonsson =

Swedish sailor

Personal information
- Nationality: Swedish
- Born: 30 November 1990 (age 35)

Sport
- Country: Sweden
- Sport: Sailing
- Club: Royal Swedish Yacht Club

Cecilia Jonsson (born 30 November 1990) is a Swedish sailor. She qualified to represent Sweden in the 2020 Tokyo Summer Olympics alongside Emil Järudd, competing at the Mixed Multihull - Nacra 17 Foiling event, where she ranked 14th.
