= Chen He (sailor) =

Chinese sailor (born 1989)

Personal information
- Nationality: Chinese
- Born: 28 July 1989 (age 35); Shandong, China

Sailing career
- Class: Finn

Chen He (Chinese: 陈贺, born 28 July 1989) is a Chinese sailor. He competed in the Finn event at the 2020 Summer Olympics.
