= Aly Badawy =

Egyptian sailor (born 2001)

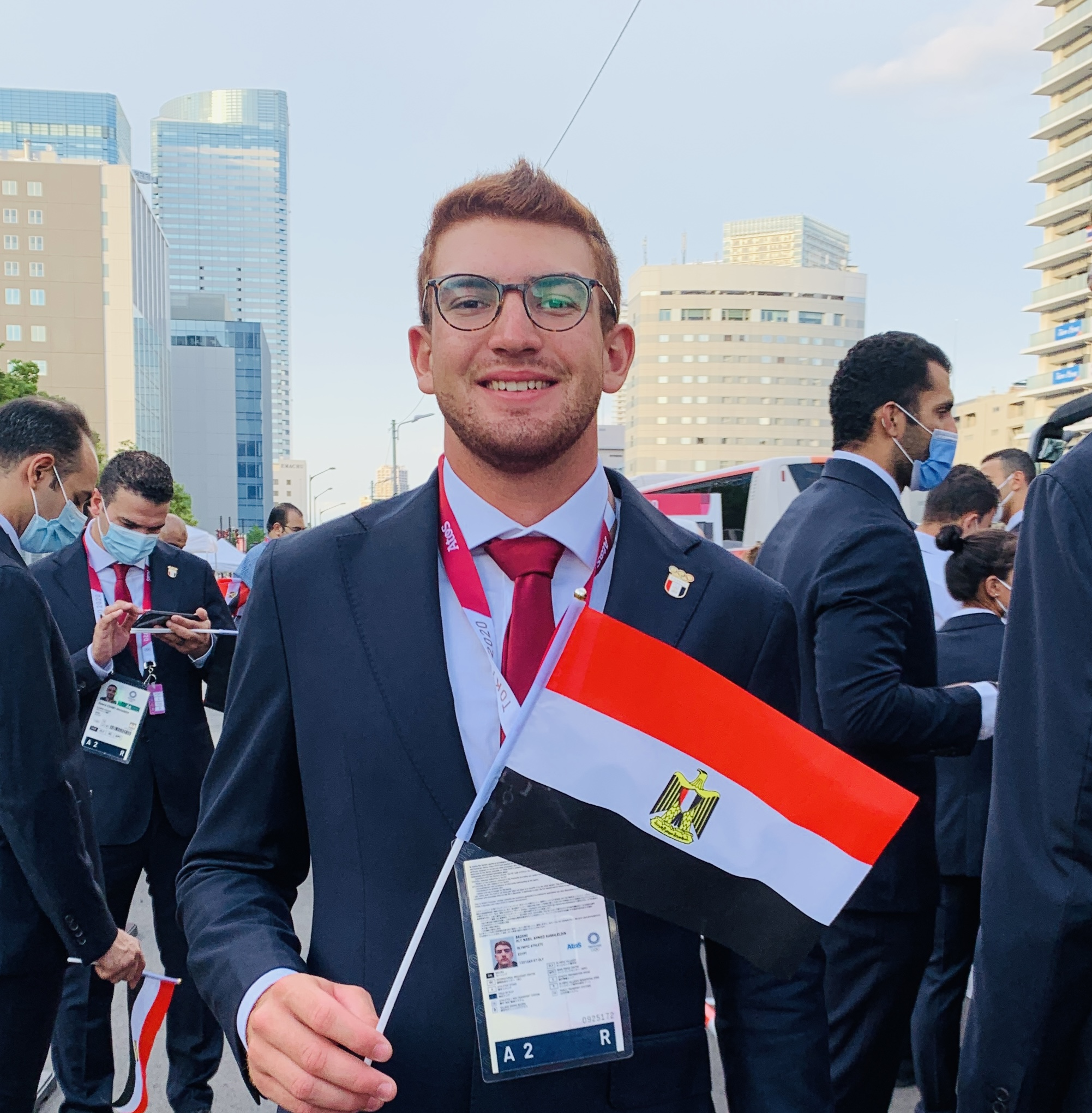
- Badawy in 2021

Personal information
- Nationality: Egyptian
- Born: 1 January 2001 (age 24); Alexandria, Egypt

Sport
- Sport: Sailing

Aly Badawy (born 1 January 2001) is an Egyptian sailor. He competed in the Laser event at both the 2020 and the 2024 Summer Olympics.
