= Ekaterina Zyuzina =

Russian sailor

Personal information
- Full name: Ekaterina Aleksandrovna Zyuzina
- Nationality: Russian
- Born: 8 December 1996 (age 28); Lipetsk, Russia

Sailing career
- Class: ILCA 6

Ekaterina Aleksandrovna Zyuzina (Russian: Екатерина Александровна Зюзина, born 8 December 1996) is a Russian sailor. She competed in the Laser Radial event at the 2020 Summer Olympics.
