= Benjamin Daniel =

South African sailor

Personal information
- Full name: Benjamin Talbot Daniel
- Nationality: South Africa
- Born: 18 November 2000 (age 24)

Sport
- Sport: Sailing

Benjamin Talbot Daniel (born 18 November 2000) is a South African sailor. He competed in the 2020 Summer Olympics.
