= Juan Ignacio Pérez (sailor) =

Mexican sailor (born 1996)

Juan Pérez
Personal information
- Full name: Juan Ignacio Pérez Soltero
- Born: 8 March 1996 (age 30) Guadalajara, Mexico
- Height: 1.85 m (6 ft 1 in)

Sailing career
- Sport: Sailing
- Class(es): ILCA 7, Finn

Juan Ignacio Pérez Soltero (Note: In this Spanish name, the first or paternal surname is Pérez and the second or maternal family name is Soltero.) (born 8 March 1996) is a Mexican sailor. He competed in the Finn event at the 2020 Summer Olympics, finishing in 17th place.
