= Aleksandr Askerov =

Russian windsurfer

Personal information
- Native name: Александр Сергеевич Аскеров
- Full name: Aleksandr Sergeyevich Askerov
- Nationality: Russian
- Born: 26 July 1995 (age 29)

Sailing career
- Class: RS:X

Aleksandr Sergeyevich Askerov (Russian: Александр Сергеевич Аскеров, born 26 July 1995) is a Russian windsurfer. He competed in the 2020 Summer Olympics in the Men's RS:X event.
