= Denise Parruque =

Mozambican sailor

Personal information
- Nationality: Mozambican
- Born: 5 February 2003 (age 22)

Sport
- Sport: Sailing

Denise Parruque (born 5 February 2003) is a Mozambican sailor. She competed in the women's 470 event at the 2020 Summer Olympics.
