= Nadjet Berrichi =

Algerian windsurfer

Personal information
- Full name: Amina Nadjet Berrichi
- Nationality: Algerian
- Born: 16 May 1995 (age 29); Oran, Algeria

Sailing career
- Class: RS:X
- Club: Amal Riadhi Baladiet El-Marsa
- Coach: Bouhadjira Manar

Amina Nadjet Berrichi (born 16 May 1995) is an Algerian competitive sailor. She is also known as Nadjet Amina Berrichi, Amina Berrichi, or Nadjet Berrichi. She placed 27th in the Women's RS:X event at the 2020 Summer Olympics and 13th in the IQFoil event competing for Algeria at the 2022 Mediterranean Games.
