= Andrés Lage =

Venezuelan sailor

Personal information
- Full name: Andrés Lage de Armas
- Born: 27 November 1991 (age 33); Valencia, Venezuela

Sport
- Sport: Sailing

Andrés Lage de Armas (born 27 November 1991) is a Venezuelan sailor. He competed in the Finn event at the 2020 Summer Olympics.
