= Yang Xuezhe =

Chinese sailor

Personal information
- Nationality: Chinese
- Born: 1 November 1997 (age 27)

Sport
- Sport: Sailing

Yang Xuezhe (born 1 November 1997) is a Chinese sailor. He competed in the Nacra 17 event at the 2020 Summer Olympics.
