= Anne-Marie Rindom =

Danish sailor (born 1991)

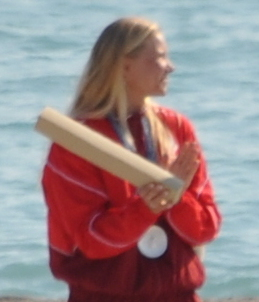
- Rindom at the 2024 Summer Olympics

Personal information
- Nationality: Danish
- Born: 14 June 1991 (age 35) Søllerød, Denmark

Sailing career
- Sport: Sailing
- Class: Laser Radial
Competition record
Representing Denmark
Olympic Games
Gold medal – first place	2020 Tokyo	Laser Radial
Silver medal – second place	2024 Paris	Laser Radial
Bronze medal – third place	2016 Rio de Janeiro	Laser Radial
World Championships in Sailing
Europe World Championships
Gold medal – first place	2009 Brest	Europe
Silver medal – second place	2008 Santo Antonio	Europe
Women's ILCA 6 World Championship
Gold medal – first place	2024 Mar del Plata	ILCA 6
Gold medal – first place	2022 Kemah	Laser Radial
Gold medal – first place	2019	Laser Radial
Gold medal – first place	2015 Al Mussanah	Laser Radial
Bronze medal – third place	2023 The Hague	ILCA 6
Bronze medal – third place	2018 Aarhus	Laser Radial
Bronze medal – third place	2016 Nuevo Vallarta	Laser Radial
Youth Sailing World Championships
Silver medal – second place	2009	Laser Radial

Anne-Marie Rindom (born 14 June 1991 in Søllerød) is a Danish olympic gold medalist and multiple world champion in sailing.

== Sailing Career ==
=== Olympics ===
She competed in the following games:

- 13th at the 2012 Summer Olympics in the Laser Radial class.
- (bronze) st the 2016 Summer Olympics in the Laser Radial event.
- (gold) at the 2020 Summer Olympics, in Laser Radial.
- (silver) at the 2024 Summer Olympics in the Laser Radial event.

=== World Championships ===
She won the 2015 Women's Laser Radial World Championship.

=== Other Events ===
In 2021, Rindom confirmed that she had joined the Denmark SailGP Team presented by Rockwool to compete in Season 2 of SailGP.
