= Lorena Abicht =

Austrian sailor

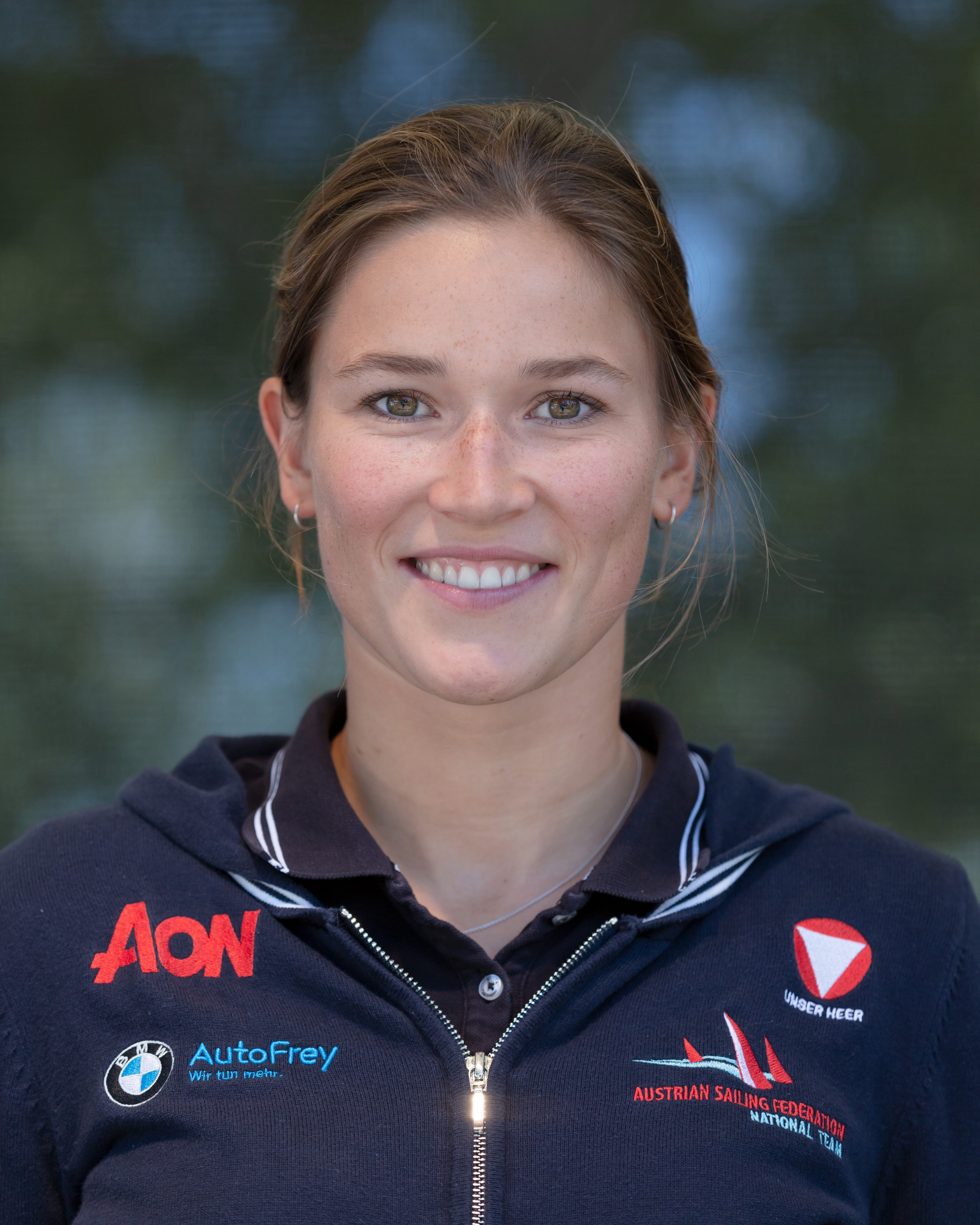
- Abicht in 2019

Personal information
- Nationality: Austrian
- Born: 12 July 1994 (age 31) Hamburg, Germany

Sailing career
- Sport: Sailing
- Class(es): 49erFX, IQFOiL, 470
Medal record
Sailing
Representing Austria
World Championships
Silver medal – second place	2018 Aarhus	49er FX

Lorena Abicht (born 12 July 1994) is an Austrian sailor. She competed in the 49er FX event at the 2020 Summer Olympics, finishing 17th.
