= Kenji Nanri =

Japanese sailor

Personal information
- Nationality: Japanese
- Born: 8 June 1992 (age 33) Saga, Japan

Sport

Sailing career
- Class(es): ILCA 7, ILCA 6

Kenji Nanri (Japanese: 南里研二, Nanri Kenji, born 8 June 1992) is a Japanese sailor. He competed in the Laser event at the 2020 Summer Olympics.
