= Barbara Matz =

Austrian sailor

Personal information
- Nationality: Austrian
- Born: 16 January 1998 (age 27)

Sport
- Sport: Sailing

Barbara Matz (born 16 January 1998) is an Austrian sailor. She competed in the Nacra 17 event, partnering with Thomas Zajac, at the 2020 Summer Olympics.
