= Maria Machava =

Mozambican sailor

Personal information
- Nationality: Mozambican
- Born: 17 August 2004 (age 20)
- Height: 1.27 m (4 ft 1 in)

Sailing career
- Class: 470

Maria Machava (born 17 August 2004) is a Mozambican sailor. She competed in the women's 470 event at the 2020 Summer Olympics.
