= Kevin Peponnet =

French sailor

Kevin Peponnet (born 31 January 1991 in Saint-Jean-de-Luz) is a French sailor. He is competing at the 2020 Summer Olympics in the 470 class together with Jeremie Mion. In 2018 they won the Sailing World Championships.
