= Cristina Pujol (sailor) =

Spanish sailor

Personal information
- Full name: Cristina Pujol Bajo
- Nationality: Spanish
- Born: 5 May 1993 (age 32) Sant Cugat del Vallès, Spain

Sport

Sailing career
- Class(es): 470, ILCA 6
- Club: Club Nautic Port d'Aro

Cristina Pujol Bajo (Note: In this Spanish name, the first or paternal surname is Pujol and the second or maternal family name is Bajo.) (born 5 May 1993) is a Spanish competitive sailor.

She competed in the laser radial event at the 2020 Summer Olympics, held July–August 2021 in Tokyo.
