= Ignacio Berenguer =

Mexican windsurfer (born 1995)

Personal information
- Full name: Ignacio Berenguer Lleonart
- Born: 9 August 1995 (age 30) Cancún, Mexico
- Height: 1.78 m (5 ft 10 in)

Sport

Sailing career
- Class(es): RS:X, Techno 293, IQFOiL

Ignacio Berenguer Lleonart (Note: In this Spanish name, the first or paternal surname is Berenguer and the second or maternal family name is Lleonart.) (born 9 August 1995) is a Mexican windsurfer. He competed in the 2020 Summer Olympics in the Men's RS:X event.
