= Khouloud Mansy =

Egyptian sailor

Personal information
- Nationality: Egyptian
- Born: 22 July 1998 (age 26)

Sport
- Sport: Sailing

Khouloud Mansy (born 22 July 1998) is an Egyptian sailor. She competed in the Laser Radial event at the 2020 Summer Olympics.
