= Sean Waddilove =

Irish sailor

Personal information
- Nationality: Irish
- Born: 19 June 1997 (age 29) Camberley, England

Sport
- Sport: Sailing

Sean Waddilove (born 19 June 1997) is an Irish sailor. He competed in the 49er event at the 2020 Summer Olympics.
