= Noya Bar Am =

Israeli sailor

Personal information
- Native name: נויה בר עם
- Nationality: Israeli
- Born: 1 September 1996 (age 29)

Sport
- Country: Israel
- Sport: Sailing

Noya Bar Am (or Baram; Hebrew: נויה בר עם; born 1 September 1996) is an Israeli sailor.

== 2020 Tokyo Olympics ==
Baram represented Israel in the 2020 Tokyo Olympics alongside Shahar Tibi, competing in the Women's Two Person Dinghy events.
