= Deizy Nhaquile =

Mozambican sailor

Personal information
- Nationality: Mozambican
- Born: 30 July 2000 (age 24)

Sport
- Sport: Sailing

Deizy Nhaquile (born 30 July 2000) is a Mozambican sailor. She competed in the Laser Radial event at the 2020 Summer Olympics.
