= Leo Davis =

South African sailor

Personal information
- Full name: Leo Victor Davis
- Nationality: South African
- Born: 11 March 1992 (age 34) Cape Town, South Africa

Sailing career
- Sport: Sailing
- Class(es): Finn, ILCA 4

Leo Davis (born 11 March 1992) is a South African sailor. He competed in the Finn event at the 2020 Summer Olympics.
