= Benjamin Vadnai =

Hungarian sailor (born 1995)

Personal information
- Born: 30 December 1995 (age 30) Veszprém, Hungary

Sport
- Country: Hungary
- Sport: Sailing
- Event: Laser

Benjamin Vadnai (born 30 December 1995) is a Hungarian competitive sailor. He competed at the 2016 Summer Olympics in Rio de Janeiro, in the men's Laser class.
