= Olivia Bergström =

Swedish sailor

Personal information
- Nationality: Swedish
- Born: 24 April 1996 (age 28)

Sport
- Sport: Sailing

Olivia Bergström (born 24 April 1996) is a Swedish sailor. She competed in the women's 470 event at the 2020 Summer Olympics.
