= Facundo Olezza =

Argentine sailor

Facundo Mario Olezza Bazán (Note: In this Spanish name, the first or paternal surname is Olezza and the second or maternal family name is Bazán.) (born 30 August 1994 in San Isidro) is an Argentine sailor. He placed ninth in the Finn event at the 2016 Summer Olympics. He competed at the 2020 Summer Olympics where he came sixth.
