= Jake Lilley =

Australian competitive sailor (born 1993)

Personal information
- Born: 20 July 1993 (age 32)

Sport
- Country: Australia
- Sport: Sailing

Jake Lilley (born 20 July 1993) is an Australian competitive sailor. He competed at the 2016 Summer Olympics in Rio de Janeiro, in the men's Finn class. He came eighth overall and participated in the medal race.

In December 2019 Jake Lilley achieved 5th in the Finn Gold Cup (World Championships) at Royal Brighton Yacht Club in Melbourne and qualified Australia's entry position for the Finn class to compete in 2020 Tokyo Summer Olympics. Lilley came seventh in the men's Finn class and therefore was not in medal contention. Detailed result.
