= Marilena Makri =

Cypriot sailor (born 2002)

Personal information
- Nationality: Cypriot
- Born: 18 November 2002 (age 23) Limassol, Cyprus
- Height: 1.76 m (5 ft 9 in)

Sailing career
- Sport: Sailing
- Classes: Laser Radial (ILCA 6); Laser 4.7 (ILCA 4)
Medal record
Sailing
Representing Cyprus
U-21 World Championships
Bronze medal – third place	2021	ILCA 6 Women

Marilena Makri (Greek: Μαριλένα Μακρή, born 18 November 2002) is a Cypriot sailor. She competed in the Laser Radial event at the 2020 Summer Olympics.
