= Dominique Knüppel =

Uruguayan sailor (born 1993)

Dominique Knüppel Artagaveytia (Note: In this Spanish name, the first or paternal surname is Knüppel and the second or maternal family name is Artagaveytia.) (born 11 July 1993) is a Uruguayan sailor.

She represented Uruguay at the 2020 Summer Olympics, ranking 18th in the mixed Nacra 17 event alongside Pablo Defazio Abella. Her father Bernd competed in the 1984 Los Angeles Summer Olympics and at the 1988 Summer Olympics in Seoul.
