= Lucía Falasca =

Argentine sailor

Personal information
- Born: 8 July 1993 (age 32) Buenos Aires, Argentina
- Height: 171 cm (5 ft 7 in)
- Weight: 64 kg (141 lb)

Sailing career
- Sport: Sailing
- Club: Yacht Club Argentino
- Class: ILCA 6
Medal record
Women's sailing
Representing Argentina
Pan American Games
Bronze medal – third place	2019 Lima	Laser Radial

Lucía Falasca (born 8 July 1993) is an Argentine competitive sailor.

She competed at the 2016 Summer Olympics in Rio de Janeiro, in the women's Laser Radial. She finished in 11th place.

She qualified to represent Argentina at the 2020 Summer Olympics.
