= Low-point system =

Low-point system is a point system in the Racing Rules of Sailing where all the boats in each race of the series score the same number of points as they finish in the race, so that the first boat to cross the finish line gets one point, the second two points. Boats that don't start, finish, retires or are disqualified are scored one more point than the total entrants of the series. For example, in a series with nine entrants, a disqualified boat scores 10 points in the race it is disqualified in. The low-point scoring system is usually used to score individual events with a fixed number of entrants. For season long series of events where the numbers of participants varies from race to race alternative scoring systems are in use.
