= Nacra 17 European Championship =

Nacra 17 European Championship is an annual European Championship sailing regatta in the Nacra 17 class organised by the Nacra 17 Class.

== Editions ==
Year	City	Country	Dates	Athletes	Nations	Notes
2013	Dervio	Italy	18–24 August			
2014	La Grande-Motte	France	4–12 July			
2015	Barcelona	Spain	26 September – 3 October			
2016	Thessaloniki	Greece	16–24 September			Event cancelled due to lack of participants
2017	Kiel	Germany	30 July – 4 August	50		
2018	Gdynia	Poland	8–13 July			
2019	Weymouth	United Kingdom	13–19 May	110		
2020	Lake Attersee	Austria	29 September – 4 October	60	16	
2021	Thessaloniki	Greece	14–19 September	30	11	
2022	Aarhus	Denmark	5–10 July	66	18	
2023	Vilamoura	Portugal	8–13 November	76	19	
2024	Palermo	Italy	6–10 November	36	13	
2025	Thessaloniki	Greece	3–8 June	54	16	
2026	Eckernförde	Germany	7–12 July	70	20	

== Medalists ==
Year	Gold	Silver	Bronze
2013 Dervio	Netherlands; Mandy Mulder; Coen de Koning		
2014 La Grande Motte	Spain; Iker Martínez; Tara Pacheco		
2015 Barcelona	Great Britain; Ben Saxton; Nicola Groves		
2017 Kiel	Italy; Ruggero Tita; Caterina Banti	Spain; Fernando Echávarri; Tara Pacheco	Great Britain; Ben Saxton; Katie Dabson
2018 Gdynia	Italy; Ruggero Tita; Caterina Banti	Spain; Fernando Echávarri; Tara Pacheco	Denmark; CP Lübeck; Lin Cenholt
2019 Weymouth	Great Britain; Ben Saxton; Nicola Boniface	Great Britain; John Gimson; Anna Burnet	Denmark; CP Lübeck; Lin Cenholt
2020 Lake Attersee	Italy; Ruggero Tita; Caterina Banti	France; Quentin Delapierre; Manon Audinet	Italy; Vittorio Bissaro; Maelle Frascari
2021 Thessaloniki	Great Britain; John Gimson; Anna Burnet	Italy; Gianluigi Ugolini; Alice Cialfi	France; Titouan Pétard; Lou Berthomieu
2022 Aarhus	Italy; Ruggero Tita; Caterina Banti	Finland; Sinem Kurtbay; Akseli Keskinen	Italy; Gianluigi Ugolini; Maria Giubilei
2023 Vilamoura	Great Britain; John Gimson; Anna Burnet	Italy; Ruggero Tita; Caterina Banti	Italy; Gianluigi Ugolini; Maria Giubilei
2024 Palermo	Netherlands; Willemijn Offerman; Scipio Houtman	Italy; Gianluigi Ugolini; Maria Giubilei	Belgium; Kwinten Borghijs; Lieselotte Borghijs
2025 Thessaloniki	Great Britain; John Gimson; Anna Burnet	Italy; Gianluigi Ugolini; Maria Giubilei	France; Tim Mourniac; Aloïse Retornaz
2026 Eckernförde	Sweden; Emil Järudd; Hanna Jonsson	Great Britain; John Gimson; Anna Burnet	Netherlands; Willemijn Offerman; Scipio Houtman
