= Nacra 17 World Championship =

Mixed Nacra 17 World Championship is an annual World Championship sailing regatta in the Nacra 17 class organised by the host club on behalf of the International Class Association and recognised by World Sailing. The class is the second class to have a compulsory mixed gender requirement following the SKUD 18 Paralympic discipline.

== Editions ==
Host cities of the Nacra 17 World Championship

Event			Host			Sailors			Boat			Ref.
Ed.	Dates	Year	Host club	Location	Country	Ath.	Nat.	Cont.	Tot.	M/F	F/M	Ref.
1	20-28 Jul	2013		The Hague	Netherlands	130	23	5	65	40	25	
2	12-21 Sep	2014		Santander, Spain	Spain	136	31	5	68	40	28	
3	3-11 Jul	2015		Aarhus	Denmark	62	20	5	31	19	12	
4	9-14 Feb	2016	Clearwater Community Sailing Centre	Clearwater, Florida	United States	86	22	5	43	31	12	
5	2-10 Sep	2017	Yacht Club de La Grande Motte	La Grande Motte	France	94	23	5	47	38	9	
6	30Jul -12Aug	2018		Aarhus	Denmark	136	27	5	68	47	21	
7	3-8 Dec	2019	Royal Akarana Yacht Club	Auckland	New Zealand	104	23	5	52	37	15	
8	10-15 Feb	2020	Royal Geelong Yacht Club	Geelong	Australia	68	16	5	34	22	12	
9	16-21 Nov	2021		Wudam Al Sahil	Oman	30	12	4	15	10	5	
10	31 Aug-5 Sept	2022		St. Margarets Bay, Nova Scotia	Canada	68	16	5	34	24	10	
11	11-17 Aug	2023		The Hague	Netherlands	98	23	5	49	38	11	
12	7-12 May	2024		La Grande-Motte	France	88	20	5	44	33	11	
13	7–12 October	2025	Italian Sailing Federation	Poetto Beach, Cagliari	Italy	80	18	3	40	32	8	
14	12–17 May	2026	Comité Départemental de Voile du Morbihan	Saint-Pierre-Quiberon	France	70	20	4	35	29	6	

== Medalists ==
Games	Gold	Silver	Bronze
2013 The Hague	France; Billy Besson; Marie Riou	Great Britain; Ben Saxton; Hannah Diamond	Switzerland; Matías Bühler; Nathalie Brugger
2014 Santander	France; Billy Besson; Marie Riou	Argentina; Santiago Lange; Cecilia Carranza	Australia; Jason Waterhouse; Lisa Darmanin
2015 Aarhus	France; Billy Besson; Marie Riou	Australia; Jason Waterhouse; Lisa Darmanin	Netherlands; Mandy Mulder; Coen de Koning
2016 Clearwater	France; Billy Besson; Marie Riou	Denmark; Allan Nørregaard; Anette Viborg Andreasen	Italy; Vittorio Bissaro; Silvia Sicouri
2017 La Grande-Motte	Great Britain; Ben Saxton; Katie Dabson	Spain; Fernando Echávarri; Tara Pacheco	Italy; Ruggero Tita; Caterina Banti
2018 Aarhus	Italy; Ruggero Tita; Caterina Banti	Australia; Nathan Outteridge; Haylee Outteridge	Argentina; Santiago Lange; Cecilia Carranza
2019 Auckland	Italy; Vittorio Bissaro; Maelle Frascari	Denmark; Lin Cenholt; CP Lübeck	Australia; Jason Waterhouse; Lisa Darmanin
2020 Geelong	Great Britain; John Gimson; Anna Burnet	Australia; Nathan Outteridge; Haylee Outteridge	Australia; Jason Waterhouse; Lisa Darmanin
2021 Wudam Al Sahil	Great Britain; John Gimson; Anna Burnet	Italy; Gianluigi Ugolini; Maria Giubilei	Germany; Paul Kohlhoff; Alica Stuhlemmer
2022 St. Margarets Bay	Italy; Ruggero Tita; Caterina Banti	Italy; Gianluigi Ugolini; Maria Giubilei	Finland; Sinem Kurtbay; Akseli Keskinen
2023 The Hague	Italy; Ruggero Tita; Caterina Banti	Great Britain; John Gimson; Anna Burnet	Sweden; Emil Järudd; Hanna Jonsson
2024 La Grande-Motte	Italy; Ruggero Tita; Caterina Banti	Great Britain; John Gimson; Anna Burnet	Italy; Gianluigi Ugolini; Maria Giubilei
2025 Cagliari	Great Britain; John Gimson; Anna Burnet	Italy; Gianluigi Ugolini; Maria Giubilei	Netherlands; Willemijn Offerman; Scipio Houtman
2026 Quiberon	Italy; Gianluigi Ugolini; Maria Giubilei	France; Tim Mourniac; Aloïse Retornaz	Great Britain; John Gimson; Anna Burnet

== All-time medal table ==
Updated post the 2026 Worlds

Rank	Nation	Gold	Silver	Bronze	Total
1	Italy (ITA)	6	3	3	12
2	Great Britain (GBR)	4	3	1	8
3	France (FRA)	4	1	0	5
4	Australia (AUS)	0	3	3	6
5	Denmark (DEN)	0	2	0	2
6	Argentina (ARG)	0	1	1	2
7	Spain (ESP)	0	1	0	1
8	Netherlands (NED)	0	0	2	2
9	Finland (FIN)	0	0	1	1
9	Germany (GER)	0	0	1	1
9	Sweden (SWE)	0	0	1	1
9	Switzerland (SUI)	0	0	1	1
Totals (12 entries)		14	14	14	42
