= 2017 Nacra 17 World Championship =

Event title
- Edition: 5th

Event details
- Venue: La Grande-Motte, France
- Dates: 5–10 September
- Titles: 1

Competitors
- Competitors: 94
- Competing nations: 23

Results
- (gold) Gold: (United Kingdom) Saxton & Dabson
- (silver) Silver: (Spain) Echavarri & Pacheco
- (bronze) Bronze: (Italy) Tita & Banti

The 2017 Nacra 17 World Championship was held in La Grande-Motte, France, 5–10 September 2017. It was won by the British crew of Katie Dabson and Ben Saxton.

== Results ==
As of end of regatta

Results of individual races
Pos	Crew	Country	I	II	III	IV	V	VI	VII	VIII	IX	X	XI	XII	XIII	XIV	XV	XVI	XVII	MR	Tot	Pts
Gold medal	Ben Saxton; Katie Dabson	Great Britain	6	4	2	6	5	2	10	1	5	4	UFD	12	2	2	16	10	11	2	127	92
Silver medal	Fernando Echavarri; Tara Pacheco	Spain	5	2	7	13	6	4	11	7	BFD	5	2	3	1	19	5	6	12	3	139	95
Bronze medal	Ruggero Tita; Caterina Banti	Italy	12	2	10	6	1	2	3	18	10	15	1	1	12	7	18	3	2	DNF	145	109
4	Gemma Jones; Jason Saunders	New Zealand	3	5	4	14	3	7	5	11	2	2	8	24	24	14	7	1	1	7	149	111
5	Paul Kohlhoff; Alica Stuhlemmer	Germany	8	15	8	8	2	1	15	15	3	12	11	2	8	13	9	5	6	1	143	115
6	John Gimson; Anna Burnet	Great Britain	3	4	2	14	6	7	7	13	8	11	12	19	3	4	1	13	13	4	148	115
7	Moana Vaireaux; Manon Audinet	France	6	5	7	4	3	3	9	6	10	10	3	18	5	15	17	2	14	6	149	121
8	Lin Ea Cenholt Christiansen; Christian Peter Lübeck	Denmark	12	1	1	3	4	4	19	2	2	16	13	13	17	12	12	4	7	8	158	122
9	Iker Martínez de Lizarduy; Olga Maslivets	Spain	1	11	9	4	7	1	4	1	11	14	5	9	10	8	21	7	15	DNF	160	128
10	Olivia Mackay; Micah Wilkinson	New Zealand	7	11	16	2	14	10	8	2	6	UFD	10	5	6	3	4	9	22	5	170	129
11	Jason Waterhouse; Lisa Darmanin	Australia	4	9	12	5	1	5	13	4	7	17	6	10	9	22	10	8	16		158	123
12	Vittorio Bissaro; Maelle Frascari	Italy	15	12	17	1	2	3	1	8	15	1	7	15	21	11	14	21	5		169	131
13	Santiago Lange; Cecilia Carranza	Argentina	9	7	3	1	8	6	12	10	1	20	UFD	17	11	5	3	BFD	8		171	134
14	Mateo Majdalani; Eugenia Bosco	Argentina	4	8	5	3	9	15	20	3	4	8	20	4	20	17	6	18	10		174	134
15	João Bulhões; Gabriela Nicolino	Brazil	11	3	9	7	10	12	5	12	5	7	18	16	18	6	2	14	UFD		180	143
16	Tom Phipps; Nicola Boniface	Great Britain	13	15	16	8	8	6	7	17	1	6	9	11	23	20	11	11	3		185	145
17	Pablo Defazio; Dominique Knüppel	Uruguay	5	3	5	5	14	17	3	9	3	19	16	7	13	9	23	17	19		187	147
18	Chris Rashley; Laura Marimon	Great Britain	2	12	14	12	11	8	2	3	7	18	17	8	14	16	8	20	9		181	147
19	Thomas Zajac; Barbara Matz	Austria	9	19	6	7	5	11	1	19	8	3	15	20	22	18	20	12	4		199	158
20	Riley Gibbs; Louisa Chafee	United States	DPI	DPI	DPI	UFD	12	8	2	10	12	13	4	14	15	1	19	16	20		211	166
21	Lorenzo Bressani; Cecilia Zorzi	Italy	1	6	17	13	15	12	6	15	17	21	19	6	7	10	15	15	17		212	174
22	Mathias Bruun; Anette Viborg Andreasen	Denmark	7	7	11	2	7	10	4	14	14	9	14	23	19	23	13	DNF	DNC		227	188
23	Cecilia Wollmann; Michael Wollmann	Bermuda	8	13	3	11	16	22	6	7	9	22	21	21	4	21	22	22	21		249	205
24	Julien Villion; Bérénice Delpuech	France	14	9	6	16	11	14	17	5	9	23	22	22	16	24	24	19	18		269	228
25	Rupert White; Kirstie Urwin	Great Britain	14	17	18	9	4	11	18	11	15	6	9	1	2	1	12	1	1		150	120
26	Tim Mourniac; Amélie Riou	France	10	17	13	9	10	UFD	24	5	16	5	2	4	13	9	1	5	4		172	134
27	Henri Demesmaeker; Anouk Geurts	Belgium	20	10	19	10	19	17	14	16	4	2	6	5	12	2	2	6	8		172	140
28	Sinem Kurtbay; Janne Jarvinen	Finland	10	6	13	20	17	13	DPI	12	11	7	4	11	8	6	9	2	DNF		187	143
29	Erica Edda Ratti; Porro Francesco	Italy	15	13	12	12	15	18	10	18	6	3	UFD	14	3	20	5	8	7		203	161
30	Jason Hess; Andrea Aldana	Guatemala	18	21	20	18	12	9	23	4	20	8	1	6	11	10	18	4	5		208	167
31	Javier Arribas Harten; Jarian Brandes	Peru	13	19	11	16	22	19	15	8	16	1	3	8	4	14	DNF	17	9		219	173
32	Justin Liu; Denise Lim	Singapore	11	8	15	15	20	20	20	21	13	11	8	7	5	7	3	13	UFD		221	176
33	Ida Svensson; Hugo Christensson	Sweden	22	21	8	11	9	5	11	9	19	9	10	UFD	15	17	7	UFD	2		223	177
34	Paul Darmanin; Lucy Copeland	Australia	16	16	10	21	17	14	19	19	17	12	7	9	6	4	4	15	DNF		230	185
35	Shibuki Iitsuka; Eri Hatayama	Japan	17	14	15	22	16	16	12	14	BFD	15	5	10	10	8	8	7	UFD		238	189
36	Sergey Dzhienbaev; Daria Ivanova	Russia	19	22	22	DNF	18	16	22	6	23	18	13	2	1	13	14	3	3		240	197
37	Kevin Bonnevie; Isaura Maenhaut	Belgium	16	10	14	10	DNF	DNS	16	13	19	4	18	UFD	7	3	6	DNC	DNC		258	209
38	Jess Diarcy; Owen Bowerman	Great Britain	23	18	19	15	19	18	8	21	18	10	17	13	17	12	15	9	UFD		276	229
39	Viatcheslav Sheludyakov; Kristina Sulima	Russia	22	20	21	19	20	UFD	14	16	13	17	16	12	20	15	11	11	6		278	233
40	Maksim Oberemko; Iana Stokolesova	Russia	19	18	18	19	23	24	17	17	21	16	15	16	16	5	13	16	DNF		297	249
41	Nicholas Fadler Martinsen; Martine Steller Mortensen	Norway	17	16	20	23	13	13	9	22	18	13	11	3	DNC	DNC	DNC	DNC	DNC		298	251
42	Silas Mühle; Romy Mackenbrock	Germany	20	DSQ	4	17	21	20	21	24	12	UFD	19	UFD	9	16	10	12	DNF		302	253
43	Thomas Tiffon; Morgane Macret	France	24	23	24	18	21	21	16	20	22	19	12	17	19	19	16	14	11		316	273
44	Antoine Tiffon; Eléonore Sellin	France	21	22	23	20	18	15	22	22	20	20	21	UFD	BFD	18	19	10	10		329	282
45	Emil Järudd; Cecilia Jonsson	Sweden	21	20	21	17	22	19	21	20	14	14	14	15	14	DNS	DNC	DNC	DNC		328	282
46	Marina Lopez; Joan Carles Tonisastre	Spain	23	23	22	DNC	DNF	23	18	23	24	UFD	20	18	18	11	17	18	DNF		356	307
47	Jan Hauke Erichsen; Luisa Krüger	Germany	18	14	23	21	13	9	DNF	DNF	DNF	DNS	DNS	DNC	DNC	DNC	DNC	DNC	DNC		365	316

Legend: – Qualified for medal race(s); BFD – Black flag disqualification; DNC – Did not come to the starting area; DNF – Did not finish; DSQ – Disqualified; RDG – Redress given; UFD – "U" flag disqualification;
