= 2014 ISAF Sailing World Championships – Nacra 17 =

Nacra 17 at the 2014 ISAF Sailing World Championships
- Venue: Santander, Spain
- Dates: 16–21 September
- Competitors: 136 from 31 nations

Medalists
gold medal	Billy Besson; Marie Riou	France
silver medal	Santiago Lange; Cecilia Carranza	Argentina
bronze medal	Jason Waterhouse; Lisa Darmanin	Australia

The mixed Nacra 17 class at the 2014 ISAF Sailing World Championships was held in Santander, Spain 16–21 September.

== Results ==
Results of individual races
Pos	Crew	Country	I	II	III	IV	V	VI	VII	VIII	IX	X	MR	Tot	Pts
Gold medal	Billy Besson; Marie Riou	France	1	1	2	1	2	1	1	12^{†}	7	5	6	39	27
Silver medal	Santiago Lange; Cecilia Carranza	Argentina	5	11	3	2	8	3	3	20	6	25^{†}	4	90	65
Bronze medal	Jason Waterhouse; Lisa Darmanin	Australia	6	9	7	9	6	10^{†}	10	1	2	6	10	76	66
4	Vittorio Bissaro; Silvia Sicouri	Italy	9	17	1	3	1	7	4	2	30^{†}	11	14	99	69
5	Gemma Jones; Jason Saunders	New Zealand	12	2	5	7	12	2	13	3	8	16^{†}	8	88	72
6	Matías Bühler; Nathalie Brugger	Switzerland	1	2	13	1	8	5	32^{†}	13	12	19	2	108	76
7	Lucy MacGregor; Andrew Walsh	Great Britain	17^{†}	3	10	13	3	11	16	7	1	2	12	95	78
8	Pippa Wilson; John Gimson	Great Britain	4	4	2	4	3	13	8	32^{†}	5	18	20	113	81
9	Darren Bundock; Nina Curtis	Australia	8	6	5	5	2	6	18^{†}	11	17	7	16	101	83
10	Moana Vaireaux; Manon Audinet	France	6	3	1	8	4	9	14	16	22^{†}	14	18	115	93
11	Allan Nørregaard; Line Just Emsvang	Denmark	12	8	11	11	1	17^{†}	11	10	3	13	–	97	80
12	Euan McNicol; Lucinda Whitty	Australia	21	13	4	10	16	4	6	8	33^{†}	3	–	118	85
13	Lorenzo Bressani; Giovanna Micol	Italy	3	8	16	11	4	14	17	23^{†}	10	4	–	110	87
14	Thomas Zajac; Tanja Frank	Austria	20	1	7	3	26^{†}	8	5	6	21	22	–	119	93
15	Federica Salvà; Francesco Bianchi	Italy	11	10	4	13	10	29^{†}	23	4	18	1	–	123	94
16	Audrey Ogereau; Matthieu Vandame	France	7	4	9	4	20	12	7	17	14	30^{†}	–	124	94
17	Pip Pietromonaco; James Wierzbowski	Australia	5	11	10	12	6	15	12	5	STP 20	27^{†}	–	123	96
18	Mandy Mulder; Coen de Koning	Netherlands	2	7	6	5	11	27	15	18	32^{†}	12	–	135	103
19	Ben Saxton; Hannah Diamond	Great Britain	2	16	8	2	9	DNF 35^{†}	RDG 21	RDG 21	13	15	–	142	107
20	Renee Groeneveld; Steven Krol	Netherlands	DNF 35^{†}	12	3	7	12	18	2	15	28	23	–	155	120
21	Flora Laugier; Valentin Bellet	France	3	5	9	18	5	23	21	21	34^{†}	24	–	163	129
22	Franck Cammas; Sophie de Turckheim	France	4	18	17	14	14	16	31^{†}	19	23	8	–	164	133
23	Tom Phipps; Mary Rook	Great Britain	22	10	14	8	18	28	9	14	STP 12	33^{†}	–	168	135
24	Nicole van der Velden; Thijs Visser	Aruba	10	5	11	6	7	DSQ 35^{†}	DNF 35	DNF 35	26	9	–	179	144
25	Enrique Figueroa; Franchesca Valdés Ortega	Puerto Rico	19	14	8	15	5	25^{†}	24	25	16	20	–	171	146
26	Francesco Porro; Caterina Banti	Italy	16	19	16	6	7	21	20	22	24^{†}	21	–	172	148
27	Rupert White; Nicola Boniface	Great Britain	14	7	6	15	19	19	26	27	20	32^{†}	–	185	153
28	Elke Delnooz; Jeroen van Leeuwen	Netherlands	15	9	12	23	15	24	22	24	31^{†}	17	–	192	161
29	Lin Ea Cenholt; Søren Kristensen	Denmark	7	18	DSQ 35^{†}	14	13	20	29	29	4	28	–	197	162
30	Sergey Dzhienbaev; Daria Ivanova	Russia	15	6	DNF 35^{†}	23	15	DSQ 35	25	30	9	10	–	203	168
31	Paul Kohlhoff; Carolina Werner	Germany	25	22	18	12	10	22	28	9	25	31^{†}	–	202	171
32	Anette Viborg; Martin Hjortlund Christensen	Denmark	13	23	14	16	11	30^{†}	19	26	29	26	–	207	177
33	Sofia Bekatorou; Konstantinos Trigkonis	Greece	14	15	13	18	UFD 35^{†}	26	27	28	15	29	–	220	185
34	Maksim Semenov; Alina Shchetinkina	Russia	9	13	25	9	16	31	30	31	27	34^{†}	–	225	191
35	Sarah Newberry; John Casey	United States	8	19	DNF 35^{†}	16	25	12	1	6	1	–	–	123	88
36	Luke Ramsay; Nikola Girke	Canada	11	20	20	32^{†}	19	3	4	1	11	–	–	121	89
37	Ida Svensson; Rasmus Rosengren	Sweden	28^{†}	16	15	19	13	2	3	20	3	–	–	119	91
38	Ingrid Petitjean; Olivier Backes	France	10	17	15	21^{†}	21	10	8	7	6	–	–	115	94
39	Pablo Defazio Abella; Mariana Foglia Costa	Uruguay	18	DNF 35^{†}	12	20	24	5	18	2	2	–	–	136	101
40	Stephanie Hudson; Ian Andrewes	United States	23	15	20	28^{†}	22	7	6	3	13	–	–	137	109
41	Jeremy Wilmot; Louisa Chafee	United States	27^{†}	25	21	21	9	4	24	4	4	–	–	139	112
42	Sarah Streater; Matthew Whitehead	United States	34^{†}	21	26	17	23	15	11	5	5	–	–	157	123
43	David Bondì; Alessandra Angelini	Italy	19	20	17	20	14	29^{†}	9	10	14.5	–	–	152.5	123.5
44	Samuel Albrecht; Geórgia Da Silva	Brazil	27	DNF 35^{†}	21	29	20	1	10	8	19	–	–	170	135
45	Finn Heeg; Merle Baars	Germany	24	30^{†}	27	26	27	9	7	14	7	–	–	171	141
46	Toni Rivas; Elisabet Llargués	Spain	23	12	19	28	17	UFD 35^{†}	2	9	RET 35	–	–	180	145
47	Robert Daniel; Catherine Shanahan	United States	25	21	23	10	DNF 35^{†}	19	19	19	10	–	–	181	146
48	Alicia Clifford; Tom Bruton	Great Britain	30^{†}	26	28	30	21	8	15	11	8	–	–	177	147
49	João Siemsen; Juliana Mota	Brazil	13	24	24	25	28	UFD 35^{†}	12	21	9	–	–	191	156
50	Yoana Petrova; Nikolay Tashev	Bulgaria	29^{†}	22	19	27	28	6	17	13	25	–	–	186	157
51	Anne-Line Lyngsø Thomsen; Mathias Borreskov	Denmark	DNF 35^{†}	25	22	31	23	17	22	17	12	–	–	204	169
52	Yamil Saba; Andrea Saba	Venezuela	20	23	25	24	30^{†}	22	26	12	20	–	–	202	172
53	Afonso Domingos; Diana Neves	Portugal	29^{†}	27	22	22	22	21	13	23	22	–	–	201	172
54	Marc Verdaguer Foz; Marina Lopez	Spain	26	24	24	30^{†}	24	14	25	22	14.5	–	–	203.5	173.5
55	Eckart Kaphengst; Tine-Marie Kaphengst	Germany	28	DNF 35^{†}	18	25	25	20	23	18	24	–	–	216	181
56	Hiroki Goto; Wakako Kajimoto	Japan	24	14	26	24	18	UFD 35^{†}	5	DNF 35	DNE 35	–	–	216	181
57	Morgan Good; Dominique Ampe	Belgium	18	DNF 35^{†}	DNF 35	19	29	18	UFD 35	16	16	–	–	221	186
58	Jakob Lenz; Susann Brechlin	Germany	22	DNF 35^{†}	DNF 35	22	27	13	16	UFD 35	18	–	–	223	188
59	Madeleine Anderson; Harry Willett	Great Britain	26	31^{†}	30	29	26	23	14	24	23	–	–	226	195
60	Alena Pankratova; Yury Artemiev	Russia	32^{†}	29	29	31	31	24	20	15	21	–	–	232	200
61	Flóra Virág; Balázs Gecse	Hungary	31	28	23	27	29	11	21	DNF 35^{†}	DNF 35	–	–	240	205
62	Nicholas Fadler Martinsen; Martine Steller Mortensen	Norway	17	DNF 35^{†}	DNF 35	17	30	UFD 35	28	DNF 35	17	–	–	249	214
63	Justin Liu; Denise Lim	Singapore	31	DNF 35^{†}	27	32	31	27	DNF 35	25	26	–	–	269	234
64	Blandine Medecin Rodelato; Jean Rodelato	Monaco	32	DNF 35^{†}	DNF 35	26	DNF 35	26	27	26	27	–	–	269	234
65	Ascensión Roca de Togores; Vernon Cerdán	Spain	30	DNF 35^{†}	DNF 35	33	17	16	DNF 35	DNF 35	DNF 35	–	–	271	236
66	Tat Choi Fung; Yu Ting Chan	Hong Kong	33	32	DNF 35^{†}	DNF 35	DNF 35	25	DNF 35	DNF 35	28	–	–	293	258
67	Katelyn Flood; Keenan Madewell	United States	21	DNF 35^{†}	DNF 35	DNF 35	DNF 35	28	DNF 35	DNF 35	DNF 35	–	–	294	259
68	Iker Martínez de Lizarduy; Tara Pacheco	Spain	16	DNF 35^{†}	DNF 35	DNF 35	DNF 35	DNF 35	DNF 35	DNF 35	DNF 35	–	–	296	261

Scoring system: low-point system; Source:
Legend: – Qualified for medal race(s); DNF – Did not finish; DSQ – Disqualified; RDG – Redress given; RET – Retired; UFD – "U" flag disqualification; † – Discarded race not counted in the overall result;
