= 2023 Sailing World Championships – Nacra 17 =

Nacra 17 at the 2023 Sailing World Championships
- Venue: The Hague, the Netherlands
- Dates: 11–17 August
- Competitors: 98 from 23 nations

Medalists
gold medal	Ruggero Tita; Caterina Banti	Italy
silver medal	John Gimson; Anna Burnet	Great Britain
bronze medal	Emil Järudd; Hanna Jonsson	Sweden

The Nacra 17 competition at the 2023 Sailing World Championships was the mixed multihull event and was held in The Hague, the Netherlands, 11–17 August 2023. The entries were limited to 70 boats. The competitors participated in an opening series that was planned to 15 races, followed by a medal race. The medal race was planned for 17 August.

The competition served as a qualifying event for the 2024 Olympic sailing competition with 9 out of 19 national quota being distributed at the event.

== Summary ==
Ruggero Tita and Caterina Banti of Italy were the reigning world champions, having won the 2022 Nacra 17 World Championship in Halifax, Nova Scotia, while Gianluigi Ugolini and Maria Giubilei of Italy had won the Paris 2024 Test Event the month before. In the Sailing World Cup, John Gimson and Anna Burnet of Great Britain had won the Trofeo Princesa Sofía and the Semaine Olympique Française, while Margherita Porro and Stefano Dezulian of Italy had won the Kiel Week.

Tita and Banti took the lead by winning all three races on the first day, on the same points as German duo Paul Kohlhoff and Alica Stuhlemmer, having won two in the other fleet. On the second day, Tita and Banti recorded three more race wins. Tita and Banti took ten out of 15 race wins in the opening series. In the medal race, they claimed their championship title by winning the medal race with a 300-metre distance to the next boat. Gimson and Burnett finished second, while Emil Järudd and Hanna Jonsson of Sweden took the bronze medal.

With the final results, national quotas were awarded Italy, Great Britain, Sweden, the Netherlands, Germany, New Zealand, Argentina, Finland, and Spain.

== Results ==
Results of individual races
Pos	Crew	Country	I	II	III	IV	V	VI	VII	VIII	IX	X	XI	XII	XIII	XIV	XV	MR	Tot	Pts
Gold medal	Ruggero Tita; Caterina Banti	Italy	1	1	1	2	1	1	1	1	1	9	12^{†}	5	1	1	3	2	43	31
Silver medal	John Gimson; Anna Burnet	Great Britain	3	2	2	3	3	1	3	5	5	1	20^{†}	4	3	6	4	12	77	57
Bronze medal	Emil Järudd; Hanna Jonsson	Sweden	2	7	3	4	6	4	6	1	17^{†}	2	7	1	7	5	7	4	83	66
4	Laila van der Meer; Bjarne Bouwer	Netherlands	10	2	2	1	4	3	7	3	2	15	1	DSQ 26^{†}	4	3	6	8	97	71
5	Vittorio Bissaro; Maellle Frascari	Italy	STP 2	4	6	8	UFD 26^{†}	4	7	2	6	6	5	9	2	4	1	10	102	76
6	Gianluigi Ugolini; Maria Giubilei	Italy	5	3	5	5	4	5	6	2	3	10	11^{†}	2	5	7	5	14	92	81
7	Paul Kohlhoff; Alica Stuhlemmer	Germany	STP 8	1	1	2	1	2	2	4	1	14	17^{†}	10	15	8	10	6	102	85
8	Micah Wilkinson; Erica Dawson	New Zealand	5	UFD 26^{†}	7	3	2	5	3	4	4	7	6	11	8	10	2	16	119	93
9	Mateo Majdalani; Eugenia Bosco	Argentina	4	3	3	5	3	2	1	10	4	3	19^{†}	12	6	9	8	20	112	93
10	Sinem Kurtbay; Akseli Keskinen	Finland	2	4	4	1	2	7	4	12	6	17^{†}	14	3	11	2	9	18	116	99
11	Tara Pacheco; Andrés Barrio	Spain	3	5	4	6	5	6	4	3	2	23^{†}	15	19	9	15	12	–	131	108
12	Laura Farese; Matthäus Zöchling	Austria	7	6	10	13	7	3	10	11	14	4	16^{†}	7	12	13	13	–	146	130
13	Natacha Saouma-Pedersen; Mathias Bruun Borreskov	Denmark	4	6	7	4	5	13	5	5	8	13	24^{†}	21	16	14	11	–	156	132
14	Lukas Haberl; Tanja Frank	Austria	9	14	9	10	10	8	8	7	3	8	4	24^{†}	14	16	14	–	158	134
15	Billy Besson; Noa Ancian	France	9	5	12	7	13	10	9	9	9	5	9	8	17	20^{†}	20	–	162	142
16	Ida Svensson; Marcus Dackhammar	Sweden	13	8	8	6	6	6	5	9	10	21	13	15	10	12	RET 26^{†}	–	168	142
17	Santiago Lange; Victoria Travascio	Argentina	8	11	11	12	8	9	14	8	7	UFD 26^{†}	3	13	18	18	18	–	184	158
18	Sarah Newberry Moore; David Liebenberg	United States	15	12	13	8	12	14	8	14	5	12	8	6	13	19^{†}	19	–	178	159
19	Brin Liddell; Rhiannan Brown	Australia	17	13	10	7	7	10	14	12	8	16	2	20	19	21	RET 26^{†}	–	202	176
20	Ruben Booth; Rita Booth Ferrando	Australia	6	10	12	10	9	7	12	16	10	22	25	18	UFD 26^{†}	11	RDG 17	–	211	185
21	Mai Huicong; Chen Linlin	China	10	7	15	17	8	9	9	8	15	UFD 26^{†}	10	16	RET 26	22	17	–	215	189
22	Yang Xuezhe; Hu Xiaoxiao	China	STP 13	8	5	9	10	8	DSQ 26^{†}	11	9	18	22	23	UFD 26	17	15	–	220	194
23	Margherita Porro; Stefano Dezulian	Italy	6	10	9	12	11	16	2	13	RET 26^{†}	11	18	17	21	24	RET 26	–	222	196
24	Archie Gargett; Sarah Hoffman	Australia	8	9	14	13	14	15	16	6	11	19	21	14	20	23^{†}	21	–	224	201
25	Jake Liddell; Lucy Copeland	Australia	11	11	6	11	9	12	12	RET 26^{†}	7	20	23	22	UFD 26	RET 26	16	–	238	212
26	Zhao Huancheng; Wang Saibo	China	12	16	19^{†}	9	12	11	16	6	11	8	3	7	5	8	4	–	147	128
27	Darren Bundock; Lisa Darmanin	Australia	11	15	16	17^{†}	15	17	11	7	12	2	10	2	12	1	3	–	151	134
28	Ding Mingcheng; Sha Su	China	16	UFD 26^{†}	8	15	11	14	11	17	12	5	9	1	2	7	7	–	161	135
29	Samuel Albrecht; Gabriela Nicolino	Brazil	16	18	14	11	18	11	21	UFD 26^{†}	13	9	5	3	1	3	1	–	170	144
30	Margaux Billy; Noah Chauvin	France	14	9	15	15	17^{†}	12	15	10	13	7	4	6	10	9	6	–	162	145
31	João Siemsen; Marina Arndt	Brazil	13	12	13	16	16	17^{†}	13	17	16	11	2	8	4	6	9	–	173	156
32	Shibuki Iituka; Capiglia Oura Nishida	Japan	15	13	11	16	16	15	17	14	18	6	6	10	11	19^{†}	5	–	192	173
33	Willemijn Offerman; Scipio Houtman	Netherlands	19	17	20^{†}	14	14	16	10	13	14	1	1	15	9	17	13	–	193	173
34	Alican Kaynar; Beste Kaynakçı	Turkey	14	15	16	14	13	13	18	19	15	10	16	UFD 25^{†}	3	2	8	–	201	176
35	Iordanis Paschalidis; Myrto Papadopoulou	Greece	STP 21	19	18	19	UFD 26^{†}	21	17	18	17	3	13	4	8	4	2	–	210	184
36	Justin Liu; Denise Lim	Singapore	18	22	17	UFD 26^{†}	15	19	21	15	18	14	12	5	7	5	10	–	224	198
37	Lucas Claeyssens; Mira Vanroose	Belgium	17	14	17	21	18	19	13	16	16	4	8	12	19	11	24^{†}	–	229	205
38	Bart Kooijman; Jella Rike Spijkervet	Netherlands	23	17	19	18	24	RET 26^{†}	18	20	23	16	11	17	6	16	14	–	268	242
39	Puck van der Veen; Wouter van Rooijen	Netherlands	23^{†}	20	22	18	17	20	15	18	21	12	7	22	16	18	19	–	268	245
40	Manolo Geslin Grimaud; Marion Declef	France	21	21	23	UFD 26^{†}	20	21	22	20	19	21	14	16	15	12	11	–	282	256
41	Theo Williams; Jasmine Williams	Great Britain	22	23^{†}	21	20	20	23	23	21	20	18	15	9	14	14	17	–	280	257
42	Carson Crain; Lindsay Gimple	United States	20	18	20	20	23	22	24^{†}	23	21	15	20	11	17	15	15	–	284	260
43	Doiphode Siddheshwar; Ramya Saravanan	India	18	16	18	22	19	18	20	22	22	17	19	13	22	UFD 25^{†}	22	–	293	268
44	Matteo Chaboud; Capucine Raguet	France	19	19	25^{†}	19	19	20	22	21	19	BFD 25	23	19	18	13	18	–	299	274
45	Andrea Aschieri; Anja Camusso	Switzerland	DNF 26^{†}	22	21	21	21	18	20	19	22	BFD 25	18	21	UFD 25	10	12	–	301	275
46	Clément Martineau; Elena Benhayoun	France	24	21	22	23	22	22	19	22	NSC 26^{†}	13	24	14	21	UFD 25	20	–	318	292
47	Arthur De Jonghe; Janne Ravelingien	Belgium	22	20	24	24	21	24	23	15	20	20	22	23	UFD 25^{†}	20	16	–	319	294
48	Yuki Watanabe; Minori Ueda	Japan	21	DNF 26^{†}	23	22	DNF 26	23	19	24	23	DNC 25	17	18	13	UFD 25	23	–	328	302
49	Axel Grandjean; Noemie Fehlmann	Switzerland	24	24	24	23	22	DNF 26^{†}	25	25	24	19	21	20	20	UFD 25	21	–	343	317

Scoring system: low-point system; Source:
Legend: – Qualified for medal race(s); BFD – Black flag disqualification; DNC – Did not come to the starting area; DNF – Did not finish; DSQ – Disqualified; NSC – Did not sail the course; RDG – Redress given; RET – Retired; STP – Standard penalty imposed; UFD – "U" flag disqualification; † – Discarded race not counted in the overall result;
