= Sailing at the 2024 Summer Olympics – Nacra 17 =

Nacra 17 at the Games of the XXXIII Olympiad
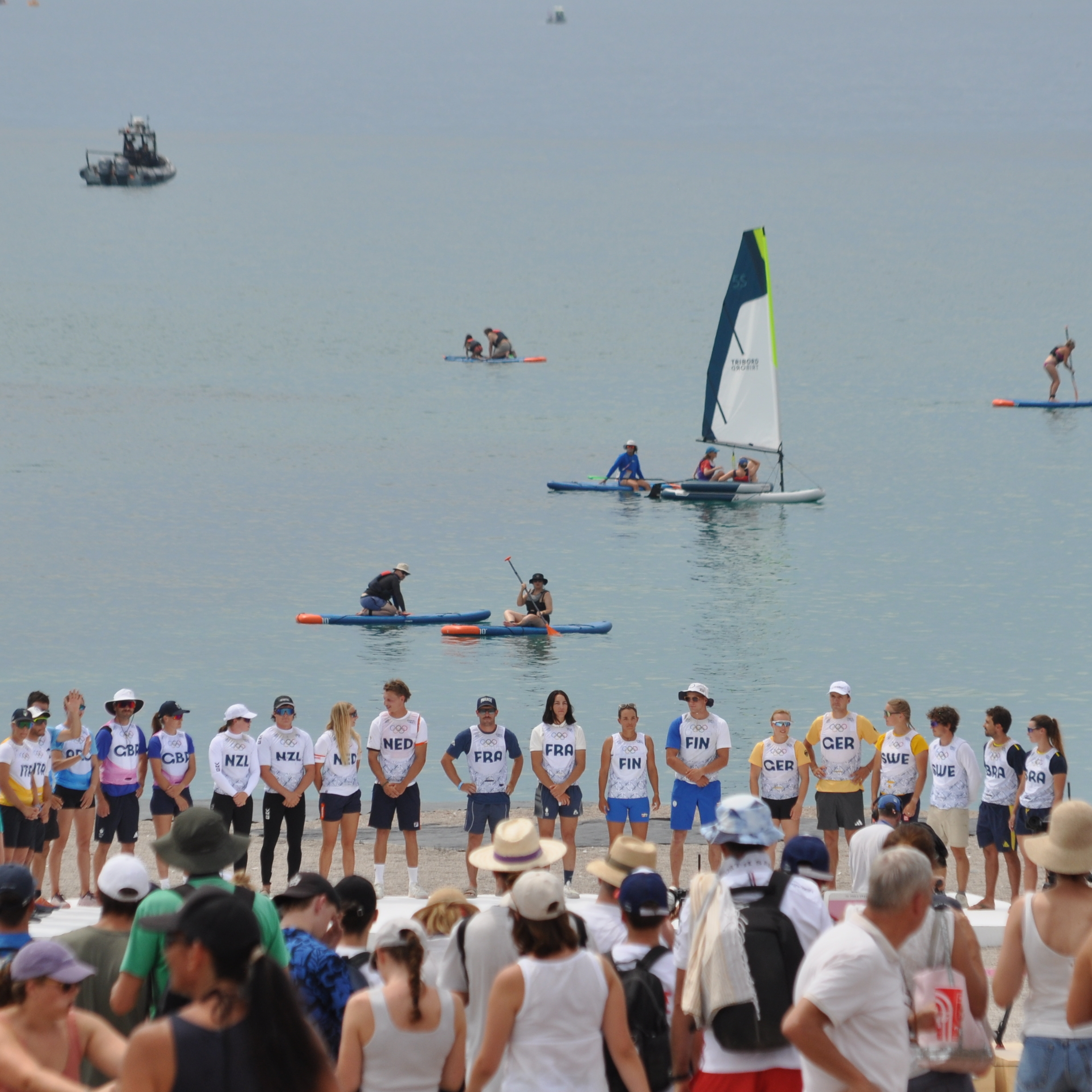
- Contestants in the Nacra 17
- Venues: Marseille, France
- Dates: 3–8 August 2024
- Competitors: 19 from 19 nations

Medalists
1st place, gold medalist(s)		Ruggero Tita; Caterina Banti	Italy
2nd place, silver medalist(s)		Mateo Majdalani; Eugenia Bosco	Argentina
3rd place, bronze medalist(s)		Micah Wilkinson; Erica Dawson	New Zealand

The mixed Nacra 17 is a sailing event part of the Sailing at the 2024 Summer Olympics program in Marseille that took place between 3–8 August 2024 (initially planned for 3-7 August, before the final got postponed due to low wind issues). The event was the multihull catamaran vessel event for the 2024 Olympics. 19 crews represent 19 nations entered in to the event scheduled for 12 preliminary races and a final medal race.

== Schedule ==
Sat 3 Aug	Sun 4 Aug	Mon 5 Aug	Tue 6 Aug	Wed 7 Aug	Thu 8 Aug
Race 1 Race 2 Race 3	Race 4 Race 5 Race 6	Race 7 Race 8 Race 9	Race 10; Race 11; Race 12	~~Medal race~~ Postponed	Medal race

== Results ==
Official results (after all 13 races)

Results of individual races
Pos	Helmsman	Country	I	II	III	IV	V	VI	VII	VIII	IX	X	XI	XII	MR	Tot	Pts
Gold medal	Ruggero Tita; Caterina Banti	Italy	1	1	2	1	1	1	1	6	6	20^{†} UFD	5	2	4	51	31
Silver medal	Mateo Majdalani; Eugenia Bosco	Argentina	2	2	5	10	6	6	3	2	2	1	2	12^{†}	14	67	55
Bronze medal	Micah Wilkinson; Erica Dawson	New Zealand	5	3	7	2	2	3	2	4	9	17^{†}	3	7	16	80	63
4	John Gimson; Anna Burnet	Great Britain	8	4	6	3	4	9^{†}	4	5	4	5	1	3	22; OCS	78	69
5	Tim Mourniac; Lou Berthomieu	France	6	6	8	5	7	4	20^{†} UFD	1	12	4	4	15	2	94	74
6	Laila van der Meer; Bjarne Bouwer	Netherlands	4	20^{†} DNF	9	7	8	8	6	7	3	2	11	5	8	98	78
7	Sinem Kurtbay; Akseli Keskinen	Finland	3	7	4	4	11	5	7	11	11	12	15^{†}	4	18	112	97
8	Paul Kohlhoff; Alica Stuhlemmer	Germany	18^{†}	9	3	6	3	2	13	8	5	14	17	10	10	118	100
9	João Siemsen; Marina Arndt	Brazil	14^{†}	10	11	11	5	11	5	14	7	8	13	14	6	129	115
10	Emil Järudd; Hanna Jonsson	Sweden	13	18^{†}	10	8	9	14	16	13	1	7	6	9	12	136	118
11	Tara Pacheco; Andrés Barrio	Spain	12	8	1	9	15	12	8	9	17	20^{†} UFD	16	6	-	133	113
12	Natacha Saouma-Pedersen; Mathias Bruun Borreskov	Denmark	9	5	12	16^{†}	10	10	14	15	16	10	8	8	-	133	117
13	Brin Liddell; Rhiannan Brown	Australia	11	11	13	13	12	7	9	12	13	6	14	20^{†} RET	-	141	121
14	Mai Huicong; Chen Linlin	China	7	14	15	12	14	13	20^{†} UFD	10	10	16	18	1	-	150	130
15	Lukas Haberl; Tanja Frank	Austria	16^{†}	12	14	15	16	15	15	3	8	9	10	16	-	149	133
16	Sarah Newberry Moore; David Liebenberg	United States	10	16	18	14	13	16	11	20^{†} UFD	15	3	12	13	-	161	141
17	Shibuki Iitsuka; Oura Nishida Capiglia	Japan	17	17	19^{†}	17	17	17	10	17	19	11	7	11	-	179	160
18	Alican Kaynar; Beste Kaynakçı	Turkey	19	13	17	19	18	20^{†} DNF	12	20; UFD	14	13	9	18	-	192	172
19	Lucas Claeyssens; Eline Verstraelen	Belgium	15	15	16	18	19	18	20^{†} UFD	16	18	15	19	17	-	206	186

Scoring system: low-point system;
Legend: – Qualified for medal race(s); BFD – Black flag disqualification; DNC – Did not come to the starting area; DNF – Did not finish; DNS – Did not start; DPI – Discretionary penalty imposed; OCS – On the course side of the starting line; RDG – Redress given; RET – Retired; UFD – "U" flag disqualification; † – Discarded race not counted in the overall result;
