= 2019 in sailing =

The following are the scheduled events of sailing for the year 2019 throughout the world.

== International sailing events ==
- August 12 – 17: 2019 Youth Sailing World Championships in (Russia) Ekaterinburg
- August 6 – 10: 2019 Women's Match Racing World Championship in (Sweden) Lysekil

== 2019 Sailing World Cup ==
- September 9 – 16, 2018: SWC #1 in Enoshima
  - 470 winners: Japan (Keiju Okada & Jumpei Hokazono) (m) / Netherlands (Afrodite Zegers & Anneloes van Veen) (f)
  - 49er(FX) winners: Great Britain (James Peters & Fynn Sterritt) (m) / Brazil (Martine Grael & Kahena Kunze) (f)
  - Laser(Radial) winners: (United Kingdom) Elliot Hanson (m) / (Netherlands) Marit Bouwmeester (f)
  - RS:X winners: (Netherlands) Kiran Badloe (m) / (China) Chen Peina (f)
  - Men's Finn winner: (Netherlands) Nicholas Heiner
  - Mixed Nacra 17 winners: Australia (Jason Waterhouse & Lisa Darmanin)
- January 27 – February 3: SWC #2 in (United States) Miami
  - 470 winners: Spain (Jordi Xammar & Nicolás Rodríguez) (m) / Germany (Frederike Loewe & Anna Markfort) (f)
  - 49er(FX) winners: Germany (Erik Heil & Thomas Plößel) (m) / Brazil (Martine Grael & Kahena Kunze) (f)
  - Laser(Radial) winners: (Norway) Hermann Tomasgaard (m) / (China) Zhang Dongshuang (f)
  - RS:X winners: (China) YE Bing (m) / (China) Lu Yunxiu (f)
  - Men's Finn winner: (Sweden) Max Salminen
  - Mixed Nacra 17 winners: Australia (Jason Waterhouse & Lisa Darmanin)
- April 22 – 28: SWC #3 in (Italy) Genoa
  - 470 winners: New Zealand (Paul Snow-Hansen & Daniel Willcox) (m) / Brazil (Fernanda Oliveira & Ana Barbachan) (f)
  - 49er(FX) winners: Australia (David Gilmour & Lachy Gilmour) (m) / Netherlands (Odile van Aanholt & Marieke Jongens) (f)
  - Laser(Radial) winners: (Hungary) Jonatán Vadnai (m) / (Denmark) Anne-Marie Rindom (f)
  - Men's Finn winner: (Brazil) Jorge Zarif
  - Mixed Nacra 17 winners: Spain (Iker Martínez de Lizarduy & Olga Maslivets)
- June 2 – 9: SWC #4 (final) in (France) Marseille

== 470 ==
- January 19 – 21: 2019 470 North American Championships in (United States) Coconut Grove Sailing Club (Miami)
  - Winners: Greece (Panagiotis Mantis & Pavlos Kagialis) (m) / France (Camille Lecointre & Aloïse Retornaz) (f)
- March 14 – 17: 2019 470 South American Championships in Porto Alegre
  - Winners: Brazil (Ricardo Paranhos & Rodolfo Streibel) (m) / Brazil (Fernanda Oliveira & Ana Barbachan) (f)
- May 6 – 14: 2019 470 Open European Championships in (Italy) Sanremo
  - European winners: Sweden (Anton Dahlberg & Fredrik Bergström) (m) / France (Camille Lecointre & Aloise Retornaz) (f)
  - Men's Open winners: Australia (Mathew Belcher & Will Ryan)
- June 30 – July 7: 2019 470 Junior World Championships in (Slovenia) Portorož
- July 15 – 20: 2019 470 Masters Cup in (Italy) Centro Vela Alto Lario
- July 23 – 30: 2019 470 Junior European Championships in (Spain) Vilagarcía de Arousa
- August 2 – 9: 2019 470 World Championships in (Japan) Enoshima
- September 12 – 15: 2019 470 Eastern Europe Championship in (Lithuania) Elektrėnai

== 49er ==
- May 13 – 19: 2019 49er & 49er FX European Championship in (United Kingdom) Weymouth
  - 49er winners: New Zealand (Peter Burling & Blair Tuke)
  - 49er FX winners: Brazil (Martine Grael & Kahena Kunze)
- July 3 – 7: 2019 49er Junior World Championship in (Norway) Risør
- November 25 – 28: 2019 49er & 49er FX Oceania Championship in (New Zealand) Auckland
- November 29 – December 8: 2019 49er & 49er FX World Championships in (New Zealand) Auckland

== Finn ==
- May 10 – 18: 2019 Finn European Championship in (Greece) Athens
  - Winner: (United Kingdom) Giles Scott
  - U23 winner: (Spain) Joan Cardona
- June 7 – 14: 2019 Finn World Masters in (Denmark) Skovshoved (Copenhagen)
- July 14 – 20: 2019 Finn Silver Sup in (Italy) Anzio
- September 11 – 15: 2019 Finn European Masters in (Germany) Schwerin
- December 13 – 21: 2019 Finn Gold Cup in (Australia) Melbourne

== Laser ==
- July 2 – 9: 2019 Laser World Championship (Men's Standard) in (Japan) Sakaiminato
- July 17 – 24: 2019 Laser Radial World Championship for Men and Women in (Japan) Sakaiminato
- July 24 – 31: 2019 Laser Radial Youth World Championships in (Canada) Kingston
- August 16 – 23: 2019 Laser 4.7 Youth World Championships in (Canada) Kingston
- September 5 – 14: 2019 Laser Masters World Championships in (Netherlands) Port Zélande
- October 26 – November 2: 2019 Laser Under-21 World Championships in (Croatia) Split

== Nacra 17 ==
- March 15 – 19: 2019 Nacra 17 Asian Championship in Shanghai (Dianshan Lake)
  - Winners: China (SHI Junjie & ZHOU Qianaqian)
- May 13 – 19: 2019 Nacra 17 European Championship in (United Kingdom) Weymouth
  - Winners: Great Britain (Ben Saxton & Nicola Boniface)
- July 3 – 7: 2019 Nacra 17 Junior World Championship in (Norway) Risør
- November 25 – 28: 2019 Nacra 17 Oceania Championship in (New Zealand) Auckland
- November 29 – December 8: 2019 Nacra 17 World Championship in (New Zealand) Auckland

== RS:X ==
- January 21 – 23: 2019 RS:X North American Championships in (United States) Miami
  - Winners: (France) Louis Giard (m) / (France) Hélène Noesmoen (f)
- April 7 – 13: 2019 RS:X European & Youth European Championships and Open Trophy in (Spain) Palma de Mallorca
  - Senior winners: (Netherlands) Kiran Badloe (m) / (Netherlands) Lilian de Geus (f)
  - U21 winners: (Israel) Yoav Cohen (m) / (United Kingdom) Emma Wilson (f)
  - Youth (European) winners: (France) Fabien Pianazza (m) / (Israel) Naama Gazit (f)
  - U17 winners: (Israel) Daniel Basik Tashtash (m) / (France) Manon Pianazza (f)
- August 4 – 10: 2019 RS:X Windsurfing Youth World Championships in (Russia) Saint Petersburg
- September 22 – 28: 2019 RS:X World Championship in (Italy) Torbole
- October 6 – 12: 2019 RS:X Windsurfing African Championships in (Algeria) Algiers
