= Sailing at the 2016 Summer Olympics – Nacra 17 =

Nacra 17 at the Games of the XXXI Olympiad
- Line drawing of the Nacra 17
- Venue: Marina da Glória
- Dates: 10–16 August
- Competitors: 40 from 20 nations
- Winning total: 77 points

Medalists
1st place, gold medalist(s)		Santiago Lange; Cecilia Carranza	Argentina
2nd place, silver medalist(s)		Jason Waterhouse; Lisa Darmanin	Australia
3rd place, bronze medalist(s)		Thomas Zajac; Tanja Frank	Austria

The mixed Nacra 17 competition at the 2016 Summer Olympics in Rio de Janeiro took place between 10–16 August at Marina da Glória. Thirteen races (the last one a medal race) were held.

== Schedule ==
Wed 10 Aug	Thu 11 Aug	Fri 12 Aug	Sat 13 Aug	Sun 14 Aug	Mon 15 Aug	Tue 16 Aug
Race 1 Race 2	Race 3 Race 4 Race 5 Race 6	Rest day	Race 7 Race 8 Race 9	Race 10; Race 11; Race 12	Rest day	Medal race

== Results ==
Results of individual races
Pos	Crew	Country	I	II	III	IV	V	VI	VII	VIII	IX	X	XI	XII	MR	Tot	Pts
Gold medal	Santiago Lange; Cecilia Carranza Saroli	Argentina	11	2	14	2	12	6	1	6	9	BFD 21^{†}	2	1	12	98.0	77.0
Silver medal	Jason Waterhouse; Lisa Darmanin	Australia	6	8	4	1	1	5	15	11	11	1	12	17^{†}	4	95.0	78.0
Bronze medal	Thomas Zajac; Tanja Frank	Austria	12^{†}	4	12	6	9	8	8	3	4	10	4	5	6	90.0	78.0
4	Gemma Jones; Jason Saunders	New Zealand	9	15^{†}	7	5	4	2	4	8	12	13	13	2	2	94.0	81.0
5	Vittorio Bissaro; Silvia Sicouri	Italy	10	14	3	3	3	7	6	13^{†}	13	2	7	4	14	97.0	84.0
6	Billy Besson; Marie Riou	France	7	19^{†}	16	8	13	15	2	1	1	3	11	7	10	110.0	93.0
7	Matías Bühler; Nathalie Brugger	Switzerland	1	7	6	19^{†}	11	18	10	7	5	5	1	10	20	119.0	100.0
8	Bora Gulari; Louisa Chafee	United States	13	10	RET 21^{†}	12	RET 21	4	9	2	8	8	9	3	8	127.0	106.0
9	Ben Saxton; Nicola Groves	Great Britain	3	5	2	7	5	3	13	12	16^{†}	15	15	12	18	125.0	109.0
10	Samuel Albrecht; Isabel Swan	Brazil	17	1	18	9	2	16	12	4	19^{†}	7	8	8	16	136.0	117.0
11	Fernando Echavarri; Tara Pacheco	Spain	16	DSQ 21^{†}	5	16	15	10	11	5	3	4	10	6		122.0	101.0
12	Allan Nørregaard; Anette Viborg Andreasen	Denmark	8	9	9	14	10	12	17^{†}	9	7	11	5	15		125.0	108.0
13	Paul Kohlhoff; Carolina Werner	Germany	14	11	10	17	8	13	5	10	2	9	14	18^{†}		130.0	112.0
14	Mandy Mulder; Coen de Koning	Netherlands	5	13	UFD 21^{†}	11	7	14	7	UFD 21	6	14	3	13		133.0	112.0
15	Luke Ramsay; Nikola Girke	Canada	4	17	8	10	16	9	18	UFD 21^{†}	15	12	17	9		154.0	133.0
16	Nicole van der Velden; Thijs Visser	Aruba	15	18	1	15	14	1	19^{†}	17	10	16	16	14		154.0	135.0
17	Pablo Defazio; Mariana Foglia	Uruguay	19^{†}	6	11	13	17	19	16	16	17	6	6	16		161.0	142.0
18	Sofia Bekatorou; Mike Pateniotis	Greece	DNF 21^{†}	DSQ 21	17	4	6	11	3	15	14	18	UFD 21	19		169.0	148.0
19	Justin Liu; Denise Lim	Singapore	2	16	15	18^{†}	18	17	14	14	18	17	UFD 21	11		178.0	157.0
20	Hedi Gharbi; Rihab Hammami	Tunisia	18	UFD 21^{†}	19	DNF 21	19	20	20	18	20	19	18	20		232.0	211.0

Scoring system: low-point system;
Legend: – Qualified for medal race(s); BFD – Black flag disqualification; DNF – Did not finish; DSQ – Disqualified; RET – Retired; UFD – "U" flag disqualification; † – Discarded race not counted in the overall result;
