= Formula 18 World Championship =

Formula 18 Catamaran Worlds

The Formula 18 World Championship and the Formula 18 Raid World Championship also known as the F18 World Championship and Raid F18 Worlds is an annual international sailing regatta for Formula 18, organized by the host club on behalf of the International Formula 18 Class Association and recognized by World Sailing, the sports IOC recognized governing body.

== Editions ==
Host clubs of the World Championship

Host clubs of the World Championship

Event			Host			Sailors			Boats				Ref.
Ed.	Date	Year	Host club	Location	Nat.	No.	Nat.	Cont.	Boats			Mix	Ref.
1	9 - 15 July	2000	Club de Voile de la Baie d'Erquy	Erquy	France	280	10	4	140				
2	15 - 20 July	2001	Parkstone Yacht Club	Poole	United Kingdom	166	8	2	83				
3	22 - 27 July	2002	Lübecker Yacht Club	Travemunde	Germany	208	12	4	104				
4	7 - 13 July	2003	Koksijde Yachting Club	Koksijde	Belgium	204	11	3	102				
5	10 - 16 July	2004	Club Nautico Follonica	Punt Ala	Italy	300	12	3	150				
6	9 - 16 July	2005	Watersport Association of Hoek van Holland	Rotterdam	Netherlands	282	14	3	141				
7	8 - 15 July	2006	Club Multicoques de Hyeres	Hyeres	France	300	11	3	150	133	4	13	
8	19 - 25 Feb	2007	Rydges Capricorn Resort	Yeppoon	Australia	142	9	4	71				
9	5 - 11 July	2008	Club de Vela Playa del Bao	Nigrán (Pontevedra)	Spain	264	15	4	132				
10	10 - 17 July	2009	Royal Belgium Saling Club, Duinbergen	Knokke-Heist	Belgium	346	15	4	173				
11	3 - 10 July	2010	Club de Voile de la Baie d'Erquy	Erquy, Brittany	France	318	18	4	159				
12	1 - 9 July	2011	Balatonfured Yacht Club	Balatonfuredi	Hungary	202	17	4	101				
13	7 - 15 Sept	2012	Alamitos Bay Yacht Club	Long Beach	United States	228	15	5	114				
14	6 - 12 July	2013	Compagnia della Vela Grosseto	Grosseto	Italy	322	27	6	161	135	0	27	
15	5 - 11 July	2014	Ballyholme Yacht Club	Bangor	United Kingdom	114	10	4	57	50	1	6	
16	-	2015	Kieler Yacht Club	Kiel	Germany	334	22	4	167				
17	28 Oct to 4 Nov	2016	Yacht Club Argentino	Buenos Aires	Argentina	82	7	5	41	37	0	4	
18	8 - 15 July	2017	Vallensbaek Sailing Club	Vallensbaek	Denmark	248	21	4	124	98	0	26	
19	12 - 19 Oct	2018	Sarasota Yacht Club	Sarasota	United States	158	13	4	78				
20	-	2019	Club de Vella Ballena Alegre	Ballena Alegre	Spain	246	23	4	123				
N/A	-	2020	Yacht Club Gaeta	Gaeta	Italy	CANCELLED DUE TO COVID-19							
21	-	2021	Yacht Club Gaeta	Gaeta	Italy	158	20	4	79	64	0	15	
22	11 - 16 Oct	2022	Sheraton Sand Key Resort	Clearwater Beach, Florida	United States	124	12	4	62	55	0	7	
23	21 - 30 July	2023	Travemünder Woche	Lübeck	Germany	194	17	4	97				
24	28 June to 5 July	2024	Club de Vella Ballena Alegre	Ballena Alegre	Spain	262	22	5	131	105	1	25	
25	4 - 11 July	2025	Zeesport Vereniging Noordwijk; Royal Yacht Club Hollandia	Noordwijk	Netherlands	192	17	5	96				
26	Jan	2026	Jervoise Bay Sailing Club	Munster, WA	Australia	151	11	5	75	57	1	17	

== Raid Editions ==
Event			Host			Sailors			Boats				Ref.
Ed.	Date	Year	Host club	Location	Nat.	Comp.	Nats	Cont.	Boats	Male	Fem.	Mix	Ref.
R1	28 July to 1 Aug	2004	Club de Voile de la Baie d'Erquy	Erquy, Brittany	France								
R2	-	2017		Stockholm Archipelago	Sweden	54	8	3	27	23	0	4	
R3	-	2018		Costarmoricaine Raid	France	38	6	1	19	15	0	4	
R4	-	2020		Martinique Cata	France								
R5	-	2022		Stockholm Archipelago	Sweden	58	10	3	29				
R6		2023	Club de Voile de la Baie d'Erquy	Erquy, Brittany	France	46	7	2	23	17	0	6	
R7	8 - 13 Aug	2024	Club de Voile de la Baie d'Erquy	Erquy, Brittany	France								
R8	30 July -3 Aug	2025	Club de Voile de la Baie d'Erquy	Erquy, Brittany	France	38	5	2	19	15	0	4	
R9		2026	Club de Voile de la Baie d'Erquy	Erquy, Brittany	France								

== Multiple World Champions ==
Compiled from the data below the table includes up to and including 2026.

Ranking	Sailor	Gold	Silver	Bronze	Total	No. Entries	Ref.
1	Darren Bundock (AUS)	6	2	3	11	13	
2	Mitch Booth (NED)	4	3	1	8	17	
3	Herbert Dercksen (NED)	3	2	0	5	8	
4	Glenn Ashby (AUS)	3	1	3	6	11	
5	Brett Burvill (AUS)	2	1	2	5	11	
5	Max Puttman (AUS)	2	1	2	5	9	
7	Ferdinand Van West (NED)	2	0	2	4	7	
8	Gunnar Larsen (NED)	2	0	0	2	13	
8	Jeroen Van Leeuwen (NED)	2	0	0	2	10	
8	Coen De Koning (NED)	2	0	0	2	7	
8	Olivier Backes (FRA)	2	0	0	2	2	
8	Pablo Volker (ARG)	2	0	0	2	9	

== Medalists ==
Year	Gold	Silver	Bronze	Ref.
2000	Design - Hobie Tiger; Mitch Booth (NED); Herbert Dercksen (NED)	Design - Cirrus; Jean-Christophe Mourniac (FRA); Philippe Mourniac (FRA)	Design - Hobie Tiger; Andrew Landenberger (AUS); Philippe Neiras (FRA)	
2001	Design - Hobie Tiger; Mitch Booth (NED); Herbert Dercksen (NED)	Design - Cirrus; Jean-Christophe Mourniac (FRA); Philippe Mourniac (FRA)	Design - Hobie Tiger; Billy Besson (FRA); Arnaud Jarlegan (FRA)	
2002	Design - Hobie Tiger; Mitch Booth (NED); Herbert Dercksen (NED)	Design - Cirrus; Jean-Christophe Mourniac (FRA); Philippe Mourniac (FRA)	Design - Nacra Inter 2 Darren Bundock (AUS); Luca Remagnino (ITA)	
2003	Design - Cirrus; Emmanuel Boulogne (FRA); Vincent Boulogne (FRA)	Design - Hobie Tiger; Gavin Colby (AUS); Cory Camenisch (SUI)	Design - Hobie Tiger; Darren Bundock (AUS); Glen Ashby (AUS)	
2004	Design - Hobie Tiger; Darren Bundock (AUS); Glen Ashby (AUS)	Design - Hobie Tiger; Mitch Booth (NED); Herbert Dercksen (NED)	Design - Hobie Tiger; Gavin Colby (AUS); Cory Camenisch (SUI)	
2005	Darren Bundock (AUS); Glen Ashby (AUS)	Mitch Booth (NED); Herbert Dercksen (NED)	Helge Sach (GER); Christian Sach (GER)	
2006	Design - Capricorn; Helge Sach (GER); Christian Sach (GER)	Darren Bundock (AUS); Glen Ashby (AUS)	Design - Capricorn; Andrew Landenberger (AUS); Felix Egner (GER)	
2007	Darren Bundock (AUS); Glen Ashby (AUS)	Mitch Booth (NED); Pim Nieuwenhuis (NED)	Billy Besson (FRA); Arnaud Jarlegan (FRA)	
2008	Coen de Koning (NED); Jeroen van Leeuwen (NED)	Franck Cammas (FRA); Jeremy Lagarrigue (FRA)	Mischa Heemskerk (NED); Bastiaan Tentij (NED)	
2009	Nacra Infusion; Coen de Koning (NED); Thijs Visser (NED)	Shockwave; Rob Wilson (GBR); Marcus Lynch (GBR)	Nacra Infusion; Hugh Styles (GBR); Ferdinand van West (NED)	
2010	Olivier Backes (FRA); Arnaud Jarlegan (FRA)	Darren Bundock (AUS); William Howden (GBR)	Hugh Styles (GBR); Ferdinand van West (NED)	
2011	Design - C2; Darren Bundock (AUS); Jeroen van Leeuwen (NED)	Design - Cirrus R. Mischa Heemskerk (NED); Bastiaan Tentij (NED)	Design - Hobie Wildcat; Vittoro Bissaro (ITA); Lamberto Cesari (ITA)	
2012	Olivier Backes (FRA); Matthieu Vandame (FRA)	Oscar Zeekant (NED); Karel Begemann (NED)	Billy Besson (FRA); Jeremie Laguarrigue (FRA)	
2013	Design - Nacra Infusion; Billy Besson (FRA); Jeremie Lagarrigue (FRA)	Design - Phantom; Hugh Styles (GBR); Richard Mason (GBR)	Design - Nacra Infusion; Mitch Booth (ESP); Jordi Booth (ESP)	
2014	Design - Nacra Infusion; Gunnar Larsen (NED); Ferdinand van West (NED)	Design - Phantom; Gurvan Bontemps (FRA); Benjamin Amiot (FRA)	Design - c2 Taylor Reiss (USA); Matthew Whitehead (USA)	
2015	Design - Nacra Infusion; Gunnar Larsen (NED); Ferdinand van West (NED)	Oscar Zeekant (NED); Karel Begemann (NED)	Glenn Ashby (AUS); Brett Goodall (AUS)	
2016	Design - F18 Phantom; Pablo Völker (ARG); Juan Martín Benitez (ARG)	Cruz Gonzalez Smith (ARG); Mariano Heuser (ARG)	Jason Hess (GUA); Nicolás Schargorodsky (GUA)	
2017	Design - eXploder Scorpion F18; Mischa Heemskerk (NED); Stephan Dekker (NED)	Patrick Demesmaeker (BEL); Gilles Tas (BEL)	Jolbert van Dijk (NED); Frank de Waard (NED)	
2018	Design - eXploder Scorpion F18; Iordanis Paschalidis (GRE); Konstantinos Trigkonis (GRE)	Michael Easton (USA); Tripp Burd (USA)	Taylor Reiss (USA); Matthew Whitehead (USA)	
2019	AUS 888; Design - eXploder Scorpion F18; Darren Bundock (AUS); Conor Nicholas (AUS)	GRE 7 - REDBULL; Design - eXploder Scorpion F18; Iordanis Paschalidis (GRE); Konstantinos Trigkonis (GRE)	ARG 11 - OH! Design - eXploder Scorpion F18; Cruz Gonzalez Smith (ARG); Mariano Heuser (ARG)	
2020	CANCELLED COVID-19			
2021	AUS 1 Design - eXploder Scorpion F18; Mitch Booth (AUS); Ruben Booth (ESP)	ARG 11; Design - eXploder Scorpion F18; Cruz Gonzalez Smith (ARG); Mariano Heuser (ARG)	ARG 1 Design - eXploder Scorpion F18; Agustin KREVISKY (ARG); Nicolas Aragones (ARG)	
2022	USA 1 Design - Nacra F18 Evolution; Ravi Parent (USA); Severin Gramm (USA)	AUS 05 - GUMA Gavin Colby (AUS); Kai Colman (AUS)	ARG 11 - Crazy Chicken Cruz Gonzalez Smith (ARG); Mariano Heuser (ARG)	
2023	SWE 141; Design - Scorpion; Emil Järudd (SWE); Rasmus Rosengren (SWE)	AUS 5 Design - Scorpion; Gavin Colby (AUS); Kai Colman (AUS)	AUS 3 Design - Edge; Brett Burvill (AUS); Max Puttman (AUS)	
2024	ESP 042 - JARANA (32); Design - Akurra; Pablo Völker (ESP); Federico Polimeni (ESP)	AUS 3 - WINDRUSH NEXT GEN (13); Design - Edge/Next Generation; Brett Burvill (AUS); Max Puttman (AUS)	ESP 21 - A BORDO WATER SPORTS (44); Design - Akurra; Toni Rivas Mas (ESP); Jordi Sanchez (ESP)	
2025	AUS 888; Design - eXploder; Darren Bundock (AUS); Bjarne Bouwer (NED)	AUS 7 Design - eXploder; Brin Liddell (AUS); Jake Liddell (AUS)	AUS 3 Design - Edge; Brett Burvill (AUS); Max Puttman (AUS)	
2026	AUS 3 (3); Design - Edge; Brett Burvill (AUS); Max Puttman (AUS)	AUS 41 (61); Design - Scorpion; Matt Homan (AUS); Kris Bilston (AUS)	AUS 888 (1); Design - Exploder F18; Darren Bundock (AUS); Glenn Ashby (AUS)	

== Raid Medallists ==
Year	Gold	Silver	Bronze	Ref.
2004
2017	SWE-2; Leff Dahl (SWE); Roger Boden (SWE)	GBR-508; William Sunnucks (GBR); Freddie White (GBR)	ARG-1912; Elke Delnooz (ARG); Jerone Van Leeuwen (ARG)	
2018	FRA-1896; Design - Nacra Infusion; Benoit Champanhac (FRA); Hugo Dhallenne (FRA)	FRA-124; Design - CirrusR; Cedric Fleury (FRA); Delphine Fleury (FRA)	FRA-1962; Design - Capricorn C2; Nicolas Touchot (FRA); Pierre-yves Durand (FRA)	
2020	FRA-66; Franck Cammas (FRA); Matthieu Vandame (FRA)	FRA-111; Frederic Moreau (FRA); Matthieu Souben (FRA)	FRA-901; Emmanuel Boulogne (FRA); Vincent Boulogne (FRA)	
2022	BEL-1; Patrick Demesmaeker (BEL); Olivier Gagliani (BEL)	SWE-111; Jakob Lundqvist (SWE); Rasmus Rosengren (SWE)	SWE-7; Fredrik Karlsson (SWE); Niklas Nordblom (SWE)	
2023	AUS-3; Design - Edge; Brett Burvill (AUS); Max Puttman (AUS)	FRA-5; Design - Akurra; Victorien Erussard (FRA); Frederic Moreau (FRA)	FRA-51; Design - Exploder Scorpion; Matteo Chevrier (FRA); Gaspard Cosse (FRA)	
2024
2025	FRA-7; Emeric Dary (FRA); David Fanouillere (FRA)	FRA-5; Matteo Chevrier (FRA); Gaspard Cosse (FRA)	USA-008; Cedric Fleury (USA); Nicolas Ploe (USA)	
