= Erica Dawson (sailor) =

New Zealand sailor (born 1994)

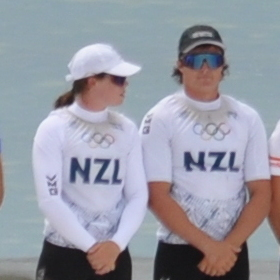
- Dawson (left) and Micah Wilkinson in 2024

Personal information
- Born: 24 July 1994 (age 32) Auckland, New Zealand
- Height: 165 cm (5 ft 5 in)

Sailing career
- Sport: Sailing
- Class: Nacra 17
Medal record
Sailing
Representing New Zealand
Olympic Games
Bronze medal – third place	2024 Paris	Nacra 17

Erica Dawson (born 24 July 1994) is a New Zealand sailor. She competed in the 2020 Olympic Games in Tokyo, as crew for Micah Wilkinson in the Nacra 17 class. She competed in the Nacra 17 event at the 2024 Summer Olympics, where she won a bronze medal with Wilkinson.

== Career ==
Born in Auckland, Dawson started sailing in her youth. She started sailing in Murrays Bay Sailing Club. She became the first girl to win the national championship in the Starling class. Dawson competed in the 2012 ISAF Youth Sailing World Championships together with Ellie Copeland, finishing fifth in the girls' 420 event.

Dawson continued her sailing career in the 49er FX class, with her first 49er FX competition being the 2014 49er & 49er FX European Championships in Helsinki where she placed 28th together with Copeland.

In 2019, Dawson switched to Nacra 17, first as helmsman but then switched roles with crew Micah Wilkinson. They finished 7th in the 2020 Nacra 17 World Championship in Melbourne. In March 2020, the duo was selected for the 2020 Tokyo Olympics in the Nacra 17 event. The sailing duo, coached by Jo Aleh, practised with Australian duo Jason Waterhouse and Lisa Darmanin for the event. In June 2021, during the preparations for the Olympics, Dawson broke her fibula while practising. In the 2020 Olympics, they finished 12th in their Nacra 17 event.

In 2021, Dawson and Liv Mackay were selected for the New Zealand SailGP Team team in the SailGP series. Dawson sailed as a strategist for New Zealand SailGP Team.

During 2022, Wilkinson and Dawson continued to sail in the Nacra 17 and finished second in the Nacra 17 European Championship in Aarhus. The duo was coached by former Tornado sailor Antón Paz. In the following Nacra 17 World Championship in Halifax, they finished 9th.
