= Nicola Groves =

British competitive sailor (born 1989)

Personal information
- Nationality: British
- Born: 4 April 1989 (age 37)
- Height: 5 ft 6 in (168 cm)
- Weight: 63 kg (139 lb)

Sport
- Sport: Sailing

Nicola Groves (born 4 April 1989) is a British competitive sailor. She competed for Great Britain at the 2016 Summer Olympics in Rio de Janeiro.

== Early life ==
Groves was born and raised in London, England. When Groves was 10 or 11, her mother took Groves and her brother to a local sailing club, Island Barn Reservoir Sailing Club in West Molesey, to give the children something to do during the weekend. Groves attended Exeter University where she competed in sailing. She was part of Exeter's winning team at the 2009 BUCS Fleet Racing Championships. She graduated in 2010 with a BSc in Human Biosciences.

== Career ==
In 2013, Groves was paired with Penny Clark and competing for Team Great Britain in 49er FX skiff sailing event with her sights set on that event for the 2016 Summer Olympics. Groves then competed with Frances Peters, still in the 49er FX.

In 2014, Groves partnered with Ben Saxton, competing in Nacra 17 mixed multihull events. The pairs first competition was the 2015 Miami World Cup Regatta where they placed second. Groves and Saxton were 2015 European Champions in their event. In December 2015 Groves and Saxton placed third at the Copa do Brazil in Rio. To start the 2016 season they placed sixth at both the Sailing World Cup Miami, and the Nacra 17 World Championship.

Heading into the 2016 Olympics, Groves and Saxton were ranked 6th in the world in Nacra 17 class. 2016 marked the return of the multihull discipline to the Olympics and marked the first time the event was contested at the Olympics with mixed teams of women and men. She competed at the 2016 Summer Olympics in Rio de Janeiro, in the mixed Nacra 17, finishing in 9th place.

Groves retired from Olympic sailing in 2017.
