= Ben Saxton =

Ben Saxton may refer to:

- Ben Saxton (volleyball)
- Ben Saxton (sailor)
