= Dabson =

Dabson is a surname. Notable people with the surname include:

- Hilton Dabson (1912–1984), American Thoroughbred horse racing jockey and racehorse trainer
- Katie Dabson, British sailor
