= Caterina Banti =

Italian sailor (born 1987)

Personal information
- Full name: Caterina Marianna Banti
- Born: 13 June 1987 (age 39) Rome, Italy

Sailing career
- Sport: Sailing
- Class: Nacra 17
Medal record
Women's sailing
Representing Italy
Olympic Games
Olympic Games
Gold medal – first place	2020 Tokyo	Nacra 17
Gold medal – first place	2024 Paris	Nacra 17
World Championships
Gold medal – first place	2018 Aarhus	Nacra 17
Gold medal – first place	2022 Halifax	Nacra 17
Gold medal – first place	2023 The Hague	Nacra 17
Gold medal – first place	2024 La Grande-Motte	Nacra 17
Bronze medal – third place	2017 La Grande-Motte	Nacra 17
European Championships
Gold medal – first place	2017 Kiel	Nacra 17
Gold medal – first place	2018 Gdynia	Nacra 17
Gold medal – first place	2020 Lake Attersee	Nacra 17
Gold medal – first place	2022 Aarhus	Nacra 17

Caterina Marianna Banti (born 13 June 1987) is an Italian sailor who specializes in the Nacra 17 class. Two-time Olympic champion with Nacra 17 in Tokyo 2020 and Paris 2024.

== Career ==
She and Ruggero Tita won two medals at the Nacra 17 World Championship, gold in 2018 and bronze in 2017, and three gold medals at the Nacra 17 European Championship, between 2017 and 2020. They were nominated by the Italian Sailing Federation (FIV) to compete at the 2020 Summer Olympics.

At the postponed Tokyo 2020 Summer Olympics, they raced their boat at Enoshima alongside their British training partners of Anna Burnet and John Gimson. They beat them into second place and were awarded with gold medals. They repeated this at the 2024 Olympics winning more gold medals.

She holds a bachelor's degree in foreign languages at the La Sapienza University of Rome.
