= 2023 Sailing World Championships =

Event title
- Edition: 6th

Event details
- Venue: The Hague, the Netherlands
- Dates: 8–20 August 2023
- Titles: 14

Competitors
- Competing nations: 80
- Qualification(s): 2024 Summer Olympics

The 2023 Sailing World Championships were held in The Hague, the Netherlands, from 8 to 20 August 2023. It was the sixth edition of the Sailing World Championships and the world championships for all disciplines at the next Olympics, and for four para sailing classes. It took place on the waters off Scheveningen and offered the chance to qualify for the 2024 Summer Olympics in Paris, France, whose sailing competition were held in Marseille. Para sailing was held on Braassemermeer. Approximately 1,400 sailors were expected.

The venue hosted the 2022 Youth Sailing World Championships.

== Host selection ==
The following cities competed to win the right to host the Championships.

- Auckland, New Zealand
- The Hague, Netherlands

In May 2018, The Hague was chosen host of the championship. In 2020, it was decided the championships will be held in 2023 instead of 2022 due to the COVID-19 pandemic and the postponement of the 2020 Summer Olympics.

== Competition format ==
=== Events and equipment ===
The following events are open for entries:

Event	Equipment	Max. entries
Olympic events
Men's dinghy	ILCA 7	140
Men's skiff	49er	85
Men's windsurfer	iQFoil	100
Men's kiteboarding	Formula Kite	90
Women's dinghy	ILCA 6	120
Women's skiff	49er FX	70
Women's kiteboarding	Formula Kite	60
Women's windsurfer	iQFoil	100
Mixed dinghy	470	70
Mixed multihull	Nacra 17	80
Para sailing events
Men's one-person non-technical	Hansa 303	50
Women's one-person non-technical	Hansa 303	30
Open one-person technical	2.4 Metre	40
Open two-person technical	RS Venture Connect	16

== Summary ==
=== Medal table ===
* Host nation (Netherlands)

Rank	Nation	Gold	Silver	Bronze	Total
1	Netherlands*	2	1	0	3
2	France	2	0	1	3
3	Italy	1	1	2	4
4	Japan	1	1	1	3
5	Germany	1	1	0	2
5	Israel	1	1	0	2
5	Poland	1	1	0	2
8	Australia	1	0	2	3
9	Sweden	1	0	1	2
10	Hungary	1	0	0	1
10	Singapore	1	0	0	1
10	United States	1	0	0	1
13	Great Britain	0	3	2	5
14	Switzerland	0	2	0	2
15	Portugal	0	1	1	2
15	Spain	0	1	1	2
17	Slovenia	0	1	0	1
18	Canada	0	0	1	1
18	Denmark	0	0	1	1
18	New Zealand	0	0	1	1
Totals (20 entries)		14	14	14	42

=== Event medalists ===
Event	Gold	Silver	Bronze
470	Keiju Okada; Miho Yoshioka; Japan	Jordi Xammar; Nora Brugman; Spain	Tetsuya Isozaki; Yurie Seki; Japan
49er	Bart Lambriex; Floris van de Werken; Netherlands	Sebastien Schneiter; Arno De Planta; Switzerland	Diego Botín; Florián Trittel; Spain
49er FX	Vilma Bobeck; Rebecca Netzler; Sweden	Odile van Aanholt; Annette Duetz; Netherlands	Olivia Price; Evie Haseldine; Australia
Men's Formula Kite	Maximilian Maeder; Singapore	Toni Vodišek; Slovenia	Axel Mazella; France
Women's Formula Kite	Lauriane Nolot; France	Eleanor Aldridge; Great Britain	Lily Young; Great Britain
ILCA 7	Matthew Wearn; Australia	Michael Beckett; Great Britain	George Gautrey; New Zealand
ILCA 6	Mária Érdi; Hungary	Maud Jayet; Switzerland	Anne-Marie Rindom; Denmark
Men's iQFoil	Luuc van Opzeeland; Netherlands	Sebastian Kördel; Germany	Nicolò Renna; Italy
Women's iQFoil	Shahar Tibi; Israel	Katy Spychakov; Israel	Emma Wilson; Great Britain
Nacra 17	Ruggero Tita; Caterina Banti; Italy	John Gimson; Anna Burnet; Great Britain	Emil Järudd; Hanna Jonsson; Sweden
Men's Hansa 303	Piotr Cichocki; Poland	Takumi Niwa; Japan	João Pinto; Portugal
Women's Hansa 303	Betsy Alison; United States	Olga Górnaś-Grudzień; Poland	Alison Weatherly; Australia
2.4 Metre	Heiko Kröger; Germany	Antonio Squizzato; Italy	Davide Di Maria; Italy
RS Venture Connect	Ange Margaron; Olivier Ducruix; France	Pedro Reis; Guilherme Ribeiro; Portugal	John McRoberts; Scott Lutes; Canada

== Participating national federations ==
Participating national federations and number of boats per federation:

- Angola (2)
- Antigua and Barbuda (2)
- Argentina (14)
- Aruba (3)
- Australia (36)
- Austria (13)
- Bahamas (1)
- Belgium (9)
- Belize (1)
- Bermuda (4)
- Brazil (17)
- British Virgin Islands (1)
- Bulgaria (3)
- Canada (19)
- Cayman Islands (2)
- Chile (5)
- China (28)
- Chinese Taipei (2)
- Colombia (3)
- Croatia (13)
- Cyprus (6)
- Czech Republic (17)
- Denmark (21)
- Dominican Republic (2)
- Ecuador (1)
- El Salvador (1)
- Estonia (9)
- Fiji (2)
- Finland (14)
- France (52)
- Germany (38)
- Great Britain (44)
- Greece (19)
- Guatemala (2)
- Hong Kong (13)
- Hungary (6)
- India (13)
- Ireland (6)
- Israel (24)
- Italy (36)
- Japan (29)
- Latvia (5)
- Lithuania (7)
- Macau (1)
- Malaysia (3)
- Malta (1)
- Mauritius (2)
- Mexico (8)
- Monaco (1)
- Montenegro (2)
- Morocco (1)
- Mozambique (1)
- Netherlands (40)
- New Zealand (25)
- Norway (13)
- Oman (4)
- Peru (6)
- Poland (29)
- Portugal (13)
- Puerto Rico (1)
- Romania (1)
- Saint Lucia (1)
- Samoa (2)
- Serbia (1)
- Singapore (6)
- Slovakia (2)
- Slovenia (8)
- South Korea (4)
- Spain (31)
- Sweden (20)
- Switzerland (22)
- Thailand (10)
- Tonga (1)
- Tunisia (3)
- Turkey (16)
- U.S. Virgin Islands (2)
- Ukraine (4)
- United States (39)
- Uruguay (3)
- Venezuela (2)
