= Hanna Jonsson =

Swedish sailor

Personal information
- Nationality: Swedish
- Born: 20 January 1999 (age 27)

Sailing career
- Sport: Sailing
- Class: Nacra 17
Medal record
Sailing
Representing Sweden
World Championships
Bronze medal – third place	2023 The Hague	Nacra 17

Hanna Jonsson (born 20 January 1999) is a Swedish professional Olympic sailor.

== Career ==
In 2023, together with Emil Järudd, won bronze at the 2023 Sailing World Championships in the Hague. In May 2024, Jonsson and Järudd was again chosen to represent Sweden over Ida Svensson and Nicklas Dackhammar. In the Nacra 17 event, the Järudd–Jonsson pair finished 10th.
