= Rihab Hammami =

Tunisian sailor

Rihab Hammami (born June 4, 1989) is a Tunisian sailor. She and Hedi Gharbi placed 20th in the Nacra 17 event at the 2016 Summer Olympics.
