= Anna Burnet =

British Olympic sailor (born 1992)

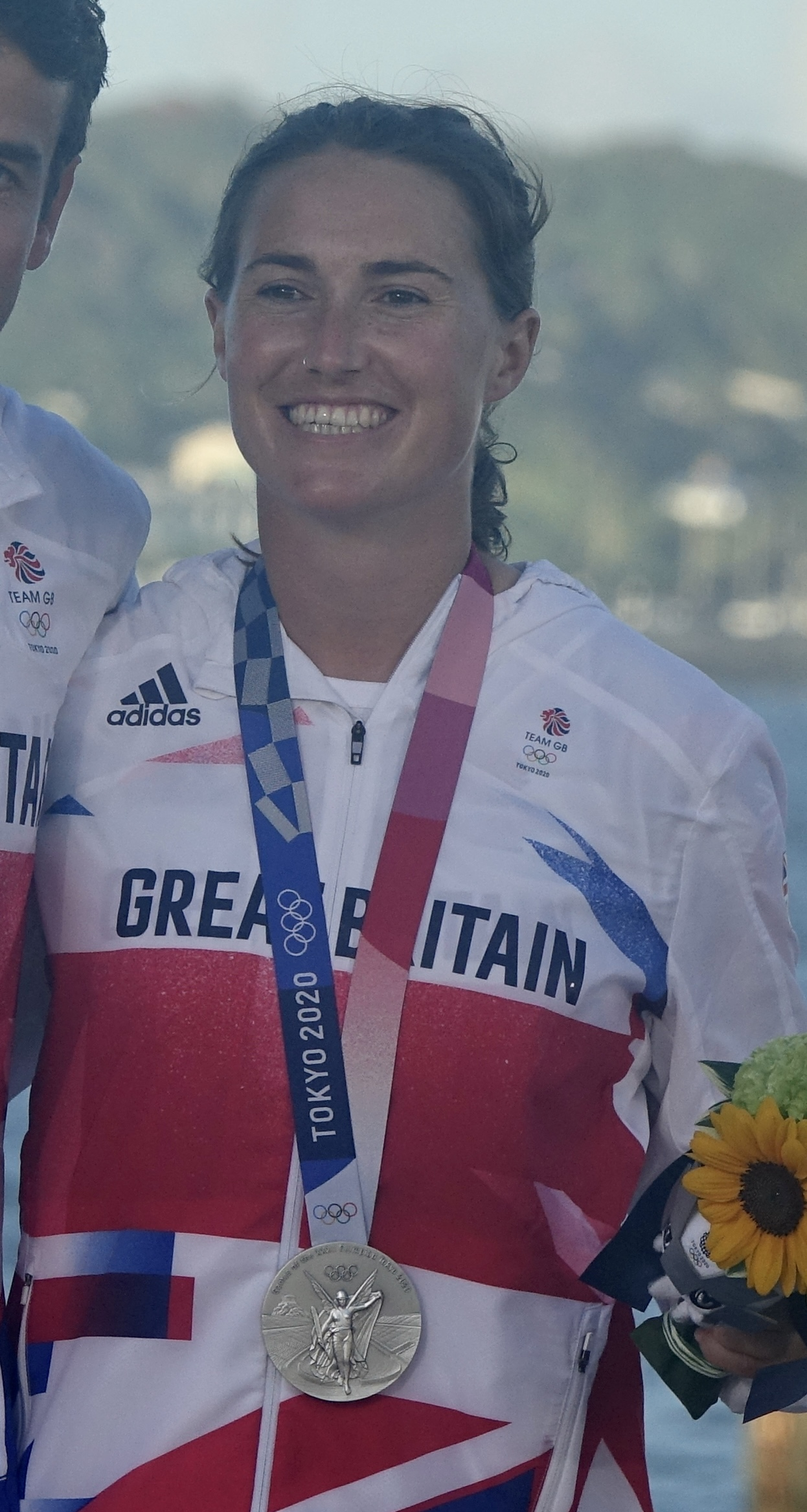
- Burnet in 2021

Personal information
- Full name: Anna Meryl Burnet
- Nationality: British
- Born: 27 September 1992 (age 34) Hammersmith, London, England

Sailing career
- Sport: Sailing
- Class: Nacra 17
Medal record
Sailing
Representing Great Britain
Olympic Games
Silver medal – second place	Tokyo 2020	Nacra 17
Nacra 17 World Championship
Gold medal – first place	2025 Cagliari	Nacra 17
Gold medal – first place	2020 Geelong	Nacra 17
Gold medal – first place	2021 Mussanah	Nacra 17
Silver medal – second place	2024 La Grande-Motte	Nacra 17
Silver medal – second place	2023 The Hague	Nacra 17
Bronze medal – third place	2026 Quiberon	Nacra 17
Nacra 17 European Championship
Gold medal – first place	2025 Thessaloniki	Nacra 17
Gold medal – first place	2023 Vilamoura	Nacra 17
Gold medal – first place	2021 Thessaloniki	Mixed
Silver medal – second place	2026 Eckernförde	Nacra 17
Silver medal – second place	2019 Weymouth	Nacra 17

Anna Meryl Burnet (born 27 September 1992) is a British Olympic silver medallist and two-time world champion in sailings Mixed multihull Olympic discipline. She lives in Scotland. In 2020 she became world champion in the Nacra 17 World Championship with partner John Gimson. They were selected for the British Olympic team and gained silver medals at the 2020 Summer Olympics. The duo have won many international medals in the Olympic discipline highlights include winning the World championships twice 2020/2021. They have also won the European championships three times 2021,2023,2025.

== Early life and career ==
Burnet was born in 1992. Her father was keen on sailing and her uncle, an inspiration, was the sailor Sir Peter Blake. As a teenager she went to train with Olympian Joe Glanfield who helped her to plan her ambitions to think about attending one to win at one later. She was sailing in Optimist class and became the female national champion. She moved onto the 420 class and in time to 470 boats.

She took a degree in Sports Studies at Southampton University.

She and Gimson won a gold medal during Kiel Week in 2018.

She represented the UK, along with partner John Gimson, in the Nacra 17 class at the 2020 Summer Olympics in Tokyo. This fitted in with her plans as she and Gimson had decided to compete at the 2024 Summer Olympics in Paris. In 2020 the World Championship was in Australia, and as they practised there they had to wear face masks to prevent inhaling smoke from the 2020 Australian wildfire. They won and were world champions when the 2020 Olympics was postponed for a year and other important events were cancelled as a result of the COVID-19 pandemic.

They were selected for the British Olympic team which was then planned to be in staged in 2020 in Tokyo. They were chosen before their British rival sailing team of Nicola Boniface and Ben Saxton. At the Tokyo Olympics they raced their boat at Enoshima alongside their Italian training partners of Ruggero Tita and Caterina Banti. They finished behind them and were awarded with silver medals.

In July 2024 she was preparing for the Paris 2024 Olympics to compete again at sailing in Nacra 17. At the Olympics in August 2024 she and her partner were disqualified from the Nacra 17 medel race. They crossed the starting line early and failed to return to the start line. Having gone to the medal race in third position overall, this meant that they lost their medal and finished fourth overall. The two were due to marry in the following month.

In 2024, she was also a member of the first team of women to compete for the Women's America's Cup. Other team members were Tash Bryant, Hattie Rogers, Saskia Tidey and Ellie Aldridge captained by Hannah Mills. The team made it through the heats and their boat Athena Pathway was beaten in the finals in October by the Italians.

In 2025 she and John Gimson won Gold at the Long Beach Olympic Sailing Grand Slam for the Nacra 17. They were well ahead of silver winners Laura Farese and Matthäus Zochling of Austria after winning two thirds of the fifteen races. Lukas Haberl and Clara Stamminger came in third place for the Bronze.
