= Hedi Gharbi =

Tunisian sailor

Hedi Gharbi (born August 5, 1969) is a Tunisian sailor. He and Rihab Hammami placed 20th in the Nacra 17 event at the 2016 Summer Olympics.
