= Billy Besson =

French competitive sailor (born 1981)

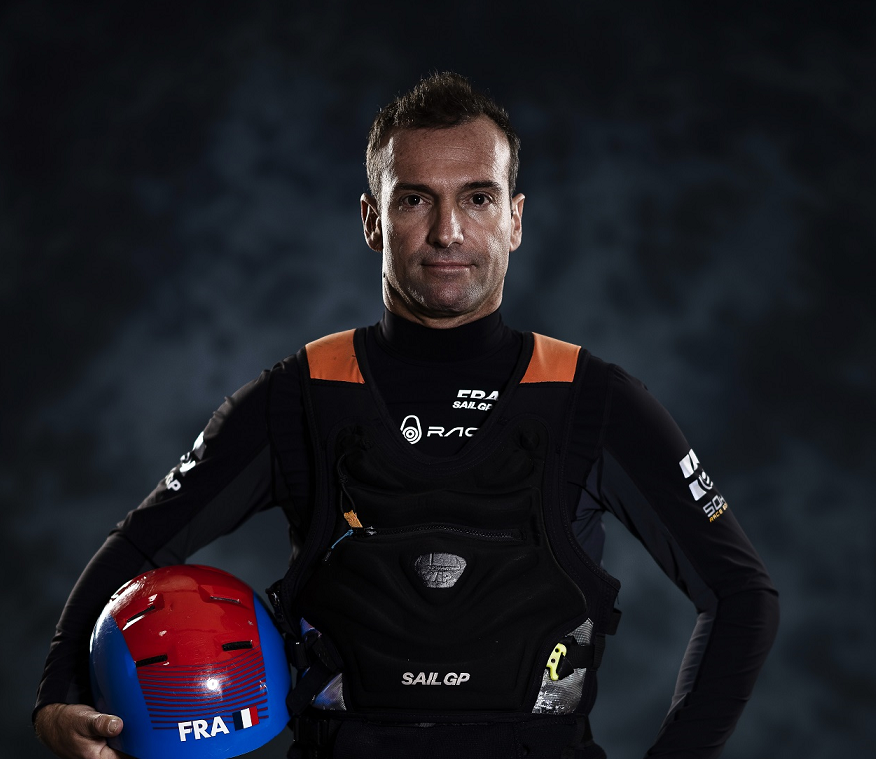

Personal information
- Nationality: French
- Born: 8 March 1981 (age 45) Papeete, French Polynesia
- Height: 1.70 m (5 ft 7 in)
- Weight: 70 kg (154 lb)

Sailing career
- Sport: Sailing
Medal record
Sailing
Representing France
World Championships in Sailing
Gold medal – first place	Hobie 16	1998 - Youth
Gold medal – first place	Dart 18	2008
Gold medal – first place	Formula 18	2013
Gold medal – first place	Nacra 17	2013
Gold medal – first place	Nacra 17	2014
Gold medal – first place	Nacra 17	2015
Gold medal – first place	Nacra 17	2016

Billy Besson (born 8 March 1981) is a French competitive sailor.

Besson was born in Papeete, French Polynesia where multihulls are central to the sailing culture. A child of Tahiti, he lived there with his family and learned to sail there. He won a gold medal at the 1998 ISAF Youth Sailing World Championships while representing Tahati.

World champion on the Dart 18 and F18, Besson has also amassed four world championship titles in the Nacra 17, forming a dynamic duo with Marie Riou. The skipper's serious back injury deprived the pair of their chance to vie for the Olympic title in Rio 2016 but, with unfinished business, the pair went back campaigning for Tokyo 2020. In 2018, whilst Riou was taking part in the Volvo Ocean Race, Besson was discovering offshore sailing for himself competing with two of France's most prestigious maxi-trimaran campaigns. (Sodebo with Thomas Coville / Banque Populaire with Armel le Cleac'h)

From 2018 to October 2021, Billy was part of SailGP, as the French skipper of Sail GP.

== Participation in Olympics ==
He competed at the 2016 Summer Olympics in Rio de Janeiro, in the mixed Nacra 17.The duo ended 6th.
