= Jan Shearer =

New Zealand sailor (born 1958)

Personal information
- Born: Janet Lee Shearer; 17 July 1958 (age 68) Dunedin, New Zealand
- Spouse: Murray Jones
- Relatives: Gemma Jones (daughter) one son
Medal record
Women's sailing
Representing New Zealand
World Championships
Silver medal – second place	1989 Tsu City	470
Summer Olympics
Silver medal – second place	1992 Barcelona	470

Janet Lee Shearer (born 17 July 1958) is a New Zealand sailor who competed for New Zealand at three Olympic Games and won a silver medal, with Leslie Egnot, at the 1992 Summer Olympics in Barcelona, in the women's 470 class.

Shearer and Egnot finished second in the 1989 470 Class World Championships in Japan, she was part of the New Zealand crew that won the 1990 World Women's Match Racing Championships in New York; Jan Shearer and Fiona Galloway competed for New Zealand at the 1988 Summer Olympics in Seoul in the 470W Class, this was the first time ever that women had their own event in sailing at the Olympic Games. They finished 9th overall. Shearer and Galloway also won the centennial (100 year anniversary) of 'Kiel Week' Germany in the 470W Class, in one of the largest fleets ever in women's dinghy sailing. Shearer and Egnot after winning the Silver Medal in 1992, competed again at 1996 Summer Olympics in Atlanta finishing 16th. Their competitiveness was hampered by an injury Egnot was carrying at the time.

She later married fellow international yachtsman Murray Jones, a six-time America's Cup-winning sailor and designer, and five-time New Zealand Olympian. She commentated for TVNZ and Team New Zealand VIPs during the 1995, 2000, 2003 America's Cup and 2021 America's Cup; and completed a Master of Business Studies (Management of Sport, Honors) at Massey University in 2002. while working as an engineer. Her daughter, Gemma, is a sailor and competed at the 2016 Summer Olympics finishing 4th.

Born in Dunedin in 1958, Shearer was educated at Otago Girls' High School and is a life member of Yachting NZ and Takapuna Boating Club. She was appointed to the Tennis NZ Board in 2012, in 2016 Shearer was elected to the board of Snow Sports NZ, and in 2017 to the Board of Canoe Racing NZ, subsequently as Chair, and Board member of Melanoma NZ. She spent 20 years working as a mechanical engineer as design consultant. She changed career in 2011 after living in Europe and spent 5 years as Head of Performance at Tennis NZ, then 3 years as CEO of Snow Sports NZ and is currently CEO of NZ Water Polo.
