= Murray Jones (sailor) =

New Zealand sailor

Murray Selwyn Jones (born 1957 in Lower Hutt) is a New Zealand sailor.

== Sailing career ==
Jones represented New Zealand in the Flying Dutchman class in 1988 and 1992 Summer Olympics. He was also selected for the 1976,1980, and 1984 Olympics in the 470 Class. Olympics Jones finished 5th in 1988 and 4th in 1992, alongside Greg Knowles.

Jones was part of Team New Zealand that won the America's Cup in 1995 and then defended the trophy in 2000. Jones was one of six prominent sailors who then left Team New Zealand and joined Alinghi, winning the 2003 America's Cup and 2007 America's Cup. Jones was inducted into the America's Cup Hall of Fame in 2010.

Along with Russell Coutts, Jones later joined Oracle Team USA and was involved in the 2013 America's Cup victory.

Jones re-joined Team New Zealand for the 2017 America's Cup. He has won the Americas Cup 6 times.

== Personal life ==
Jones married Olympic sailor and medalist Jan Shearer. His daughter, Gemma, is a sailor and competed in the 2016 Summer Olympics finishing 4th.
