= Jason Saunders =

New Zealand sailor (born 1990)

Jason Saunders (born 22 November 1990) is a New Zealand sailor.

Saunders was born in 1990 in Tauranga and received his education at Tauranga Boys' College that he attended with fellow Olympic sailors Sam Meech (born 1991) and Peter Burling (born 1991) at the same time.

Saunders competed in the 470 class at the 2012 Summer Olympics, with Paul Snow-Hansen. The team finished 5th.

At the 2016 Summer Olympics, Saunders competed alongside Gemma Jones in the Nacra 17 event, finishing in 4th. Previously the team had finished 4th at the 2015 Nacra 17 World Championships, and later finished in 4th place at the 2017 Nacra 17 World Championships. He now competed in the Nacra 17 event with Olivia Mackay.
