= Katie Dabson =

British sailor

- Born: c.1996
- Education: Plymouth University
- Occupation: sailor
- Known for: medal winning

Katie Dabson (born c.1996) is a British sailor in the catamaran Nacra 17 and the hydrofoil Formula Kite. She became World champion with Ben Saxton in 2017 at the Nacra 17 World Championship and then went on to compete at Formula Kite.

== Life ==
Dabson was born in about 1996. She went to Plymouth University where she graduated with honours in Accountancy and Finance. She had taken to sailing, after seeing the 2012 Olympic sailing in Weymouth. After being a student she decided to become a full-time sailor. Her father also sailed, he sailed with the father of her friend from Grafham Water Sailing Club, Ben Saxton. She and Saxton had success together as they competed at the Sailing World Cup Finals and at the European Championship in Germany. On both occasions they took medals.

She became World champion with Saxton in 2017 at the Nacra 17 World Championship in the seaside resort of La Grande-Motte. In 2017 he and Katie Dabson came second in the final race and won the Championship. The third place in the race and the second place in the championship was taken by Fernando Echavarri and Tara Pacheco.

She later won a bronze medal in 2020 as part of the Formula Kite Mixed Team Relay team at the European Championships.

She competed at the Formula Kite European Championships in 2022 in Portsmouth where she was 16th.

In 2023 she was training with four other "GB Kite Girls" in Weymouth. One of these was Ellie Aldridge who was chosen to represent the UK at the 2024 Olympics at Formula Kite. The "GB Kite Girls" were Ellie Aldridge, Maddy Anderson, Jemima Crathorne, Lily Young and Dabson and they were assisting Aldridge's training. Dabson was at the Formula Kite European Championships in Spain in March 2023 where she was ninth in a field dominated by French Olympic hopefuls.
