= Lou Berthomieu =

French competitive sailor

Personal information
- Nationality: French
- Born: 20 June 2001 (age 25)

Sport
- Sport: Sailing
- Club: S N O NANTES

Achievements and titles
- Olympic finals: 2024

Lou Berthomieu (born 20th June 2001) is a French olympic sailor.

In the 2024 Summer Olympics, held in her home country in the city of Marseille, she was crew for Tim Mourniac where they competed in the mixed multihull, finishing in 5th position overall.
