= Micah Wilkinson =

New Zealand sailor (born 1996)

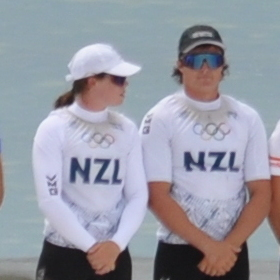
- Wilkinson (right) with Erica Dawson in 2024

Personal information
- Born: 6 February 1996 (age 30) Hamilton, New Zealand
- Height: 173 cm (5 ft 8 in)

Sailing career
- Sport: Sailing
- Club: Ngaroto Sailing Club
- Class: Nacra 17
Medal record
Sailing
Representing New Zealand
Olympic Games
Bronze medal – third place	2024 Paris	Nacra 17

Micah Wilkinson (born 6 February 1996) is a New Zealand sailor. He competed in the Multihull – Nacra 17 event at the 2020 Summer Olympics with Erica Dawson. He and Dawson competed again in the 2024 Summer Olympics where they won the bronze medal in the Nacra 17 event. Micah is now a pilot for the E1 Series Team Drogba, with a recent P3 podium finish with his team in Doha, Qatar (first race as a rookie)
