= Louisa Chafee =

American competitive sailor

Personal information
- Born: September 24, 1991 (age 34)

Sport
- Country: United States
- Sport: Sailing

Louisa Chafee (born September 24, 1991) is an American competitive sailor. She represented the United States at the 2016 Summer Olympics in Rio de Janeiro in the mixed Nacra 17, where she finished 8th overall. She is the daughter of former Rhode Island governor and senator Lincoln Chafee.
