= Gemma Jones (sailor) =

New Zealand sailor (born 1994)

Gemma Jones (born 7 January 1994) is a New Zealand sailor.

== Sailing career ==
Jones represented New Zealand at the 2012 and 2013 International Sailing Federation youth world championships, competing in the 420 and SL 16 catamaran (5th place) classes.

At the 2016 Summer Olympics, Jones competed alongside Jason Saunders in the Nacra 17 event finishing 4th and winning the medal race. Jones was the youngest and only female helm in the top 10 medal race at the Games. Jones and Saunders had multiple top 5 finishes at key international events. They finished fifth at the 2014 Nacra World Championships and fourth in the 2015 and 2017 Nacra World Championships, and 2nd at the 2018 European Championships. Jones was crew in the 2023 Ocean Race VO65 Sprint Series on the winning yacht WindWhisper. Jones is a crew member of the 2024 NZ Women's Americas Cup Team.

== Personal life ==
Her father, Murray, was an America's Cup sailor. He has won the Americas Cup 6 times and has been inducted into the Hall of Fame. Her mother Jan Shearer is a triple Olympian who won a silver medal at the 1992 Games in Barcelona in the 470 W Yachting Class.
