= Tara Pacheco =

Spanish sports sailor (born 1988)

Personal information
- Full name: Tara Pacheco van Rijnsoever
- Nationality: Spanish
- Born: 3 October 1988 (age 37) Arucas, Spain

Sailing career
- Sport: Sailing
Medal record
Women's sailing
Representing Spain
World Championships
Silver medal – second place	2017 La Grande-Motte	Nacra 17

Tara Pacheco van Rijnsoever (born 3 October 1988 in Arucas) is a Spanish professional sailor and four times olympian.

== Sailing career ==
=== Olympics ===
- 10 out of 20 in 2012 Women's 470 class with crew Berta Betanzos
- 11 out of 20 in 2016 Nacra 17 mixed multihull as crew for Fernando Echavarri
- 6 out of 20 in 2020 Nacra 17 mixed multihull with crew Florián Trittel
- 11 out of 19 in 2024 Nacra 17 mixed multihull with crew Andrés Barrio

=== World Championships ===
She was runner-up at the 2006 420 Female World Championships.

At the 2017 Nacra 17 World Championship, she and Echavarri won a silver medal. They were beaten by Ben Saxton and Katie Dabson She and Echavarri also won the silver medal at the 2017 European Championships.

=== Other Events ===
Pacjeco first teamed with Iker Martinez to win European Nacra 17 title in 2014.

== Personal life ==
Born in Spain, Pacheco is of Dutch descent through her mother.
