= Olivier Backes =

French sailor

Personal information
- Nationality: French
- Born: 26 April 1973 (age 51); Saint-Cyr-l'École, France

Sport
- Sport: Sailing

Olivier Backes (born 26 April 1973) is a French sailor. He competed in the Tornado event at the 2004 Summer Olympics, in Athens.
