= Ruggero Tita =

Italian sailor (born 1992)

Personal information
- Born: 20 March 1992 (age 34) Rovereto, Italy
- Height: 175 cm (5 ft 9 in)
- Weight: 71 kg

Sailing career
- Sport: Sailing
Medal record
Sailing
Representing Italy
Olympic Games
Gold medal – first place	2020 Tokyo	Nacra 17
Gold medal – first place	2024 Paris	Nacra 17
World Championships
Gold medal – first place	2018 Aarhus	Nacra 17
Gold medal – first place	2022 Halifax	Nacra 17
Gold medal – first place	2023 The Hague	Nacra 17
Gold medal – first place	2024 La Grande-Motte	Nacra 17
Bronze medal – third place	2017 La Grande-Motte	Nacra 17
European Championships
Gold medal – first place	2017 Kiel	Nacra17
Gold medal – first place	2018 Gydia	Nacra17
Gold medal – first place	2022 Aarhus	Nacra 17
Silver medal – second place	2011 Helsinki	49er
National Championship
Gold medal – first place	2005	Optimist
Gold medal – first place	2007	29er
Gold medal – first place	2008	49er
Gold medal – first place	2010	49er
Gold medal – first place	2011	49er
Gold medal – first place	2018	Nacra17
Silver medal – second place	2008	29er
Silver medal – second place	2012	49er
Bronze medal – third place	2016	Nacra17

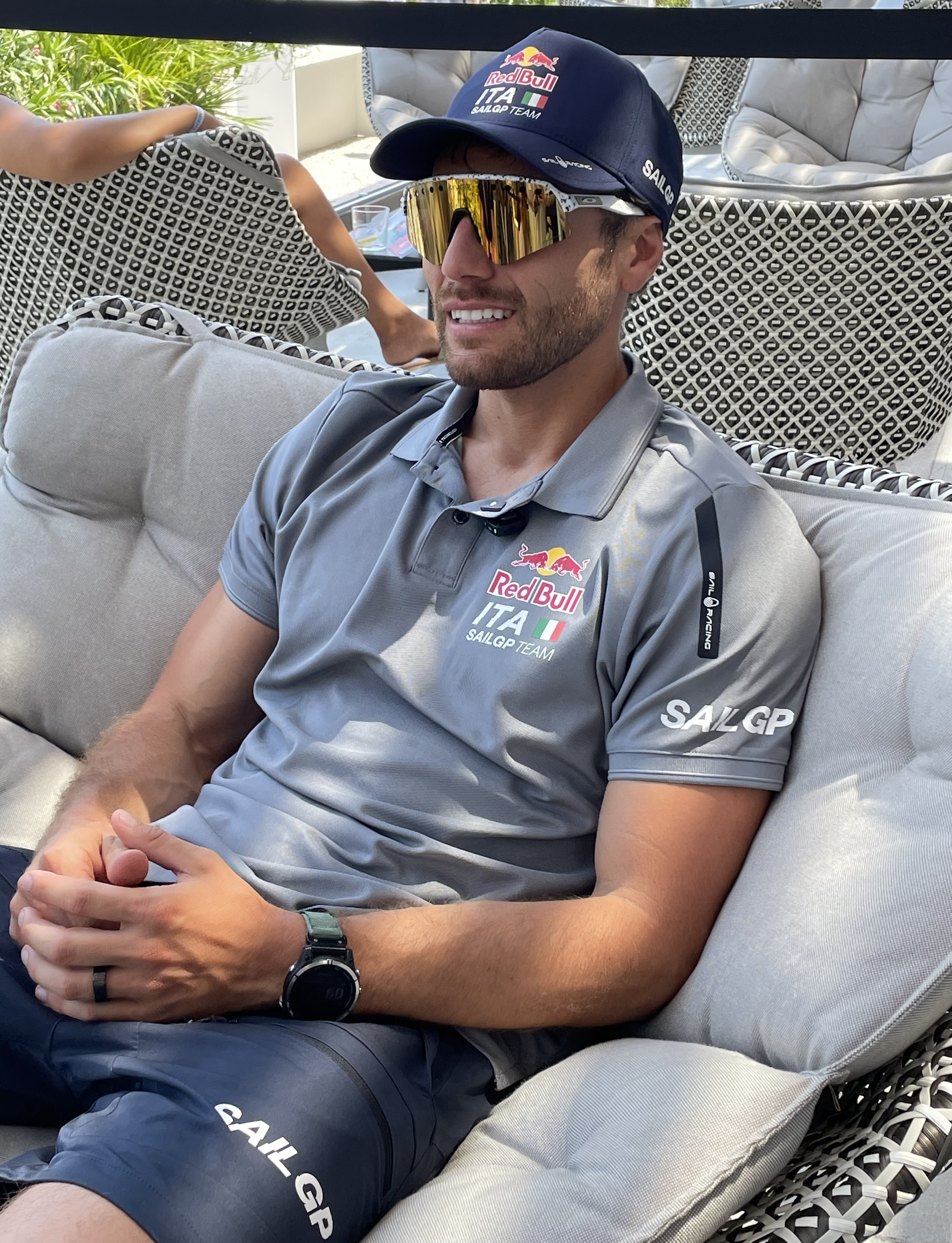
Ruggero Tita

Ruggero Tita (born 20 March 1992) is an Italian sailor. He competed at the 2020 Summer Olympics and 2024 Summer Olympics, with Caterina Banti, in Nacra 17, winning two gold medals.

From the age of 12 on the national team, he conquered the title of Italian champion in the Optimist class at 13 years old, later he became European Team race champion and Swiss Open champion. He competed in the 29er class and after a short period he moved on to the 49er class where he became an Italian champion.

In 2015, he won the Olympic Week on Lake Garda and subsequently the U23 Youth European Champion and the silver medal at the U23 Youth World Championship. Subsequently, with Pietro Zucchetti, represented Italy at the 2016 Summer Olympics in the 49er event.

Currently, he is combating in the Nacra 17 class where he won, with Caterina Banti, his second Olympic title at Paris 2024, after winning the gold medal at Tokyo 2020; Tita and Banti won a Bronze and a Gold in the World Championships, 2 consecutive European titles, 2 golds, 1 silver, and 1 bronze in the World Cup Series. They won the Olympic Test Event and currently they occupy the first place in the World Ranking.

Italian sailor of the year twice in a row and nominated for the Rolex Sailor of the Year award.

He collaborated with the Luna Rossa Prada Pirelli team in the 36th and 37th America's Cup but did not participate in the races.

Tita is the driver for Red Bull Italy SailGP Team in the SailGP league.

He has a degree in Computer Engineering from the University of Trento and is passionate about extreme sports such as kitesurfing, surfing, snowkiting, freeride, speedfly, paraglide, snowboarding, and freestyle skiing.

== Biography ==
=== Career ===
He began sailing at the age of 8–9 years at the Trentino sailing association.

==== Optimist ====
From 2005 he began to collect successes on the optimist and in 2007 he participated in the World Championship in Cagliari. Despite a brilliant start, he finished the world championship in 21st place.

==== 29er ====
In October of the same year, he competed for the first time in 29er with Takuya Gamboni. In 2008 he participated in the 29er national regattas obtaining excellent results, he also collected some good international results a 4th and a 6th place in the 2 stages of EuroCup in Cavalaire and Kiel. It ranks among the best 10 at the European in Medemblik (1st Italian) and among the top 10 in the world at the ISAF World Cup.

==== 49er ====
After just one year of 29er he moved to the 49er with his partner Nicolas Piccinelli and they competed in the Italian Olympic Class Championship managing to get on the Bronze medal. Regatta with Nicolò Fasoli since March 2009. 2009 season opens with a new crew, Matteo Gritti with whom he celebrates his 18th birthday by winning the national regatta that was held in those days and together they won the Italian title in 2010. In 2011 he competed in the 49er Youth World Championship with Lorenzo Franceschini and ended the season by winning the Italian Olympic Class Championship with Lorenzo Bianchini. In November 2011 he got the extraordinary opportunity to helm with Gianfranco Sibello. After a month of intense training in Loano they competed in the 49er World Championship, to qualify the Italy for 49er event at the 2012 Summer Olympics.

Despite they did not get the qualification, Ruggero did not give up and went back to the water with Sebastian Nulli at the World Cup Series in Palma de Majorca. During this event he met Gianluca Semeraro with whom he competed in the 2012 European Championships finishing 15th. After a short time in the kite world in March (2013) he returned to the 49er with Giacomo Cavalli, together they travel the world attending several international events including: Sail Sydney in 2013 (2nd), the Intergalactic Regatta (12th) and the South American Championship (11th) in Rio de Janeiro 2014, the Arenal Trophy in Palma del Majorca Spain (7th) and several stages of the Sailing World Cup.

In 2016 with Pietro Zucchetti represented Italy in 49er event at the 2016 Summer Olympics finishing in 14th place.

==== Nacra17 ====
After the Rio de Janeiro Olympics, he tried the Nacra 17 with Caterina Banti as crew. Together they got the 3rd place in the Italian Olympic Class Championship and following this result they started the Olympic campaign for Tokyo 2020 in Nacra. They immediately got excellent results, Bronze at the World Cup and Gold at the 2017 European Championship. In 2018 they confirmed the European title and won the World title.

==== SailGP ====
In November 2024, it was announced that Tita would take the driver position in the newly formed Red Bull Italy SailGP Team in Season 5 of the international league.
