= Tim Mourniac =

French competitive sailor

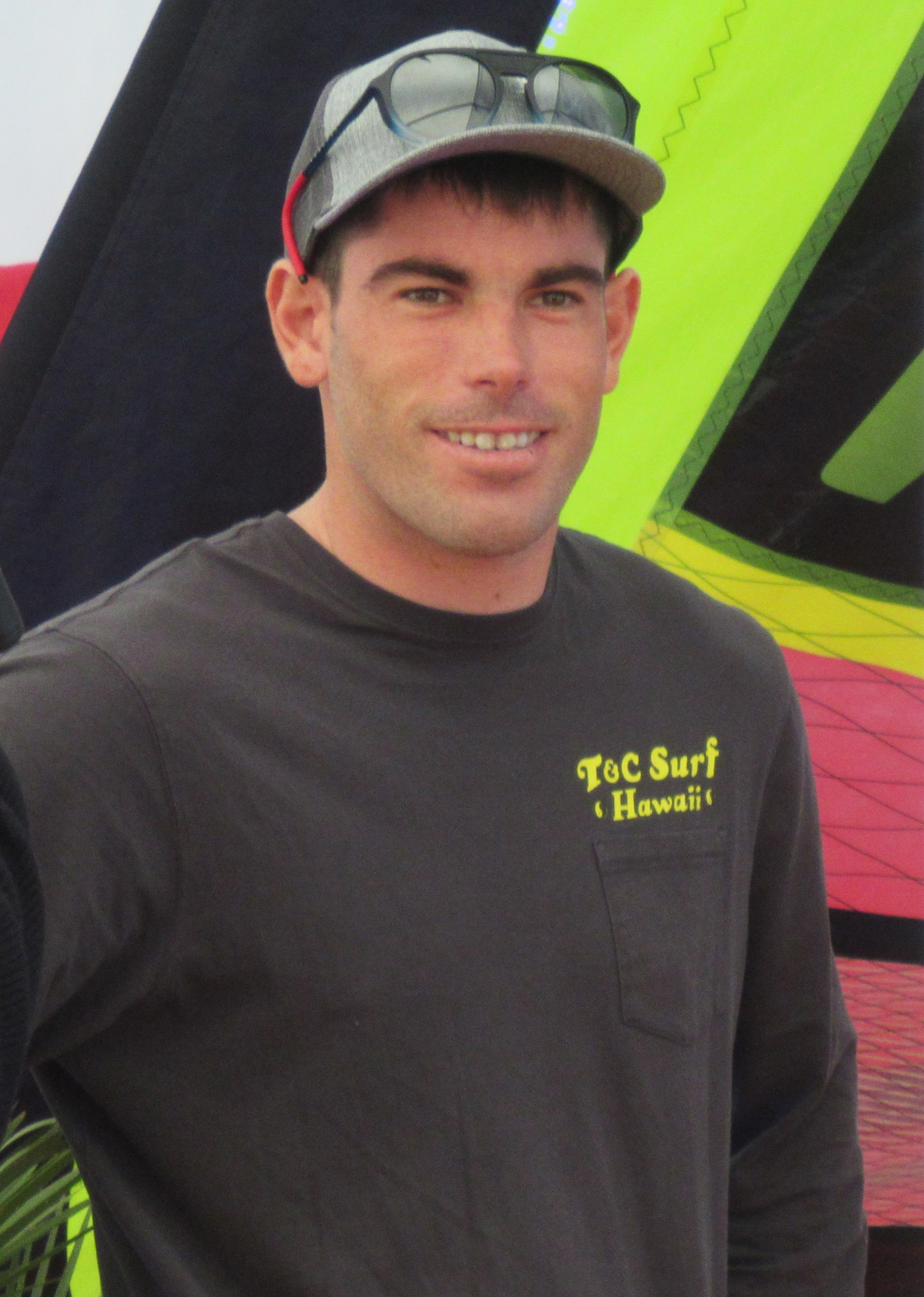

Personal information
- Nationality: French
- Born: 14 April 1998 (age 28)

Sailing career
- Country: France
- Sport: Sailing
- Club: ASN QUIBERON

Achievements and titles
- Olympic finals: 2024

Tim Mourniac (born 14th April 1998) is a French olympic sailor.

In the 2024 Summer Olympics, held in his home country in the city of Marseille, he was helm alongside crew Lou Berthomieu where they competed in the mixed multihull, finishing in 5th position overall.
