= Alica Stuhlemmer =

German sailor (born 1999)

Personal information
- Nationality: German
- Born: 24 August 1999 (age 26) Kiel, Schleswig-Holstein, Germany
- Height: 1.60 m (5 ft 3 in)

Sailing career
- Sport: Sailing
- Class: Nacra 17
Medal record
Women's sailing
Representing Germany
Olympic Games
Bronze medal – third place	2020 Tokyo	Nacra 17

Alica Stuhlemmer (born 24 August 1999, in Kiel) is a German sailor who lives in Altenholz. She represented Germany, along with partner Paul Kohlhoff, in the Nacra 17 class at the 2020 Summer Olympics in Tokyo, winning the bronze medal. At 22 years old, Alica was the youngest sailor to win a medal throughout all sailing disciplines in Tokyo.

In 2020, she and her partner were in tenth place in the European championship and eleventh in the World Championship.

== Career ==
She competed at the 2019 Hempel World Cup, 2019 World Championship, and 2020 World Championship.
