= Jason Waterhouse =

Australian sailor

Personal information
- Nationality: Australian
- Born: 8 November 1991 (age 34) Newport, New South Wales, Australia
- Height: 185 cm (6 ft 1 in)
- Weight: 75 kg (165 lb)

Sailing career
- Sport: Sailing
- Club: Royal Prince Alfred Yacht Club
- Class(es): Nacra 17, Formula 18, Foiling50, Hobie 16, Hobie Dragoon, Sirena SL16
Medal record
Sailing
Representing Australia
Olympic Games
Silver medal – second place	2016 Rio de Janeiro	Nacra 17
World Championships
Bronze medal – third place	2014 Santander	Nacra 17
Silver medal – second place	2015 Aarhus	Nacra 17
Bronze medal – third place	2019 Auckland	Nacra 17
Bronze medal – third place	2020 Geelong	Nacra 17

Jason Waterhouse (born 8 November 1991) is an Australian competitive sailor.

He competed at the 2016 Summer Olympics in Rio de Janeiro, in the mixed Nacra 17.

In March 2020 Waterhouse and fellow crew member Lisa Darmanin were selected to represent Australia at the 2020 Summer Olympics in Tokyo. They finished fifth just out of medal contention.
