= Coen de Koning (sailor) =

Dutch competitive sailor (born 1983)

Personal information
- Born: 5 April 1983 (age 43) Hoorn

Sport
- Country: Netherlands
- Sport: Sailing

Coen de Koning (born 5 April 1983) is a Dutch competitive sailor. He competed at the 2016 Summer Olympics in Rio de Janeiro, in the mixed Nacra 17.
