= Sinem Kurtbay =

Finnish Olympic sailor

Personal information
- Nationality: Finnish
- Born: 24 May 1991 (age 33); Savonlinna, Finland

Sport
- Sport: Sailing

Sinem Kurtbay (born 24 May 1991) is a Finnish sailor. She competed in the Nacra 17 event at the 2020 Summer Olympics alongside Akseli Keskinen.

== Early life ==
Born in Savonlinna, Finland, to a Finnish mother and Turkish father, Kurtbay lived in Turkey with her family until she moved back to Finland at the age of twelve.
