= Emil Järudd =

Swedish sailor

Personal information
- Full name: Emil Roland Hugo Järudd
- Nationality: Swedish
- Born: 27 April 1998 (age 28) Stockholm, Sweden

Sailing career
- Sport: Sailing
- Club: Royal Swedish Yacht Club
- Class(es): Optimist, Moth, Nacra 17, 49er, 29er
Medal record
Sailing
Representing Sweden
World Championships
Bronze medal – third place	2023 The Hague	Nacra 17

Emil Roland Hugo Järudd (born 27 April 1998) is a Swedish sailor in the Nacra 17 class, who became a bronze medallist at the 2023 Sailing World Championships.

== Career ==
As a youth sailor, Järudd competed in the 2011 and 2012 Optimist World Championship, finishing 8th in the latter. Järudd then continued to the 29er class and sailed the 2014 ISAF Youth Sailing World Championships, finishing 8th.

Järudd qualified to represent Sweden in the 2020 Tokyo Summer Olympics alongside Cecilia Jonsson, competing in the Nacra 17 event, where they ranked 14th.

In 2023, Järudd, together with Hanna Jonsson, won bronze at the 2023 Sailing World Championships in the Hague. In May 2024, Järudd was again chosen to represent Sweden, this time with Hanna Jonsson, and over Ida Svensson and Nicklas Dackhammar. In the Nacra 17 event, the Järudd–Jonsson pair finished 10th.

Järudd is a student of industrial engineering at the Royal Institute of Technology in Stockholm.
