= Akseli Keskinen =

Finnish sailor

Personal information
- Nationality: Finnish
- Born: 21 July 1999 (age 25)

Sport
- Sport: Sailing

Akseli Keskinen (born 21 July 1999) is a Finnish sailor. He competed in the Nacra 17 event at the 2020 Summer Olympics.
