= Paul Kohlhoff =

German sailor

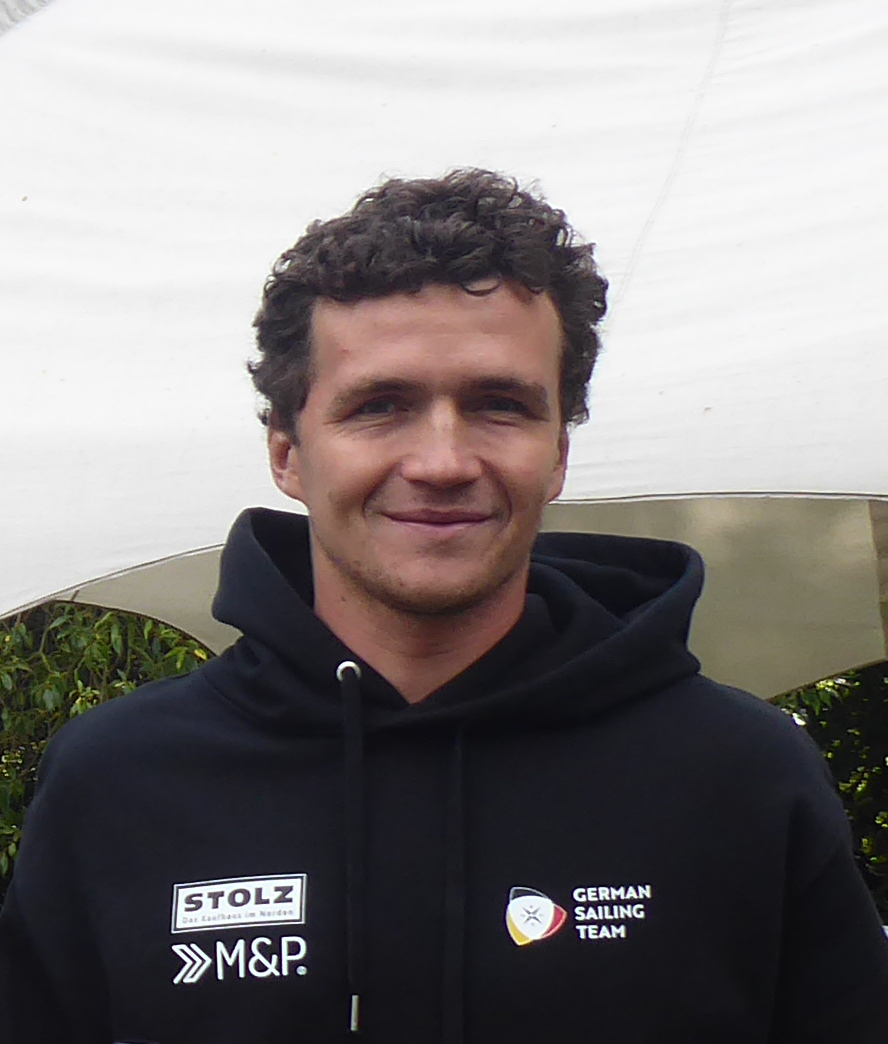
- Kohlhoff in 2022

Personal information
- Nationality: German
- Born: 26 June 1995 (age 31) Bremen, Germany
- Height: 1.87 m (6 ft 2 in)
- Weight: 83 kg (183 lb)

Sailing career
- Sport: Sailing
- Club: Kieler Yacht-Club
- Class(es): Nacra 17, 29er, J/70
Medal record
Men's sailing
Representing Germany
Olympic Games
Bronze medal – third place	2020 Tokyo	Nacra 17

Paul Kohlhoff (born 26 June 1995) is a German sailor. He represented Germany, along with partner Carolina Werner, in the Nacra 17 class at the 2016 Summer Olympics in Rio de Janeiro, and at the 2020 Summer Olympics, with Alica Stuhlemmer, winning the bronze medal.

== Career ==
He competed at the 2018 Hempel Sailing World Championships Aarhus, 2019 World Championships, and 2020 World Championships.

Kohlhoff receives novel funding targeted at German athletes by the German Sailing Association, like him and Leonie Meyer, who are parents.
