= Fernando Echávarri =

Spanish sailor

Medal record

Men's sailing

Representing Spain

Olympic Games
| Gold medal – first place | 2008 Beijing | Tornado class |

World Championships
| Gold medal – first place | 2005 La Rochelle | Tornado class |
| Gold medal – first place | 2007 Cascais | Tornado class |
| Silver medal – second place | 2017 La Grande-Motte | Nacra 17 |

Fernando Echávarri Erasun (born 13 August 1972) is a professional yachtsman in the Olympic Tornado class. Teaming with crew Antón Paz Blanco, he became the Spanish, European, World Champion, ISAF Sailor of the year in 2005, and Olympic gold medallist at the 2008 Summer Olympic Games held in Qingdao.

== Origins ==
Born and raised in Santander, Cantabria, Spain, Echávarri's family moved to Pontevedra, Galicia when he was five due to his father's medical practice as surgeon chief in the Montecelo Hospital. He has two brothers (Carlos and Javier) and one younger sister (Beatriz).

== Learning to sail ==
Echávarri first sailed in a 38 feet ketch at age eight and soon joined the local sailing school where he excelled in the Optimist fleet of the ria de pontevedra. His brothers and sister soon joined him and made sailing their common passion, racing regattas all over Spain and Portugal. Although his parents (Carlos and Beatriz) did not sail, they adapted their spare time and vacations to their kids racing calendar, always encouraging them to enjoy the sport. At age 15, Echávarri completed the Optimist class and entered the laser (dinghy) class sailing the standard rig while only 60 kg and 170 cm. Although only competitive in light conditions, he soon developed a special technique downwind that gave him fantastic results at a national level.

== Career ==
=== The Olympic endeavor ===
In 1992, at age 20, the International Sailing Federation chose the Laser (dinghy) as the new one-person dinghy to be competed in 1996 Summer Olympic Games. At that time, Echávarri had joined the Spanish military draft Servicio Militar in the Ejército de Tierra de España. It was in Spring 1993 that Echávarri successfully passed the trials to become a member in the Spanish Pre-Olympic Sailing Team Royal Spanish Sailing Federation, a position he held from 1992 to 1996. During these years he was second in the nationals in 1995 and 1996, but missed the final cut to represent Spain in the 1996 Summer Olympic Games. Although extremely competitive in light and mid air, his performance in windy conditions was not competitive enough. In order to enhance his competitiveness, he raced with a weighted jacket, developed a chronic back injury that partially healed and persist to this day.

=== Tornado sailing ===
In Spring 1997, Echávarri teamed with Antón Paz Blanco as crew to race in the Tornado Olympic catamaran at the 2000 Summer Olympic Games. The Tornado class is a two-person catamaran that achieves very high speeds. It was added in 1976 to the assortment of boats in the Olympic Event overseen by the International Sailing Federation. The Tornado was designed in the autumn of 1967 by Rodney March from England, with help from Terry Pierce, and Reg White, specifically for the purpose of being the new Olympic Catamaran, which was to be selected by the IYRU in an Olympic Catamaran Trials. The boat was developed mainly in Brightlingsea, England. The Tornado has since remained unchallenged as the ultimate one-design catamaran. Even more after several design updates have been introduced over the years. With its modern, stylish rigging and sleek lines the Tornado is quick to catch the eye of any water-drawn on-looker as it speeds across harbors, lakes, and oceans in over 40 countries around the world. With its ability to reach speeds of 14-16 knots upwind, and 33+ knots downwind or reaching, the Tornado is truly the purists' speed machine.

The early years in the Tornado class were hard. Having a limited budget, and lacking a technical background in catamarans, they concentrated in physical condition, sailing, maximizing resources, while learning the basics. During these early years, all economical resources come from Echávarri's parents who saw a total dedication on both sailors. However, slowly, the Royal Spanish Sailing Federation realized the potential of this duo. Importantly, good references from Tornado gold medalist and world champion Fernando León, his crew Pepote Ballester and the Tornado national coach Antonio Navarro, plus some promising results, promoted their presence in the National team. This brought them to a new level because León/Ballester were an international top team winning in 1996 Summer Olympic Games. In 2000, Echávarri and Antón were chosen as sparring (team B) in the Spanish Olympic sailing team for the 2000 Summer Olympic Games.

=== The 2004 Olympic campaign ===
Echávarri and Anton Paz represented Spain in the 2004 Summer Olympic Games. The conditions were difficult with a mix of light to strong winds with wild changes in direction. The gold medal winners were Roman Hagara and Hans Peter STEINACHER of Austria followed by the Americans Johnny Lovell and Charlie Ogletree. Hagara and Steniacher also won the gold medal in Sydney Australia. The Spanish team finished 8th place overall. However, this was the confirmation period with national institutions such as RFEV, FGV, Plan ADO, and private sponsors including Telefónica-Movistar helping their Olympic effort.

=== The 2008 Olympic campaign ===
With renewed energies, Echávarri and Paz started their 2008 Summer Olympic Games campaign winning the Tornado Spain nationals, Europeans (in Sweden), 2005 Tornado World Championship (in France), plus most of the Eurolympic circuit races. As a result, they were awarded with the Rolex-ISAF World Sailor of the Year in 2005. Although the year 2006 showed inconsistent results due to Echávarri racing some legs in the Volvo Ocean Race, the Tornado season was quite satisfactory with wins in the South America championship and 7th in the World's. Both races held in consecutive weeks in Buenos Aires Argentina. The season 2007 peaked in the ISAF-worlds in Cascais, Portugal where Echávarri and Paz become winners of this event for a second time. Importantly, they saved their passport to Beijing 2008. The sailing conditions in China were expected to be of marginal quality with strong currents and light shifty winds, however the championship end up being quite mixed with light winds and some strong conditions in the final races. Echávarri and Paz won the gold medal in the Tornado class. Out of the 11 races held, the duo won four races with a final score of 44 points. Getting the silver medal were Darren Bundock and Glenn Ashby of Australia with 49 points, and getting the bronze was Santiago Lange and Carlos Espinola of Argentina with 56 points.

=== The 2012 Olympic campaign ===
The Tornado class lost its Olympic status in early 2009. Therefore, after Echávarri completed the Volvo Ocean Race, he joined forces with new crew Fernando Rivero to challenge for the 2012 Summer Olympic Games in the veteran keeled star class. A rigorous physical training was essential to become a heavy crew, thus competitive results took a long time. The two Fernandos took the podium gold in the Open Europeans in Helsinki 2011. The coming 2012 Star World's in Hyères will reveal the final countries qualified for London 2012.

=== Offshore racing ===
Echávarri was given the opportunity of racing keeled boats at the Royal Sailing Club Sanxenxo where his reputation as a dinghy sailor in the early 90s was growing. It didn't take him long to shine among fellow competitors from the competitive Galicia's fleet winning numerous events. However, it was the pursuit of a career in the Olympics what minimized his apparitions in IMS sailing. It was after he signed for the Movistar sailing team that he got again in the IMS mediterranean circuit winning numerous events including Copa del Rey, European and world's titles. In 2006, the Movistar Volvo Ocean Race team included him in the crew to race the Rio de Janeiro-Baltimore, Baltimore-New York-Plymouth legs. Sadly, drama hit the New York-Plymouth stage due to structural damage in the keel system of the Movistar VOR70 that forced the crew to abandon ship when battling a North Atlantic storm. It was the courageous crew of ABN AMRO 2 who saved them from an uncertain fate in what may have been one of the most emotional moments in offshore sailing ever.

In 2008, Echávarri was named skipper of one of the two Spanish entries in the Volvo Ocean Race 2008–2009, Telefónica Black. The ten leg race started in Alicante Spain on 4 October with an inshore race, followed by the first leg from Alicante to Cape Town South Africa. Telefónica suffered structural damage to the rudder and finished the first leg in last place. In Leg 4, Telefónica Black experienced very rough headwinds and waves and a crack developed on the port side of the boat. Echávarri wisely withdrew from that leg and took refuge in the Philippines. The boat was later sent to Singapore and has been shipped to Rio de Janeiro for the start of Leg 6. The final legs of the Volvo Ocean Race saw a highly competitive Telefónica Black winning the final leg in the Baltic Sea from Stockholm to Saint Petersburg.

Volvo Round the World Ocean Race

- 2006 (crew) Movistar: Sank
- 2008-09 (skipper) Telefónica Black: Overall Standing 6th of 8 boats.

In 2021, Echávarri achieved monohull line honours in the Rolex Fastnet Race as skipper on board the 42.6m/140 ft ClubSwan 125 Skorpios.

== Olympics, world's, and continental championships ==
Star Europeans finishings

- 2011: 1st (Helsinki)Finland

Summer Olympics

- 2008: 1st (Beijing)China
- 2004: 8th (Athens) Greece
- 2000: Spanish Team B Australia

Tornado World's finishings

- 2007: 1st (Cascais) Portugal
- 2006: 6th (San Isidro) Argentina
- 2005: 1st (La Rochelle) France
- 2004: 4th (Palma de Mallorca) Spain
- 2003: 13th (Cádiz) Spain
- 2002: 12th (Martha's Vineyard) United States

Tornado Europeans finishings

- 2007: 12th (Palma de Mallorca) Spain
- 2006: 11th (Lübeck) Germany
- 2005: 1st (Västervik) Sweden
- 2004: 6th (Gran Canaria) Spain
- 2003: 6th (Cagliari) Italy
- 2002: 9th (Vilamoura) Portugal

Tornado North American finishings

- 2007: 3rd (Miami) United States
- 2006: 3rd (Miami) United States

Tornado South American finishings

- 2006: 1st (San Isidro) Argentina

Echávarri is the recipient of the Rolex World Sailor of the Year Award of 2005.
