= Vittorio Bissaro =

Italian competitive sailor

Personal information
- Nationality: Italian
- Born: 1 June 1987 (age 39)

Sport
- Sport: Sailing
- Club: Fiamme Azzurre

Vittorio Bissaro (born 1 June 1987) is an Italian competitive sailor.

He competed at the 2016 Summer Olympics in Rio de Janeiro, in the mixed Nacra 17 pairing with Silvia Sicouri at his bow. After sailing consistently throughout the qualification series, Bissaro-Sicouri dramatically lost one Olympic Medal in the Final race because of some major tactical mistakes and finished fifth overall.
