= John Gimson =

British sailor and Olympic medalist

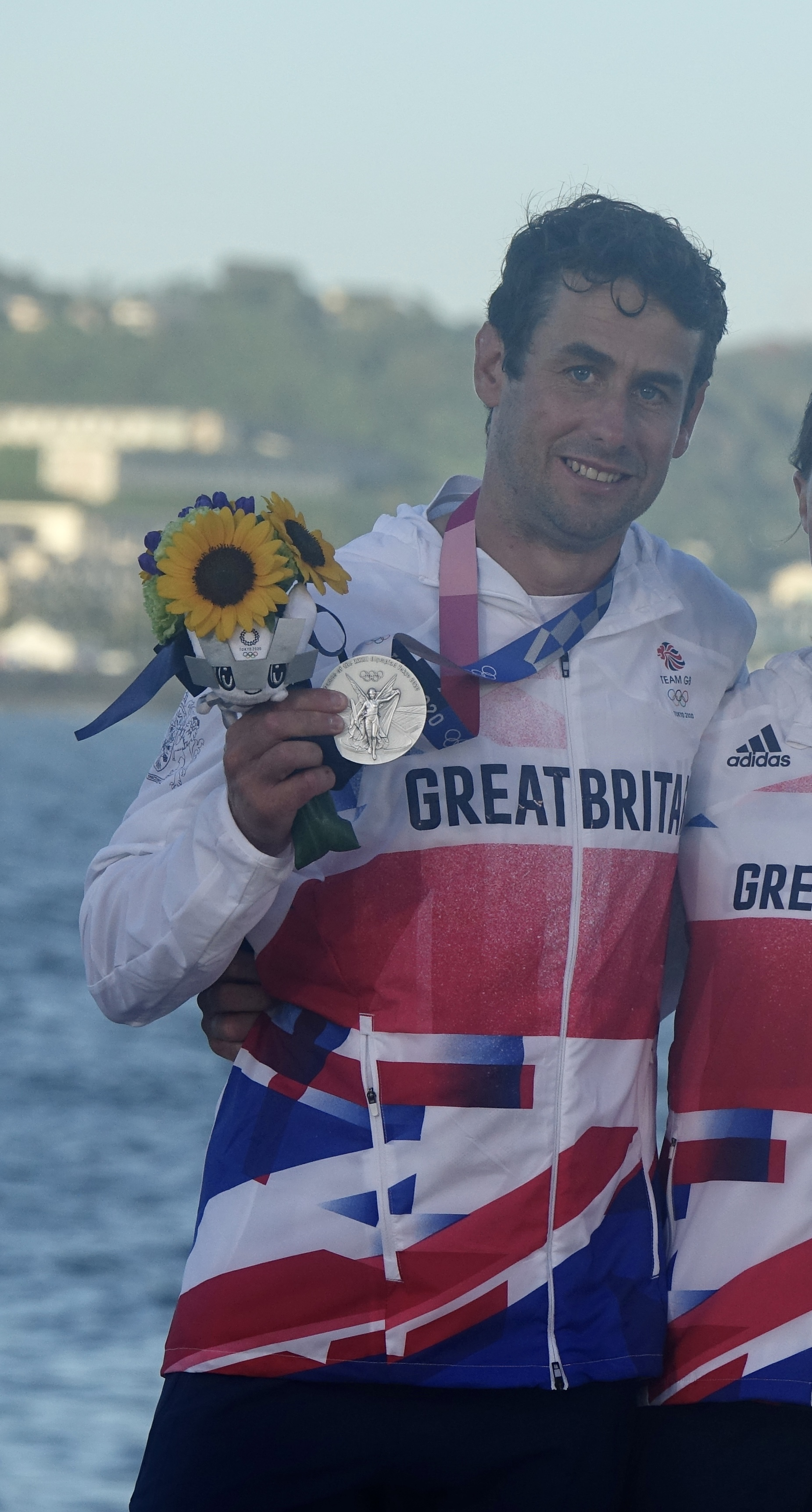
- Gimson in 2021

Personal information
- Nationality: British
- Born: 11 March 1983 (age 43) Leicester, England

Sailing career
- Sport: Sailing
- Club: Rudyard Lake
- Coached by: Iain Percy
- Class: Nacra 17
Medal record
Sailing
Representing Great Britain
Olympic Games
Silver medal – second place	Tokyo 2020	Nacra 17
World Championships
Gold medal – first place	2025 Cagliari	Nacra 17
Gold medal – first place	2021 Mussanah	Nacra 17
Gold medal – first place	2020 Geelong	Nacra 17
Silver medal – second place	2024 La Grande-Motte	Nacra 17
Silver medal – second place	2023 The Hague	Nacra 17
Silver medal – second place	2001 Kingston	Open 29er
Bronze medal – third place	2026 Quiberon	Nacra 17
European Championships
Gold medal – first place	2025 Thessaloniki	Nacra 17
Gold medal – first place	2023 Vilamoura	Nacra 17
Gold medal – first place	2021 Thessaloniki	Nacra 17
Gold medal – first place	2010 Italy	Etchells
Silver medal – second place	2026 Eckernförde	Nacra 17
Silver medal – second place	2019 Weymouth	Nacra 17
Silver medal – second place	2001 Alassio	29er

John Gimson (born 11 March 1983) is an Olympic silver medallist (Tokyo 2020 Olympic Games). He is 3x World champion and 3x European champion in sailings Mixed multihull Olympic discipline.

== Life ==
Gimson lives in Congleton.

Gimson's youth career yielded silver medals at the World and European Championships and a 2013 Americas Cup appearance, as well as eight years racing keelboats. Gimson joined Iain Percy and Andrew Simpson in 2012 as their training partner in the Star class for the Olympic cycle ahead of the London Games but the Star class was dropped as an Olympic event following 2012, leading to his eventual switch to Nacra 17.

He also competed in the Paris 2024 Olympic games narrowly missing out on a medal after a disqualification in the medal race, leaving him 4th.

Gimson competed in Tokyo alongside Anna Burnet with silver in the Nacra 17 class at the 2020 Games. The duo have won in Olympic medals and winning the World championships 3 times 2020/2021/2025. They have also won the European championships 3 times 2021,2023,2025.

He and Burnet would cap off a remarkable day for British sailing on the Olympic stage in Japan, making history winning a silver Medal, the first ever British team to do so in the Mixed multihull, which debuted at Rio 2016, and taking Britain's first medal in a multihull class since Reg White & John Osborn's gold medal in the Tornado at Montreal 1976.

He represented Team GB, along with partner Anna Burnet, in the Nacra 17 class at the 2020 Summer Olympics in Tokyo winning a silver medal. Gimson's World Championship success includes winning the 2020 Nacra 17 Worlds and 2nd place at the 29er World Championships.

In 2025 he and Anna Burnet won Gold at the Long Beach Olympic Sailing Grand Slam for the Nacra 17. They were well ahead of silver winners Laura Farese and Matthäus Zochling of Austria after winning two thirds of the fifteen races. Lukas Haberl and Clara Stamminger came in third place for the Bronze.
