= Lisa Darmanin (sailor) =

Australian sailor (born 1991)

Personal information
- Born: 27 August 1991 (age 34) Balgowlah Heights, New South Wales, Australia
- Height: 168 cm (5 ft 6 in)
- Weight: 65 kg (143 lb)
- Awards: Australian Female Sailor of the Year: 2015; 2016; 2020; 2021

Sailing career
- Sport: Sailing
- Club: Middle Harbour Yacht Club
- Coached by: Nacra 17, Hobie 16, Sirena SL16
Medal record
Olympic Games
Silver medal – second place	2016 Rio de Janeiro	Nacra 17
World Championships
Bronze medal – third place	2014 Santander	Nacra 17
Silver medal – second place	2015 Aarhus	Nacra 17
Bronze medal – third place	2019 Auckland	Nacra 17
Bronze medal – third place	2020 Geelong	Nacra 17

Lisa Darmanin (born 27 August 1991) is an Australian competitive sailor.

She won the Silver medal in the mixed Nacra 17 at the 2016 Summer Olympics in Rio de Janeiro.

In March 2020, Darmanin and fellow crew member Jason Waterhouse were selected to represent Australia for sailing at the 2020 Summer Olympics in Tokyo, where they placed fifth.

Darmanin was recognized by Australian Sailing as Australian Female Sailor of the Year in 2015, 2016, 2020, and 2021.

== Personal life ==
Darmanin is of Maltese descent. Her paternal grandparents immigrated to Australia from Malta in 1952 and were originally from Valletta and Marsaxlokk.
