= Ben Saxton (sailor) =

British competitive sailor (born 1990)

Personal information
- Nationality: British
- Born: 14 June 1990 (age 36)

Sailing career
- Sport: Sailing
Medal record
Men's sailing
Representing Great Britain
World Championships
Gold medal – first place	2017 La Grande-Motte	Nacra 17
Silver medal – second place	2013 The Hague	Nacra 17

Ben Saxton (born 14 June 1990) is a British competitive sailor.

He competed at the 2016 Summer Olympics in Rio de Janeiro, in the mixed Nacra 17. In 2017 he and Katie Dabson came second in the final race and as a result they won the Nacra 17 World Championship. The third place in the race and the second place in the championship was taken by Fernando Echavarri and Tara Pacheco.
