= Nacra 17 =

Olympic sailing class

Development
- Designer: Morrelli & Melvin, Nacra Sailing
- Year: 2011

Boat
- Crew: 2
- Displacement: 141 kg (311 lb)

Hull
- Type: Cat
- LOH: 5.25 m (17.2 ft)
- Beam: 2.59 m (8 ft 6 in)

Sails
- Mainsail area: 14.65 m^{2} (157.7 sq ft)
- Jib/genoa area: 4.0 m^{2} (43 sq ft)
- Gennaker area: 19.5 m^{2} (210 sq ft)

The Nacra 17 is a performance catamaran used for sailing. It was designed in 2011, went into production in 2012 and has been the focus of multihull sailing at the Olympic Games since its conception.

The Nacra has been converted to a sailing hydrofoil for the 2020 Tokyo and 2024 Paris (Marseille) Olympics.

== History ==
The Nacra 17 was specifically created to meet the criteria laid down for the new olympic discipline, a first for Olympic sailing a mixed crewed boat. In May 2012 International Sailing Federation chose the Nacra 17 as the equipment for the mixed multi hull at the 2016 Olympic Sailing Regatta and 2020 Summer Olympics in Tokyo.

Morrelli & Melvin, the boat's designers, summed up the design philosophy with the following quote:

The Formula 16 is on the small end of the scale for the crew weight range specified by ISAF (120 kg to 140 kg) and, in our opinion, would be more exciting and challenging to sail for Olympic-caliber sailors if it had a more powerful sail plan. The F18 typical crew weights exceed the range specified by ISAF. The F18 is also quite a heavy boat for its length and could be made lighter, but the hull volume and surface area would be needlessly large for a lighter Olympic spec F18 platform.

Since no existing design or class fit the ISAF specs, we decided to create an all-new design that is about 17 feet long, called the NACRA 17. Compared to an F16 class catamaran, it is 250mm longer, 100mm wider, has a taller mast and more sail area, and curved dagger boards.

The curved boards also give an added dimension to the sailing.

The ISAF Equipment Evaluation Panel wrote:

The clear preference of the MNA Sailors and the Evaluation Panel was the innovative new NACRA 17. Designed specifically for the Mixed Multihull criteria the Evaluation Panel concluded the NACRA 17 is seen as the best option. Featuring curved dagger boards providing vertical lift, the NACRA 17 will carry a wider –range of crew weight better than the 16 footers and is considerably lighter than a Formula 18. The modern NACRA 17 also offers the sailors in the Mixed Multihull Event the exciting challenge of mastering the potential lift of the curved daggerboards.

== Events ==
=== Olympics ===
Games	Gold	Silver	Bronze
2016 Rio de Janeiro	Argentina; Santiago Lange; Cecilia Carranza Saroli	Australia; Jason Waterhouse; Lisa Darmanin	Austria; Thomas Zajac; Tanja Frank
2020 Tokyo	Italy; Ruggero Tita; Caterina Banti	Great Britain; John Gimson; Anna Burnet	Germany; Paul Kohlhoff; Alica Stuhlemmer
2024 Paris	Italy; Ruggero Tita; Caterina Banti	Argentina; Mateo Majdalani; Eugenia Bosco	New Zealand; Micah Wilkinson; Erica Dawson
2028 Los Angeles			

== See also ==
- ISAF Sailing World Championships
- World Sailing
