= Skimmer =

Skimmer may refer to:

== Animals ==
- Skimmer (bird), a common name for birds in the genus Rynchops
- Skimmer (dragonfly), a common name for dragonflies in the family Libellulidae
- Water strider or skimmer, a common name for insects in the family Gerridae
- Atlantic surf clam or skimmer, a species of mollusc

== Other uses ==
- Skimmer (device), for getting data from a credit card for later fraudulent use
- Skimmer (machine), for removing oil from a water surface
- Skimmer (spa), for removing oil from spa and swimming pools water surface
- Protein skimmer or foam fractionator, a device used mostly in saltwater aquaria
- Skimmer (dinghy), an American sailboat design from 1933
- A type of hovercar in the Star Trek and other science fiction series
- Skimmer (hat)
- Skimmer (reader), in speed reading
- Skimmer (utensil), a flat, sieve-like scoop or spoon

== See also ==
- Skim (disambiguation)
- Skipper (disambiguation)
