= 2017 Youth Sailing World Championships – Boy's 420 =

Boy's 420 at the 2017 Youth Sailing World Championships
- Venue: Sanya, China
- Dates: 9–16 December

Medalists
| gold medal | Otto Henry; Rome Featherstone | Australia |
| silver medal | Thomas Rice; Trevor Bornarth | United States |
| bronze medal | Ido Bilik; Noam Homri | Israel |

The boy's 420 competition at the 2017 Youth Sailing World Championships took place in Sanya, China, between 9 and 16 December 2017. Otto Henry and Rome Featherstone of the Australia won the event.

== Results ==
| Pos | Helm | Crew | Country | R1 | R2 | R3 | R4 | R5 | R6 | R7 | R8 | R9 | Total | Nett |
|---|---|---|---|---|---|---|---|---|---|---|---|---|---|---|
| 1 | Otto Henry | Rome Featherstone | Australia | 4 | 2 | 2 | 1 | (15) | 13 | 1 | 11 | 3 | 52 | 37 |
| 2 | Thomas Rice | Trevor Bornarth | United States | 3 | 9 | 1 | 5 | 9 | 4 | 2 | 10 | (11) | 54 | 43 |
| 3 | Ido Bilik | Noam Homri | Israel | 2 | 1 | 9 | 15 | 1 | 3 | 6 | (18) | 9 | 64 | 46 |
| 4 | Enzo Balanger | Gaultier Tallieu | France | 8 | (21) | 7 | 4 | 13 | 1 | 7 | 5 | 2 | 68 | 47 |
| 5 | Rasim Yasar | Atil Api | Turkey | 7 | (20) | 16 | 2 | 10 | 10 | 3 | 6 | 12 | 86 | 66 |
| 6 | Yannis Saje | Lukas Haberl | Austria | 13 | 8 | 6 | 17 | 5 | 19 | 5 | (20) | 1 | 94 | 74 |
| 7 | Nicolas Radovitzky | Martin Radovitzky | Uruguay | 17 | 6 | 8 | 12 | (18) | 2 | 9 | 16 | 4 | 92 | 74 |
| 8 | Ramiro Cosentino | Agustin Frers De Anchorena | Argentina | 11 | 10 | 15 | (16) | 4 | 7 | 11 | 8 | 8 | 90 | 74 |
| 9 | Seweryn Wysokinski | Mateusz Jankowski | Poland | 1 | 22 | 3 | 9 | 6 | 16 | 17 | 1 | (25) | 100 | 75 |
| 10 | Edoardo Ferraro | Francesco Orlando | Italy | 9 | 14 | 12 | 11 | (22) | 14 | 14 | 4 | 6 | 106 | 84 |
| 11 | Andre Fiuza | Erik-Gunnar Rebelo Hoffmann | Brazil | 14 | 11 | (20) | 3 | 19 | 8 | 20 | 2 | 10 | 107 | 87 |
| 12 | Carlos Balaguer | Antoni Massanet Ramis | Spain | 16 | 5 | 4 | 21 | 2 | 12 | 10 | (27 RET) | 19 | 116 | 89 |
| 13 | Nick Zeltner | Till Seger | Switzerland | (27 DNF) | 3 | 13 | 18 | 3 | 25 | 4 | 19 | 7 | 119 | 92 |
| 14 | Patrick Wilson | Arie Moffat | Canada | 10 | 16 | 14 | 8 | 14 | 5 | 19 | 9 | (21) | 116 | 95 |
| 15 | Shinnosue Hachisuka | Benkei Kano | Japan | 5 | 15 | 10 | 14 | 8 | 9 | 15 | 21 | (24) | 121 | 97 |
| 16 | João Tomás Colaço Bolina | Rafael Rodrigues | Portugal | 12 | 4 | 5 | 19 | 7 | 22 | (27 UFD) | 3 | 27 UFD | 126 | 99 |
| 17 | Alex Smallwood | Ross Thompson | United Kingdom | 6 | 18 | 21 | 6 | (23) | 11 | 13 | 15 | 14 | 127 | 104 |
| 18 | Changhang Fan | Zinan Li | China | 15 | 12 | 19 | 10 | 11 | 6 | 18 | 13 | (22) | 126 | 104 |
| 19 | James Barnett | Sam Street | New Zealand | 21 | (24) | 17 | 7 | 12 | 17 | 12 | 12 | 16 | 138 | 114 |
| 20 | Wonbin Choi | Woojin Kim | South Korea | (27 UFD) | 7 | 18 | 24 | 16 | 18 | 16 | 7 | 17 | 150 | 123 |
| 21 | Geoff Power | James McCann | Ireland | 18 | 19 | 22 | 20 | (24) | 20 | 8 | 14 | 5 | 150 | 126 |
| 22 | Benji Daniel | Rivaldo Arendse | South Africa | 19 | 17 | 23 | 13 | 17 | (24) | 24 | 17 | 15 | 169 | 145 |
| 23 | Evgenii Chesov | Akim Papyshev | Russia | 20 | 13 | 24 | 23 | 25 | 21 | (27 UFD) | 23 | 13 | 189 | 162 |
| 24 | Benjamin Fuenzalida | Marcos Fuentes | Chile | 23 | 23 | (26) | 22 | 20 | 15 | 21 | 24 | 20 | 194 | 168 |
| 25 | Ping-Yu Cheng | Hsiu-Fung Chiang | Chinese Taipei | (27 DNF) | 25 | 11 | 27 DSQ | 26 | 26 | 22 | 22 | 18 | 204 | 177 |
| 26 | Jose Aguilera Palacios | Bruno Acierno | Mexico | 22 | (26) | 25 | 25 | 21 | 23 | 23 | 25 | 23 | 213 | 187 |
