= 2017 Youth Sailing World Championships – Girl's RS:X =

Girl's RS:X at the 2017 Youth Sailing World Championships
- Venue: Sanya, China
- Dates: 9–16 December
- Competitors: 19 from 19 nations

Medalists
gold medal	Emma Wilson	Great Britain
silver medal	Giorgia Speciale	Italy
bronze medal	Ting Yu	China

The girl's RS:X competition at the 2017 Youth Sailing World Championships took place between 9 and 16 December. 19 sailors from 19 nations were due to compete. Britain's Emma Wilson won the event.

== Results ==
Pos	Helm	Country	R1	R2	R3	R4	R5	R6	R7	R8	R9	R10	R11	R12	R13	Total	Nett
1st	Emma Wilson	United Kingdom	2.0	1.0	3.0	2.0	3.0	(4.0)	2.0	2.0	1.0	1.0	3.0	3.0	1.0	28.0	24.0
2nd	Giorgia Speciale	Italy	3.0	2.0	(4.0)	1.0	1.0	1.0	3.0	3.0	2.0	3.0	2.0	1.0	2.0	28.0	24.0
3rd	Ting Yu	China	1.0	3.0	1.0	(5.0)	2.0	5.0	4.0	1.0	4.0	2.0	1.0	2.0	3.0	34.0	29.0
4th	Yarden Isaak	Israel	4.0	4.0	2.0	(10.0)	10.0	3.0	1.0	4.0	3.0	8.0	4.0	4.0	4.0	61.0	51.0
5th	Mariana Aguilar	Mexico	(9.0)	6.0	8.0	4.0	6.0	6.0	5.0	5.0	5.0	7.0	5.0	6.0	6.0	78.0	69.0
6th	Rina Niijima	Japan	5.0	(13.0)	7.0	3.0	4.0	2.0	8.0	11.0	8.0	5.0	6.0	5.0	8.0	85.0	72.0
7th	Lidia Sulikowska	Poland	8.0	7.0	6.0	7.0	5.0	10.0	6.0	8.0	9.0	6.0	9.0	(14.0)	10.0	105.0	91.0
8th	Sandy Choi Wing Chi	Hong Kong	6.0	11.0	5.0	13.0	8.0	16.0	7.0	12.0	7.0	(20.0 UFD)	7.0	9.0	7.0	128.0	108.0
9th	Olivia Rosique	France	(12.0)	10.0	9.0	12.0	11.0	9.0	12.0	7.0	11.0	4.0	8.0	12.0	5.0	122.0	110.0
10th	Maria Lemenkova	Russia	7.0	9.0	(20.0 UFD)	9.0	12.0	7.0	9.0	6.0	12.0	12.0	10.0	7.0	11.0	131.0	111.0
11th	Larissa Schenker	Brazil	11.0	5.0	11.0	6.0	(14.0)	14.0	13.0	9.0	6.0	11.0	11.0	8.0	12.0	131.0	117.0
12th	Helle Oppedal	Norway	13.0	8.0	15.0	8.0	9.0	11.0	11.0	13.0	10.0	(20.0 UFD)	15.0	15.0	14.0	162.0	142.0
13th	Palma Cargo	Croatia	10.0	15.0	12.0	15.0	7.0	8.0	14.0	10.0	15.0	(20.0 UFD)	20.0 UFD	13.0	13.0	172.0	152.0
14th	Derin Gunenc	Turkey	15.0	12.0	10.0	11.0	13.0	13.0	15.0	18.0	13.0	9.0	(20.0 UFD)	10.0	15.0	174.0	154.0
15th	Veerle Ten Have	New Zealand	14.0	16.0	(20.0 UFD)	17.0	16.0	12.0	10.0	14.0	16.0	10.0	13.0	17.0	9.0	184.0	164.0
16th	Chih-Ling Wang	Chinese Taipei	(17.0)	14.0	13.0	16.0	15.0	15.0	16.0	16.0	14.0	13.0	14.0	11.0	16.0	190.0	173.0
17th	Dominique Stater	United States	18.0	19.0	16.0	14.0	18.0	17.0	(20.0 UFD)	15.0	17.0	14.0	12.0	16.0	20.0 UFD	216.0	196.0
18th	Hailey Lea	Australia	16.0	18.0	14.0	18.0	17.0	18.0	17.0	17.0	18.0	15.0	16.0	18.0	(20.0 DNF)	222.0	202.0
19th	Eunbin Choi	South Korea	19.0	17.0	(20.0 UFD)	19.0	19.0	19.0	18.0	20.0 DNF	19.0	16.0	17.0	19.0	20.0 DNF	242.0	222.0
