= 2017 Youth Sailing World Championships – Nacra 15 =

Nacra 15 at the 2017 Youth Sailing World Championships
- Venue: Sanya, China
- Dates: 9–16 December
- Competitors: 46 from 18 nations

Medalists
gold medal	Max Wallenberg; Amanda Bjork-Anastassov	Switzerland
silver medal	Shannon Dalton; Jayden Dalton	Australia
bronze medal	Lucas Claeyssens; Anne Vandenberghe	Belgium

The Nacra 15 competition at the 2017 Youth Sailing World Championships took place from 9 to 16 December. 36 sailors from 18 nations were due to compete. Max Wallenberg and Amanda Bjork-Anastassov of Switzerland won the event.

== Results ==
Pos	Helm	Crew	Country	R1	R2	R3	R4	R5	R6	R7	R8	R9	R10	R11	R12	R13	Total	Nett
1	Max Wallenberg	Amanda Bjork-Anastassov	Switzerland	3.0	3.0	5.0	5.0	1.0	8.0	3.0	5.0	7.0	(11.0)	6.0	6.0	5.0	68.0	57.0
2	Shannon Dalton	Jayden Dalton	Australia	2.0	(13.0)	2.0	4.0	3.0	5.0	9.0	11.0	4.0	2.0	2.0	5.0	8.0	70.0	57.0
3	Lucas Claeyssens	Anne Vandenberghe	Belgium	1.0	2.0	1.0	7.0	5.0	3.0	12.0	2.0	(15.0)	7.0	15.0	1.0	6.0	77.0	62.0
4	Mark Brunsvold	Dylan Heinz	United States	5.0	1.0	6.0	6.0	11.0	2.0	(15.0)	8.0	10.0	4.0	1.0	3.0	10.0	82.0	67.0
5	Bjarne Bouwer	Eliott Savelon	Netherlands	6.0	9.0	7.0	8.0	4.0	12.0	2.0	3.0	13.0	3.0	(16.0)	4.0	1.0	88.0	72.0
6	Greta Stewart	Henry Haslett	New Zealand	(14.0)	6.0	8.0	11.0	6.0	6.0	5.0	1.0	11.0	10.0	5.0	2.0	2.0	87.0	73.0
7	Silas Mühle	Romy Mackenbrock	Germany	4.0	4.0	10.0	1.0	2.0	9.0	8.0	6.0	3.0	(15.0)	10.0	12.0	12.0	96.0	81.0
8	Alessandro- Cesarini	Flavia Saveriano	Italy	13.0	10.0	3.0	12.0	(14.0)	4.0	6.0	9.0	8.0	9.0	8.0	8.0	3.0	107.0	93.0
9	Tymoteusz Cierzan	Oskar Niemira	Poland	8.0	12.0	11.0	13.0	9.0	7.0	1.0	12.0	1.0	13.0	(19.0 UFD)	11.0	4.0	121.0	102.0
10	Sophia Meyers	Teck-Pin Chia	Singapore	7.0	8.0	4.0	(18.0)	8.0	11.0	7.0	14.0	5.0	5.0	9.0	13.0	11.0	120.0	102.0
11	Helen Horangic	Theodora Horangic	Canada	(16.0)	7.0	14.0	3.0	12.0	1.0	10.0	15.0	9.0	1.0	11.0	7.0	14.0	120.0	104.0
12	Doran Gouron	Axel Nicoleau	France	15.0	16.0	9.0	10.0	10.0	(19.0 DSQ)	4.0	10.0	12.0	6.0	7.0	10.0	13.0	141.0	122.0
13	Lucas Videla	Agustina Castro Fau	Argentina	9.0	15.0	15.0	2.0	7.0	13.0	11.0	7.0	(18.0)	8.0	13.0	14.0	9.0	141.0	123.0
14	Benno Marstaller	Chloe Collenette	United Kingdom	12.0	(18.0)	17.0	9.0	15.0	14.0	14.0	4.0	6.0	12.0	4.0	9.0	7.0	141.0	123.0
15	Ying Dong	Yingying Zhang	China	11.0	5.0	16.0	14.0	13.0	15.0	13.0	16.0	14.0	16.0	3.0	18.0	(19.0 DSQ)	173.0	154.0
16	Emil Kjaer	William Johannesen	Denmark	10.0	11.0	12.0	15.0	16.0	10.0	16.0	17.0	17.0	(18.0)	14.0	15.0	16.0	187.0	169.0
17	Carlos-Eduardo Lopes	Lucas Ürményi	Brazil	(19.0 DNF)	14.0	13.0	16.0	17.0	17.0	17.0	13.0	2.0	17.0	12.0	17.0	15.0	189.0	170.0
18	Henrik Schrader Bordal	Celia Valeur Borresen	Norway	(19.0 DNF)	17.0	18.0	17.0	18.0	16.0	18.0	18.0	16.0	14.0	17.0	16.0	17.0	221.0	202.0
