= Petty officer =

Military rank

A petty officer (PO) is a non-commissioned officer in many navies. They are superior to a seaman, and subordinate to more senior non-commissioned officers, such as chief petty officers.

Petty officers are usually sailors that have served at least several years in their respective navies. Petty officers represent the junior and mid-grade non-commissioned officer ranks of many naval services, and are generally responsible for the day-to-day supervision of ranks junior to them. They may also serve as technical specialists within their rating (military occupation).

== Origin ==
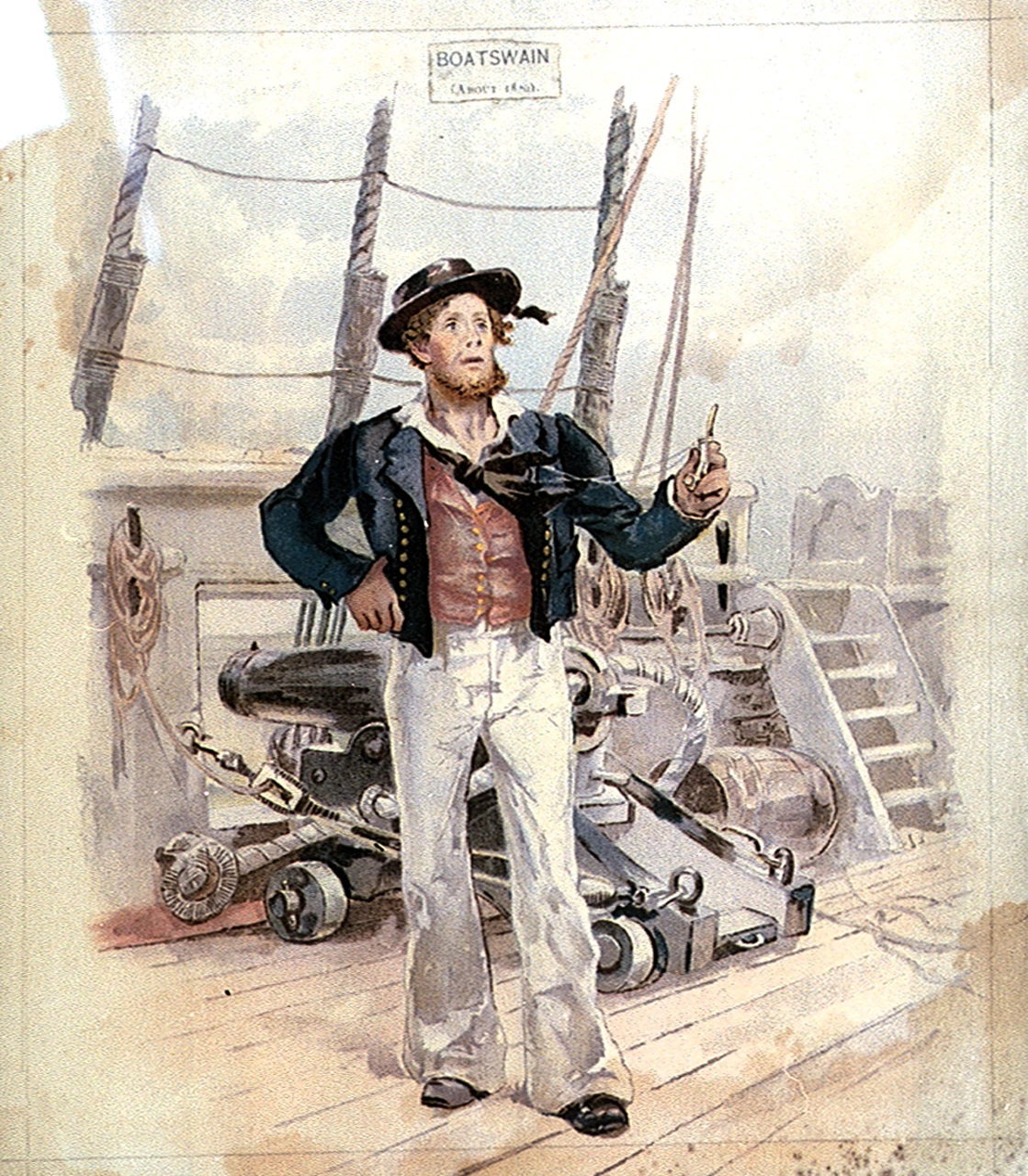
A Royal Navy boatswain's mate in 1820

The modern petty officer dates back to the Age of Sail in the Royal Navy. Petty officers rank between naval officers (both commissioned and warrant) and most enlisted sailors. These were men with some claim to officer rank, sufficient to distinguish them from ordinary ratings, without raising them so high as the sea officers. Several were warrant officers, in the literal sense of being appointed by warrant, and like the warrant sea officers, their superiors, they were usually among the specialists of the ship's company. The Oxford English Dictionary suggests that the title derives from the Anglo-Norman and Middle French "petit", meaning "of small size, small, little".

Two of the Royal Navy petty officer's rates, midshipman and master's mate, were a superior petty officer with a more general authority, but they remained no more than ratings. However, it was quite possible for a warrant officer (such as the armourer), in his role as a superior officer, to be court-martialed for striking a midshipman. This is because the midshipman was regarded as future sea officer, with the all-important social distinction of having the right to walk the quarterdeck. Midshipmen wore distinctive uniforms, master's mates dressed respectably, and both behaved like officers. The master's mate rating evolved into the rank of sub-lieutenant, and midshipman evolved into naval cadet. In the same administrative reforms of the 1860s that created the rank of Sub-lieutenant, two grades of Petty Officer were established for senior ratings — Petty Officer Second Class and Petty Officer First Class, the latter usually being achieved by men who had served as a PO 2nd Class with good conduct for six years. PO2s wore 'square rig' (the traditional sailor suit worn by junior ratings) while PO1s wore 'fore and aft' rig like chief petty officers and above. PO2s wore insignia of a fouled anchor (as for leading hands) but surmounted by a crown, while the insignia of a PO1 was a pair of crossed fouled anchors with a crown. The rank of Petty Officer Second Class was abolished in 1907 and the rank simply being titled as Petty Officer from then, with the uniform and insignia formerly used by PO1s.

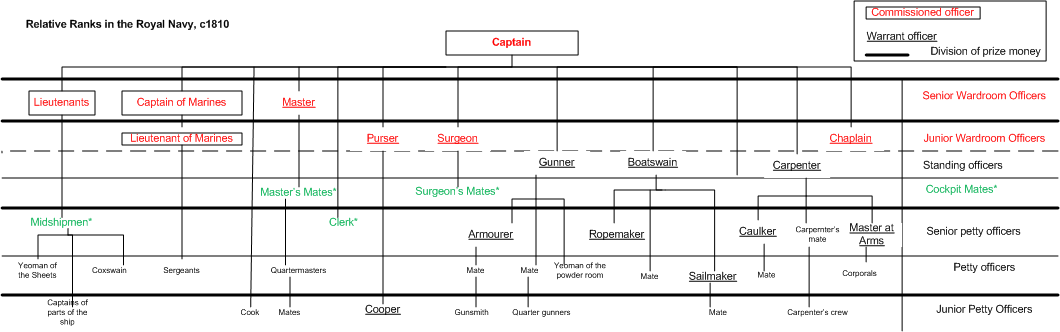
Relative Ranks in the Royal Navy, c. 1810

== Grades ==
- Petty officer third class
- Petty officer second class
- Petty officer first class
- Chief petty officer
- Senior chief petty officer
- Master chief petty officer

== Usage in navies ==
=== Canada ===
There are two petty officer ranks in the Royal Canadian Navy. Petty officer, 2nd class (PO2) (maître de deuxième classe or m2 in French) is equivalent to a sergeant and petty officer, 1st class (PO1) (maître de première classe or m1) is equivalent to a warrant officer.

Petty officers are normally addressed as "Petty Officer Bloggins" or "PO Bloggins", thereafter as "PO". The "1st class" and "2nd class" designations are normally only used when such a distinction needs to be made, such as on a promotion parade or to distinguish two petty officers with similar names but different ranks. The NATO rank denotion for "petty officer, 2nd class" is OR-6 (petty officers, 2nd class with less than 3 years seniority are considered OR-5). The NATO rank denotion for "petty officer, 1st class" is OR-7.

=== India ===
A petty officer is a non-commissioned officer in the Indian Navy, equivalent to the NATO rank enlisted grade of OR-6. They are equal in rank to a sub inspector of police in the Police, or havildar in the Indian Army and sergeant in the Indian Air Force. A petty officer is superior in rank to a leading rate and subordinate to a chief petty officer, as is the case in the majority of Commonwealth navies.

A petty officer has the ability to work as a leader, capable of taking charge of a group of personnel, and taking roles in the training and recruitment of new members of the Indian Navy.

=== United Kingdom ===
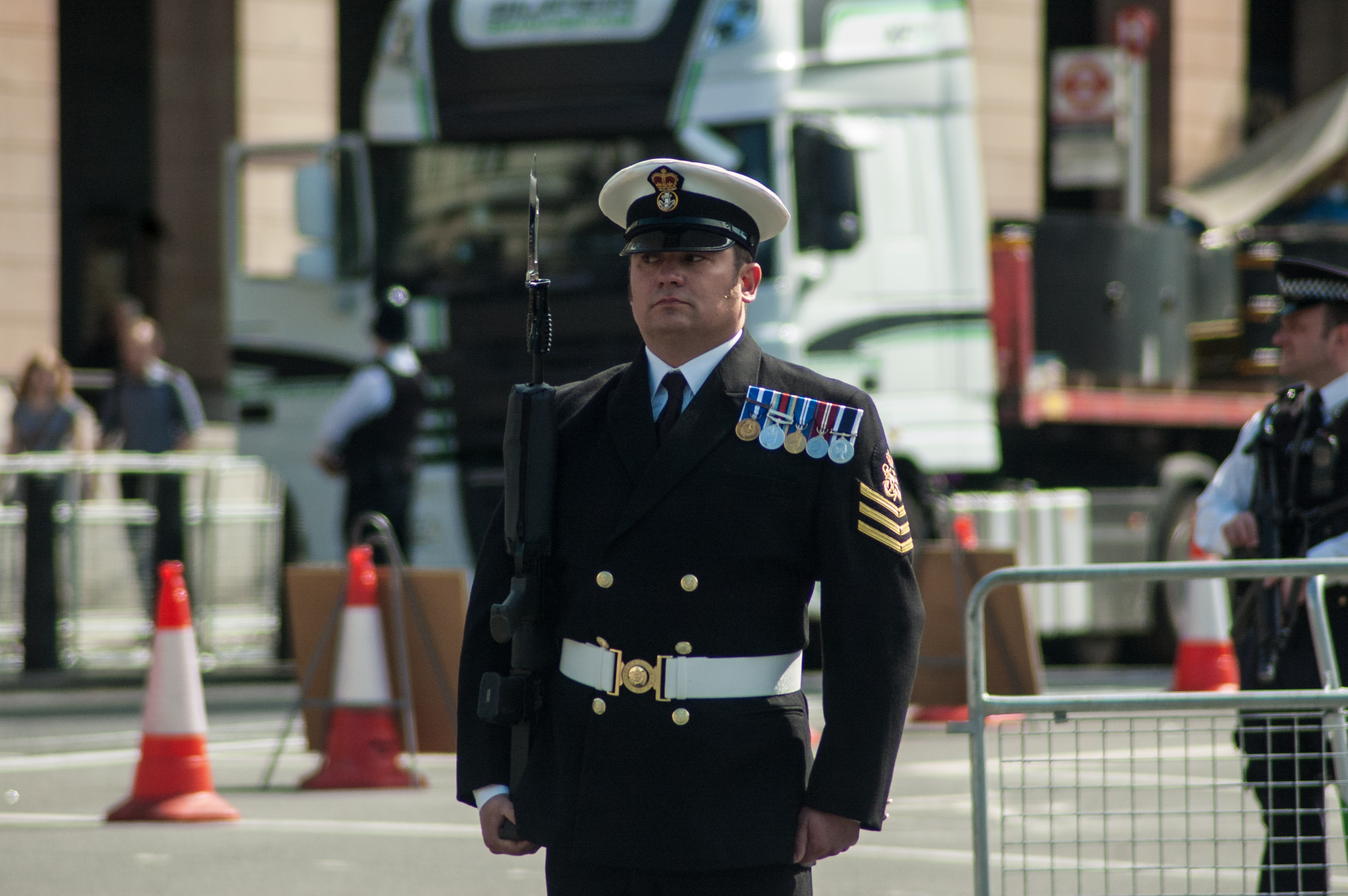
A petty officer of the Royal Navy on parade in London in 2015. Gold chevrons on the left arm represent good conduct, each one representing 4 years of service. After 15 years of service, with no breaks in good conduct, the individual is presented with their Long Service & Good Conduct Medal (nicknamed in the RN as Long Service & Undetected Crime Medal) it is the medal on the far right of this Petty Officer's row of medals.

In the Royal Navy, the rate of petty officer comes above that of leading rating and below that of chief petty officer. It is the equivalent of sergeant in the Royal Marines, British Army and Royal Air Force. Petty officer is the lowest of the senior rating grades. Petty officers, like all senior rates, wear "fore and aft" rig.

=== United States ===
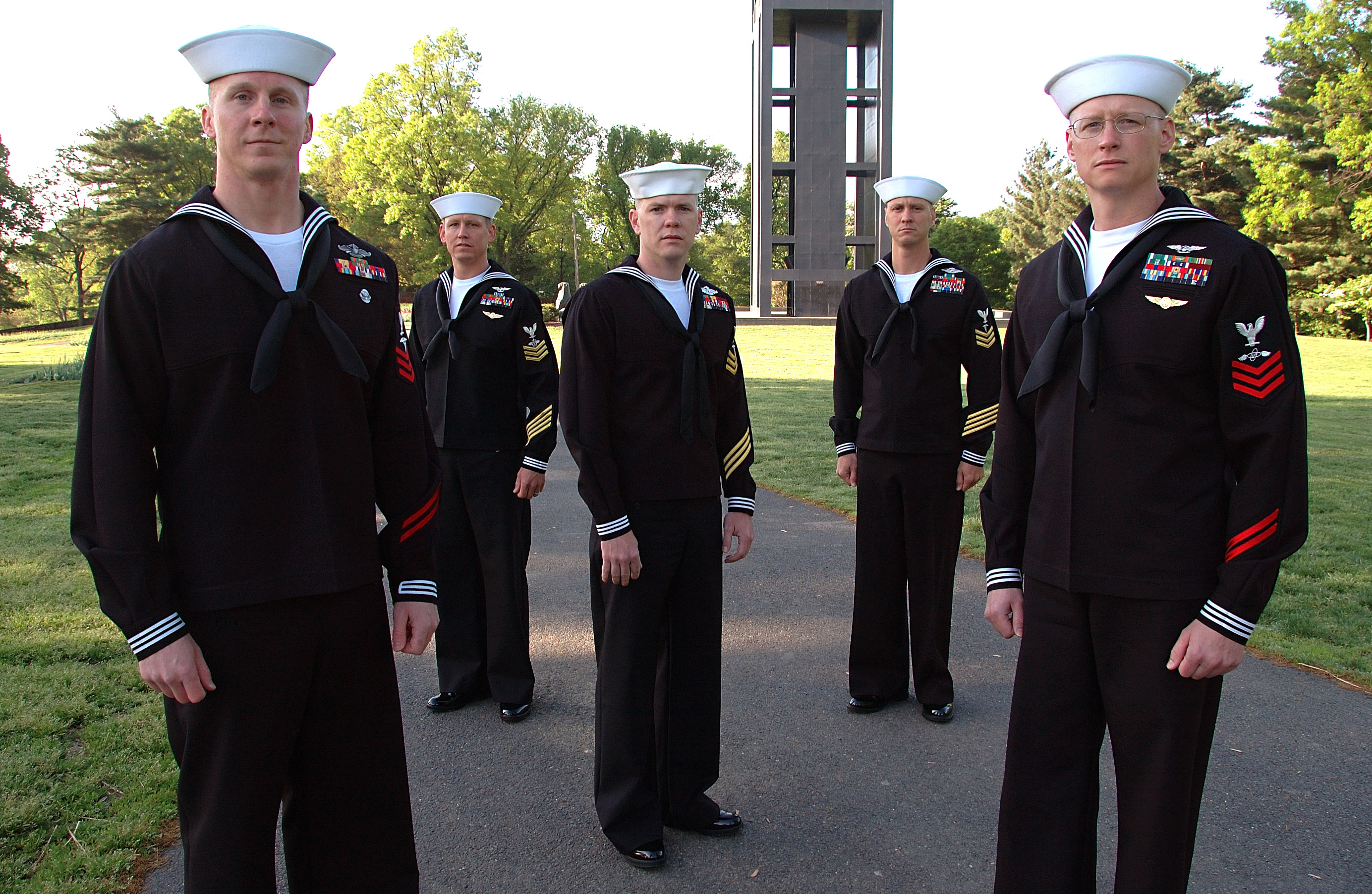
Five United States Navy Reserve petty officers in Service Dress Uniform. From left to right: HM1, AT1, HM1, HM1, AT1.

The title of petty officer in the United States Navy and United States Coast Guard has three separate "classes" (in order from junior to senior: 3rd class, 2nd class, 1st class) and three senior grades (chief petty officer, senior chief petty officer, master chief petty officer). Petty officer, first class is equivalent in paygrade to staff sergeant in the United States Army and Marine Corps, and technical sergeant in the United States Air Force and United States Space Force. Petty officer, second class is equivalent in paygrade to sergeant in the United States Army, Marine Corps, and Space Force, and staff sergeant in the United States Air Force. Petty officer, third class is equivalent in paygrade to corporal in the United States Army, corporal in the United States Marine Corps, senior airman in the United States Air Force, and specialist 4 in the United States Space Force.

In the Navy, Petty Officer, Third Class is the juniormost of the Non-Commissioned Officer ranks, and thus a sailor must demonstrate satisfactory performance in the previous rank (E-3) in the form of a favorable performance review(s) by his/her superiors, and the passing of an exam, in order to be promoted to PO3.

Enlisted rank has two components: rate (pay grade) and rating (job specialty). Both components are reflected in the title. A sailor in the rate of petty officer first class with a rating of Aviation Machinist's Mate, would be an Aviation Machinist's Mate 1st Class (abbreviated "AD1"). In the Navy, it is acceptable to refer to a Petty Officer as such, while in the Coast Guard, rating is always used.

== Gallery ==
Petty officer
(Antigua and Barbuda Coast Guard)

Petty officer
(Royal Australian Navy)

Petty officer
(Royal Bahamas Defence Force)

পেটি অফিসার
Pēṭi aphisāra
(Bangladesh Navy)

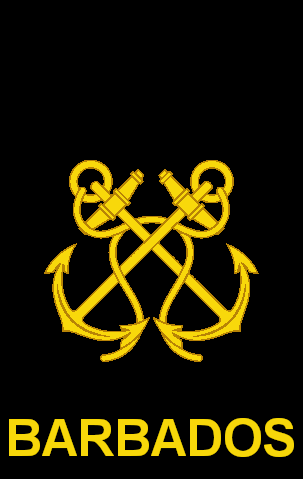
Petty officer
(Barbados Coast Guard)

Petty officer
(Republic of Fiji Navy)

Petty officer
(Guyana Coast Guard)

Petty officer
(Indian Navy)

Petty officer
(Irish: Mion-oifigeach)
(Irish Naval Service)

Petty officer
(Jamaican Coast Guard)

Petty officer
(Namibian Navy)

Petty officer
(Royal New Zealand Navy)

Petty officer
(Nigerian Navy)

Petty officer
(Papua New Guinea Maritime Element)

Petty officer
(South African Navy)

Petty officer
(Sri Lanka Navy)

Petty officer
(Trinidad and Tobago Coast Guard)

Petty officer
(Royal Navy)

== See also ==
- Boatswain's mate (disambiguation)
- List of United States Navy ratings
- Royal Navy ratings rank insignia
- United States Navy enlisted rates
