= Waszp Games =

International Sailing Competition

- Most recent edition or competition: 2025
- First held: 2017
- Class: Waszp
- Champion: Federico Bergamasco
- Most titles: (New Zealand) Sam Street - 2

The Waszp Games are an annual, international sailing regatta, taking place in the Waszp class of dinghy. The Waszp Games act as the world championships for the Waszp class.

== Events ==
Editions			Host		Ref
No.	Date	Year	Location	Nat.	Ref
1		2017	Lake Garda	Italy	
2		2019	Perth	Australia	
3	11 - 16 July	2022	Lake Garda	Italy	
4	10 - 15 December	2023	Sorrento	Australia	
5	5 - 10 August	2024	Sandefjord	Norway	
6	19 - 25 July	2025	Portland	United Kingdom	
7	22 - 28 March	2026	Pensacola	United States	

== Medalists ==
=== 8.2 Medalists ===
==== Men's ====
Year	Gold	Silver	Bronze
2017 Lake Garda	Great Britain; Harry Mighell	United States; Reed Baldridge	Japan; Kohei Kajmoto
2019 Perth	Great Britain; Rory Hunter	Australia; Tom Trotman	Norway; Alexander Hogheim
2022 Lake Garda	New Zealand; Sam Street	Great Britain; Sam Whaley	Italy; Enzio Savolini
2023 Sorrento	New Zealand; Sam Street	Denmark; Magnus Overbeck	France; Hippolyte Gruet
2024 Sandefjord	Denmark; Magnus Overbeck	Norway; Markus Berthet	Italy; Federico Bergamasco
2025 Portland	Italy; Federico Bergamasco	Spain; Pablo Astiazaran Pérez-Cela	Spain; Antonio Gasperini

==== Women's ====
Year	Gold	Silver	Bronze
2022 Lake Garda	New Zealand; Elise Beavis	Norway; Nora Doksrød	Norway; Mathilde Bregner Robertstad
2023 Sorrento	Great Britain; Hattie Rogers	New Zealand; Helena Sanderson	Australia; Tess Lloyd
2024 Sandefjord	Norway; Hedvig Doksrød	Norway; Marie Butler Wang	Norway; Nora Doksrød
2025 Portland	United States; Pearl Lattanzi	Australia; Mina Ferguson	Bermuda; Rachael Betschart

=== 7.5 Medalists ===
Year	Gold	Silver	Bronze
2025 Portland	Great Britain; Alex Jones	Norway; Martinius Melleby Hopstock	Norway; Pia Henriette Brun Tveita

=== 6.9 Medalists ===
Year	Gold	Silver	Bronze
2022 Lake Garda	Australia; Aidan Simmons	France; Maxime Donazzon	Italy; Piero Delneri
2023 Sorrento	Australia; Callum Simmons	Australia; Brenn Armstrong	Australia; Henri Levenspiel
2024 Sandefjord	Denmark; Madita Grigat		
2025 Portland	Italy; Olivia Castaldi	Italy; Pablo Astiazaran Pérez-Cela	Italy; Pietro Moncada
