= Minisail (dinghy) =

Single-handed sailing dinghy from 1959

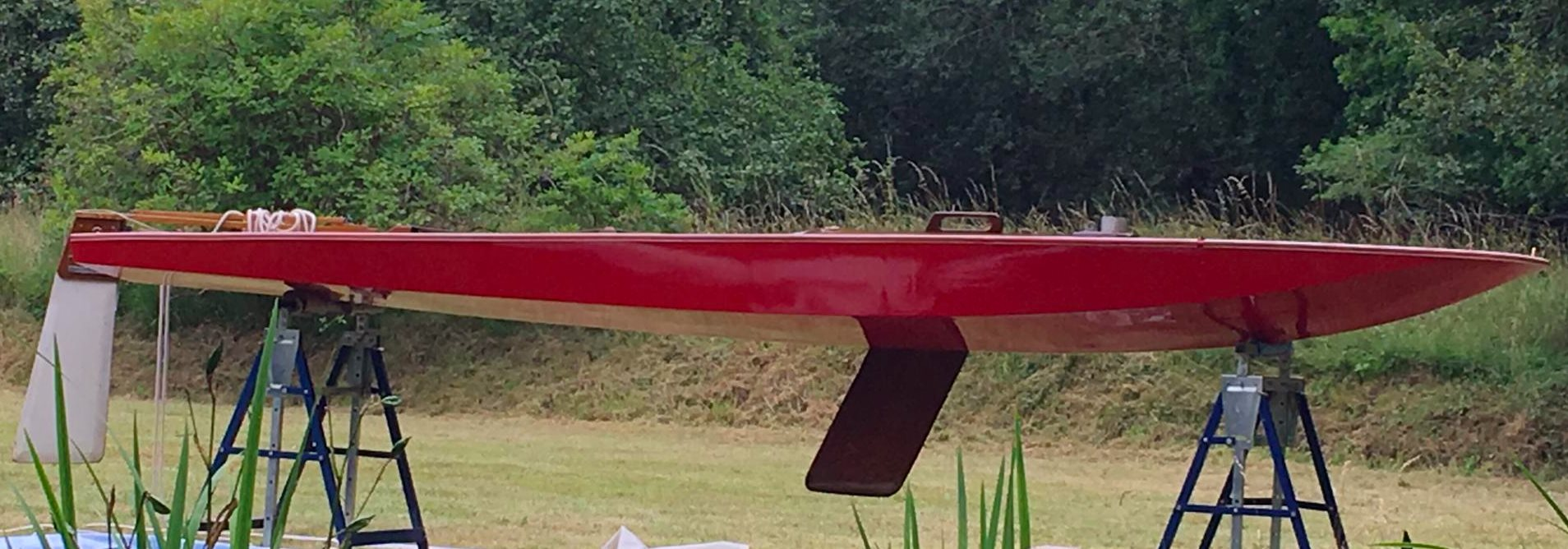
- Minisail Monaco Mk 1 MS10 hull profile

Development
- Designer: Ian Proctor
- Year: 1959
- Name: Minisail

Boat
- Crew: 1 + 1

Hull
- Type: Scow
- Construction: Variants: GRP, plywood, mixed
- LOA: 3.96 m (13.0 ft)
- Beam: 1.11 m (3 ft 8 in)

Rig
- Rig type: Unstayed Bermuda

Sails
- Total sail area: 7.4 sq m

Racing
- RYA PN: 1225

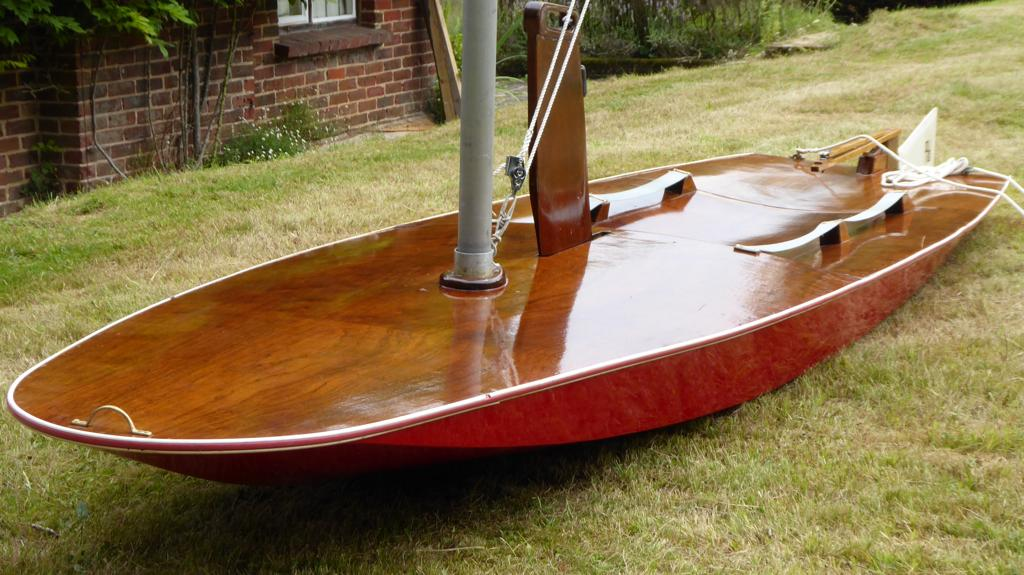
Minisail Monaco Mk 1 from 1959/60 after light restoration.

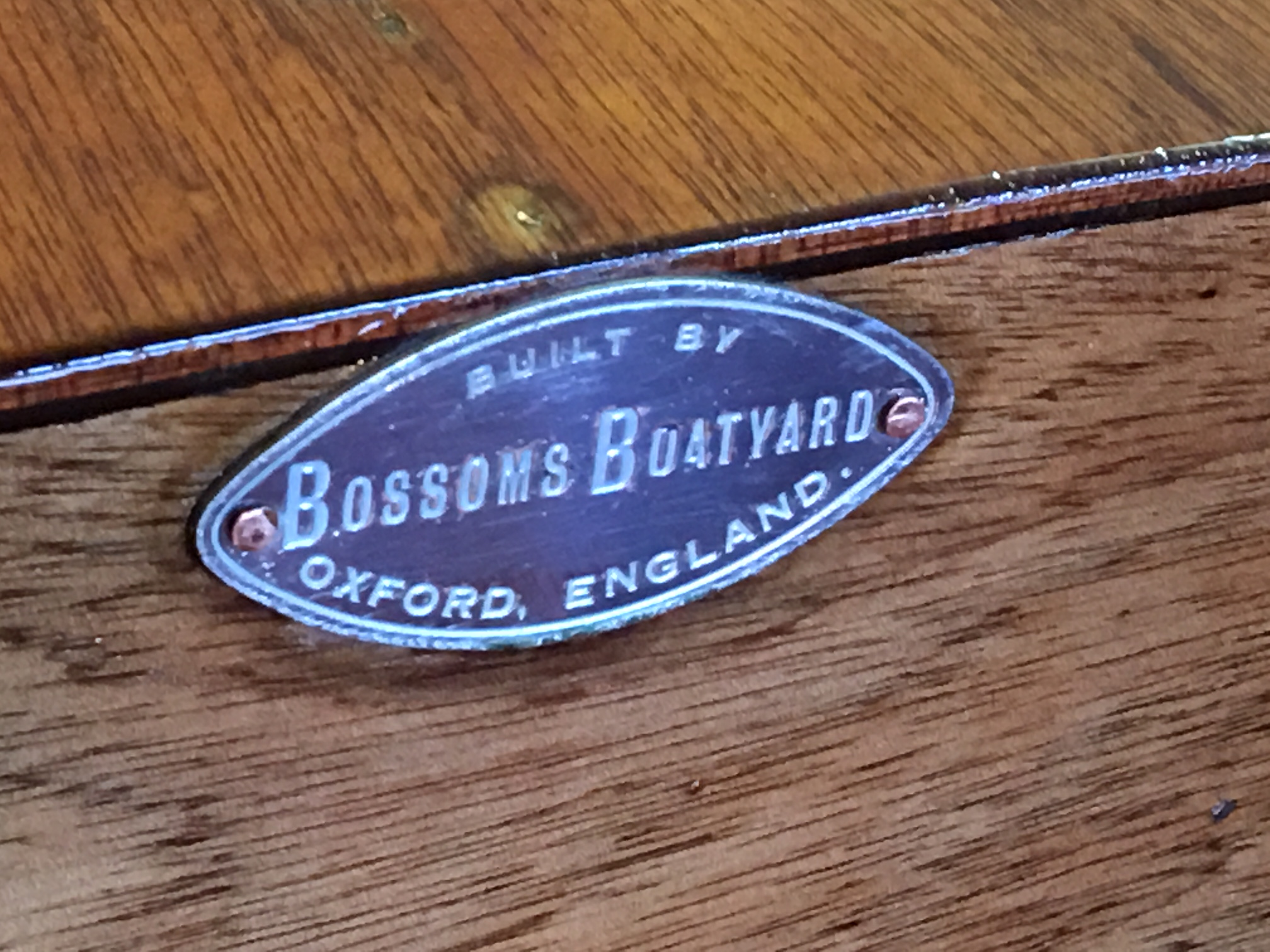
Wooden Minisail Mk.1 Monaco from 1959/60, built by Bossoms Boatyard in Oxford, England.

The Minisail is a 13-foot single-handed dinghy which was designed by Ian Proctor in 1959 and became popular in the 1960s. It was the predecessor to the Topper and was the first British production boat to popularise the idea of the "sailing surfboard". As the Topper gained popularity in the 1980s, the Minisail disappeared from the scene. However, on 28 August 2011, a group of enthusiasts restarted the Minisail Class Association, which now has a small but committed following mainly in north-west Europe. The class association website is Minisail.org

== Design history ==
The Minisail was inspired by the American Sailfish dinghy which David Thorpe and Ian Proctor had viewed whilst in the US, and was the first British attempt to create, in effect, a sailing surfboard. The initial prototype was built by Chippendales Boatyard in Emsworth, near the home of the designer Ian Proctor, and subsequently also licensed for initial production to Bossoms Boatyard and PlyCraft.

It was noted for its rapid acceleration. Even by modern standards, the Minisail is quick onto the plane in marginal conditions. Thorpe noted after sailing the prototype for the first time that ' I remember the sensation of sailing the prototype with its rapid acceleration was very different to sailing any other dinghy.'

By 1962, Chippendale, Bossoms and Plycraft dropped out of the picture and by 1963 the first fibreglass boats were produced. Eight were presented to HMS Devonshire, a guided missile cruiser, and described as the "finest piece of sports equipment the ship had ever had".

The boat found success when the Richmond Marine Company, who were manufacturing the boats at the time, convinced the Brighton Sailing Club to introduce it as a racing class, leading to increased coverage and its adoption as a racing dinghy in other sailing clubs.

The MiniSail was designed for two people to sail, as can be seen in the early advertising, although two large adults would find it a challenge. It is better considered as a "1 plus 1" - suitable for an adult and child. It has always been raced as a single-hander.

== Variants ==
The Minisail has always been a semi-development class, and a number of variants appeared quite quickly in the early years. There are two basic hull shapes; one has a shallow V-shape at the bows, whilst the other is slightly shorter and is flat-bottomed, making it easier to construct at home in plywood. Many hulls were manufactured in GRP. The original Monaco Mk.1 Minisails had no cockpit, just a shallow depression. Later, the Monaco Mk.2 appeared which had a centre cockpit; later still, the MiniSprint appeared which had a self-draining cockpit extending to the stern and a pivoting centreplate in place of the earlier dagger board.

In spite of all the variants, there was competitive racing between the various designs; no one design dominated in the National Championships.

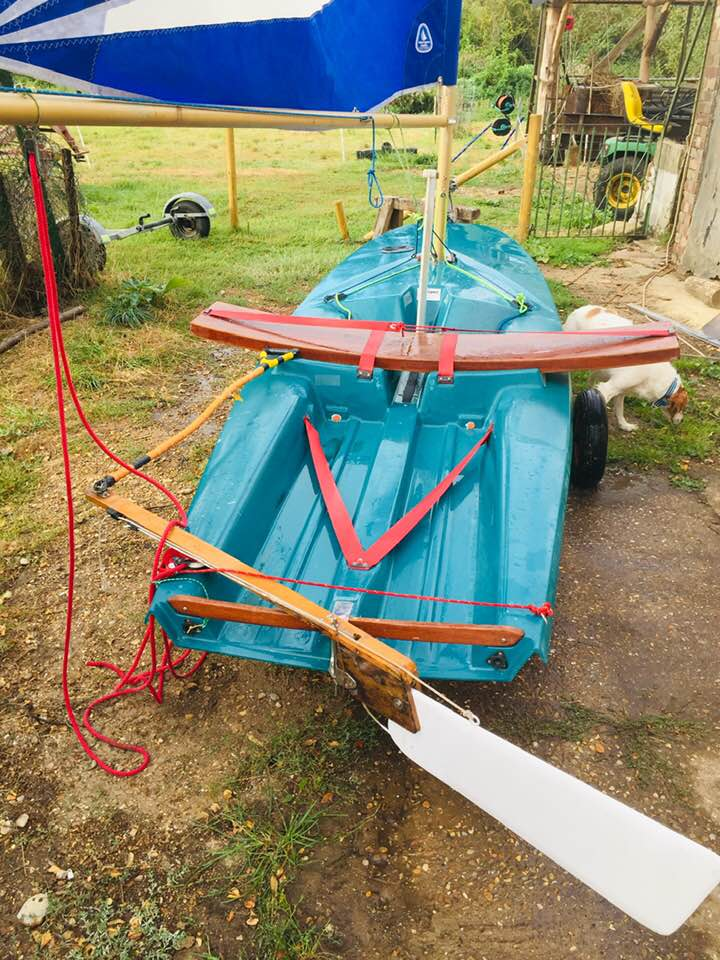
MiniSprint Mk 2 from the 1970s illustrating the design evolution of Ian Proctor's Minisail referred to by David Thorpe.

David Thorpe wrote '' It would be interesting to place a MiniSprint Mk2 alongside the original MiniSail MK 1 and to see the extent to which Ian Proctor’s various MiniSail designs have almost gone round in a circle. Each one of them has filled a need at a particular time and, in this writer’s view, each one is a design classic – perfect both visually and in function.''

Types of MiniSails in existence in order of historical appearance:

Monaco I (w) (1959)	Wood flush deck – only a few now in existence – not available new.
Monaco I (1963)	Glass flush deck – a number still around in the second-hand market sail numbers- if in good condition a potential fast boat good in the sea – not available new.
Sprite I (Middle Sixties)	Wood flush deck – platen bottom – the ‘original flying punt’ – available second hand plans available from Richmond Marine for home construction.
Monaco II (Middle-late Sixties)	As Monaco I in hull shape but with cockpit – available now as basic MiniSail from Richmond Marine – extensive second hand market (but consult committee)
Sprite II (Middle-late Sixties)	As Sprite I but with cockpit – plans available from Richmond Marine plus also kits – moderate second hand market
Sprint I (1973)	As Monaco II of lighter construction with tracked boom and footed sail – Mustard colour – good second hand market – one or two available from Richmond Marine
Sprint II (1975)	As Sprint I in hull design with a slightly deeper trunked section, self-draining cockpit, built-on sliding seat, optional centre sheeting and drop centre board – available new from Richmond Marine
(Meeson) (1975)	as Sprint II in grp hull design and drop centre board slot but with flush deck, optional sail plan. The deck is of wood.

Source: Minisail Yearbook 1975
