= 2017 Youth Sailing World Championships – Girl's Laser Radial =

Girl's Laser Radial at the 2017 Youth Sailing World Championships
- Venue: Sanya, China
- Dates: 9–16 December
- Competitors: 40 from 40 nations

Medalists
gold medal	Charlotte Rose	United States
silver medal	Dolores Moreira Fraschini	Uruguay
bronze medal	Daisy Collingridge	Great Britain

The girl's Laser Radial competition at the 2017 Youth Sailing World Championships took place between 9 and 16 December. 40 sailors from 40 nations were due to compete. Charlotte Rose of the United States won the event.

== Results ==
Pos	Helm	Country	R1	R2	R3	R4	R5	R6	R7	R8	R9	Total	Nett
1	Charlotte Rose	United States	1.0	1.0	17.0	1.0	4.0	1.0	(25.0)	1.0	17.0	68.0	43.0
2	Dolores Moreira Fraschini	Uruguay	3.0	2.0	9.0	2.0	1.0	4.0	7.0	15.0	(23.0)	66.0	43.0
3	Daisy Collingridge	United Kingdom	7.0	18.0	(27.0)	12.0	7.0	8.0	4.0	2.0	11.0	96.0	69.0
4	Luciana Cardozo	Argentina	8.0	7.0	6.0	4.0	17.0	7.0	(22.0)	7.0	15.0	93.0	71.0
5	Annabelle Rennie-Younger	New Zealand	11.0	4.0	(41.0 DSQ)	5.0	14.0	19.0	3.0	4.0	12.0	113.0	72.0
6	Valeriya Lomatchenko	Russia	(41.0 UFD)	6.0	1.0	28.0	6.0	5.0	21.0	6.0	2.0	116.0	75.0
7	Elyse Ainsworth	Australia	4.0	(25.0)	19.0	16.0	10.0	3.0	11.0	11.0	7.0	106.0	81.0
8	Federica Cattarozzi	Italy	5.0	20.0	13.0	7.0	(32.0)	12.0	15.0	5.0	4.0	113.0	81.0
9	Annabelle Westerhof	Netherlands	17.0	5.0	14.0	10.0	8.0	(20.0)	8.0	9.0	10.0	101.0	81.0
10	Wiktoria Golebiowska	Poland	2.0	21.0	12.0	3.0	(22.0)	13.0	16.0	3.0	13.0	105.0	83.0
11	Shai Kakon	Israel	10.0	10.0	2.0	18.0	21.0	14.0	13.0	(23.0)	5.0	116.0	93.0
12	Agija Е̄lerte	Latvia	9.0	13.0	11.0	17.0	(31.0)	6.0	23.0	8.0	8.0	126.0	95.0
13	Carlota Sanchez Merino	Spain	6.0	11.0	7.0	(25.0)	3.0	17.0	18.0	20.0	16.0	123.0	98.0
14	Clara Gravely	Canada	12.0	23.0	(31.0)	14.0	19.0	16.0	2.0	14.0	3.0	134.0	103.0
15	Karla Savar	Croatia	15.0	16.0	18.0	15.0	9.0	(32.0)	1.0	18.0	25.0	149.0	117.0
16	Klara Utterstrom	Sweden	19.0	8.0	(33.0)	13.0	2.0	29.0	9.0	13.0	26.0	152.0	119.0
17	Ilayda Veziroglu	Turkey	20.0	9.0	21.0	8.0	27.0	11.0	(41.0 DNF)	19.0	21.0	177.0	136.0
18	Hannah Anderssohn	Germany	(41.0 UFD)	12.0	20.0	6.0	16.0	21.0	28.0	33.0	1.0	178.0	137.0
19	Allena Rankine	Cayman Islands	28.0	3.0	10.0	(31.0)	23.0	18.0	10.0	25.0	20.0	168.0	137.0
20	Nancy Highfield	Hong Kong	18.0	27.0	23.0	21.0	15.0	(28.0)	6.0	12.0	19.0	169.0	141.0
21	Michala Norsell	Denmark	21.0	24.0	25.0	20.0	11.0	15.0	(30.0)	17.0	9.0	172.0	142.0
22	Alejandra Margarita Montemayor	Mexico	16.0	22.0	8.0	(27.0)	5.0	23.0	24.0	27.0	18.0	170.0	143.0
23	Sally Bell	Ireland	13.0	35.0	30.0	11.0	25.0	2.0	(36.0)	24.0	6.0	182.0	146.0
24	Jiaming Chen	China	14.0	34.0	15.0	9.0	12.0	(41.0 DSQ)	12.0	22.0	28.0	187.0	146.0
25	Emiry Koya	Japan	22.0	30.0	4.0	(33.0)	13.0	10.0	29.0	21.0	24.0	186.0	153.0
26	Sonja Stock	South Africa	25.0	14.0	5.0	(30.0)	29.0	25.0	5.0	26.0	27.0	186.0	156.0
27	Veera Kaakinen	Finland	23.0	17.0	32.0	26.0	26.0	9.0	(35.0)	32.0	14.0	214.0	179.0
28	Martine Thuen	Norway	30.0	15.0	26.0	24.0	18.0	(33.0)	19.0	16.0	33.0	214.0	181.0
29	Daeun Nam	South Korea	32.0	28.0	3.0	22.0	30.0	26.0	14.0	30.0	(37.0)	222.0	185.0
30	Deisy Nhaquile	Mozambique	27.0	19.0	16.0	(32.0)	20.0	22.0	27.0	31.0	32.0	226.0	194.0
31	Christine Reimer	Brazil	29.0	(31.0)	28.0	29.0	28.0	31.0	20.0	10.0	22.0	228.0	197.0
32	Cheng-Ling Feng	Chinese Taipei	26.0	32.0	(35.0)	19.0	24.0	24.0	32.0	29.0	31.0	252.0	217.0
33	Lucie Keblová	Czech Republic	24.0	26.0	22.0	35.0	36.0	30.0	26.0	(37.0)	34.0	270.0	233.0
34	Janisara Romanyk	Thailand	34.0	36.0	29.0	(38.0)	35.0	35.0	17.0	34.0	30.0	288.0	250.0
35	Dominga Gumucio	Chile	35.0	29.0	24.0	23.0	33.0	37.0	34.0	35.0	(39.0)	289.0	250.0
36	Helene Johnson	Cook Islands	33.0	33.0	36.0	(37.0)	37.0	36.0	31.0	28.0	29.0	300.0	263.0
37	Jalese Gordon	Antigua and Barbuda	31.0	38.0	34.0	34.0	(40.0)	27.0	33.0	38.0	36.0	311.0	271.0
38	Sofía Rivera Sabat	Puerto Rico	36.0	(40.0)	38.0	40.0	34.0	34.0	37.0	36.0	35.0	330.0	290.0
39	Mary-Kathryn-Grace Mann	Turks and Caicos Islands	37.0	(39.0)	37.0	36.0	38.0	38.0	38.0	39.0	38.0	340.0	301.0
40	Maria Gay	Samoa	38.0	37.0	39.0	39.0	39.0	39.0	39.0	(40.0)	40.0	350.0	310.0
