= Sam Street =

Sam Street may refer to:

- Sam Street, co-founder of Postmates, an American food delivery service
- Sam Street (baseball)
- Sam Street (sailor)
