= 2017 Youth Sailing World Championships – Boy's 29er =

Boy's 29er at the 2017 Youth Sailing World Championships
- Venue: Sanya, China
- Dates: 9–16 December
- Competitors: 60 from 30 nations

Medalists
gold medal	Théo Revil; Gautier Guevel	France
silver medal	Mathias Berthet; Alexander Franks-Penty	Norway
bronze medal	Santiago Duncan; Elias Dalli	Argentina

The boy's 29er competition at the 2017 Youth Sailing World Championships took place between 9 and 16 December. 60 sailors from 30 nations were due to compete. Théo Revil and Gautier Guevel of France won the event.

== Results ==
Pos	Helm	Crew	Country															
1	Théo Revil	Gautier Guevel	France	4.0	2.0	8.0	7.0	1.0	9.0	(15.0)	14.0	3.0	2.0	2.0	10.0	7.0	84.0	69.0
2	Mathias Berthet	Alexander Franks-Penty	Norway	1.0	1.0	3.0	8.0	(31.0 DSQ)	20.0	10.0	6.0	4.0	4.0	5.0	1.0	14.0	108.0	77.0
3	Santiago Duncan	Elias Dalli	Argentina	5.0	8.0	4.0	17.0	4.0	7.0	4.0	11.0	(21.0)	3.0	8.0	8.0	1.0	101.0	80.0
4	Rok Verderber	Klemen Semelbauer	Slovenia	15.0	4.0	17.0	1.0	5.0	1.0	7.0	1.0	7.0	5.0	6.0	(24.0)	16.0	109.0	85.0
5	Ville Korhonen	Robin Berner	Finland	2.0	12.0	11.0	3.0	2.0	6.0	13.0	4.0	2.0	(18.0)	16.0	16.0	11.0	116.0	98.0
6	Federico Zampiccoli	Leonardo Chiste	Italy	7.0	20.0	5.0	13.0	(21.0)	2.0	8.0	7.0	12.0	15.0	3.0	7.0	2.0	122.0	101.0
7	Neil Marcellini	Ian Brill	United States	9.0	3.0	20.0	6.0	15.0	15.0	(21.0)	8.0	5.0	8.0	1.0	4.0	12.0	127.0	106.0
8	Seb Lardies	Scott McKenzie	New Zealand	12.0	21.0	13.0	2.0	3.0	17.0	1.0	(31.0 DSQ)	1.0	10.0	14.0	18.0	20.0	163.0	132.0
9	Henry Larkings	Miles Davey	Australia	11.0	5.0	9.0	4.0	8.0	23.0	6.0	22.0	20.0	6.0	18.0	(31.0 UFD)	8.0	171.0	140.0
10	Kasper Nordenram	Linus Berglund	Sweden	3.0	16.0	1.0	20.0	11.0	(21.0)	19.0	9.0	14.0	9.0	19.0	14.0	10.0	166.0	145.0
11	Malo Kennish	Anatole Martin	Hong Kong	8.0	14.0	12.0	23.0	10.0	16.0	12.0	15.0	6.0	(31.0 UFD)	9.0	11.0	18.0	185.0	154.0
12	Frederik Bruun	Mads Fuglbjerg	Denmark	18.0	9.0	2.0	10.0	27.0	10.0	14.0	20.0	(31.0 UFD)	16.0	23.0	3.0	4.0	187.0	156.0
13	Muhamad Dhiauddin Rozaini	Abdul Latif Mansor	Malaysia	13.0	15.0	(26.0)	5.0	18.0	13.0	17.0	13.0	11.0	24.0	13.0	5.0	15.0	188.0	162.0
14	Hernán Umpierre	Fernando Diz	Uruguay	(28.0)	7.0	21.0	19.0	6.0	14.0	16.0	3.0	16.0	1.0	28.0	23.0	9.0	191.0	163.0
15	William Bonin	Samuel Bonin	Canada	19.0	13.0	6.0	18.0	13.0	24.0	20.0	26.0	10.0	11.0	4.0	(28.0)	13.0	205.0	177.0
16	Breno Kneipp	Ian Paim	Brazil	(26.0)	10.0	23.0	22.0	26.0	3.0	5.0	2.0	8.0	21.0	24.0	17.0	25.0	212.0	186.0
17	Andrés Barrio García	Nestor Vega Betancor	Spain	24.0	6.0	18.0	21.0	9.0	25.0	(30.0)	16.0	24.0	26.0	7.0	9.0	3.0	218.0	188.0
18	Dmitry Lazdin	Dmitrii Araslanov	Russia	16.0	23.0	19.0	16.0	19.0	5.0	18.0	21.0	(26.0)	14.0	15.0	21.0	5.0	218.0	192.0
19	Gaio Koizumi	Ryo Kawamura	Japan	14.0	24.0	16.0	12.0	7.0	18.0	3.0	(29.0)	23.0	13.0	29.0	12.0	29.0	229.0	200.0
20	Nick Robins	Billy Vennis-Ozanne	United Kingdom	17.0	(26.0)	7.0	26.0	14.0	19.0	26.0	17.0	9.0	17.0	20.0	25.0	6.0	229.0	203.0
21	Mikolaj Staniul	Kajetan Jabłoński	Poland	6.0	25.0	24.0	15.0	16.0	4.0	23.0	10.0	17.0	25.0	22.0	(27.0)	17.0	231.0	204.0
22	Saurabh Pal	Winston Yeo	Singapore	23.0	18.0	22.0	(27.0)	22.0	12.0	2.0	12.0	25.0	23.0	11.0	15.0	23.0	235.0	208.0
23	Lars Postma	Pim Schep	Netherlands	20.0	19.0	25.0	14.0	(29.0)	27.0	22.0	18.0	18.0	12.0	25.0	2.0	19.0	250.0	221.0
24	Bálint Kocsis	András Pavlik	Hungary	27.0	11.0	14.0	(31.0 UFD)	24.0	30.0	29.0	27.0	15.0	7.0	17.0	6.0	24.0	262.0	231.0
25	Simon Marecek	Jan Svoboda	Czech Republic	25.0	22.0	15.0	11.0	17.0	(26.0)	25.0	19.0	13.0	20.0	26.0	20.0	21.0	260.0	234.0
26	Bendix Hempel	Tobias Matern	Germany	22.0	(29.0)	27.0	25.0	28.0	22.0	9.0	24.0	19.0	22.0	10.0	22.0	22.0	281.0	252.0
27	Rocco Falcone	Louis Bavay	Netherlands Antilles	29.0	27.0	10.0	24.0	25.0	29.0	11.0	25.0	(31.0 UFD)	19.0	12.0	13.0	28.0	283.0	252.0
28	Taylor Hasson	Steven Hardee	United States Virgin Islands	10.0	28.0	28.0	9.0	12.0	8.0	28.0	23.0	28.0	(31.0 UFD)	21.0	31.0 UFD	27.0	284.0	253.0
29	Dongdong Xu	Hongxin Sun	China	21.0	17.0	(29.0)	28.0	20.0	11.0	27.0	5.0	22.0	27.0	27.0	26.0	26.0	286.0	257.0
30	Alfredo Urzua	Matias Poncell Maurin	Chile	30.0	30.0	30.0	29.0	23.0	28.0	24.0	28.0	27.0	28.0	30.0	19.0	(31.0 DNF)	357.0	326.0
