= Pool cleaner =

Pool cleaner may refer to:

- Automated pool cleaner
- Pool skimmer
- Swimming pool service technician, clean pools and service major pool equipment
