= Fly (dinghy) =

Type of sailing dinghy

Development
- Designer: Roger Fillery, Ken Ford
- Country: United Kingdom
- Role: Sail trainer
- Name: Fly

Boat
- Crew: 1
- Trapeze: No

Hull
- Hull weight: 39 kilograms (86 lb)
- LOH: 2.9 metres (9.5 ft)
- Beam: 1.15 metres (3.8 ft)

Hull appendages
- Keel: Daggerboard

Sails
- Spinnaker area: No
- Total sail area: 4.09 square metres (44.0 sq ft)

The Fly class is a singlehanded sailing dinghy designed by Roger Fillery and later modified by Kenneth Ford.

It was intended to be built at home, and appears to have been developed as a youth trainer for the British Moth. The early boats were built from canvas, although that changed and later boats employed a plywood bottom. The modifications to the original design made by Kenneth Ford were mainly a deeper free-board allowing a deeper cockpit with larger roll decks allowing larger children and adults to sail the class.

It was used as a trainer for the British Moth at the Lea Avon Sailing Club before the club folded in 1971. The original club was founded in Leyton and sailed on the River Lea. It later moved to Highams Park Lake. The club hosted an international event for the class, on the River Lea, during the 1960s.
