= Boatswain's mate =

A boatswain's mate is a petty officer assisting the boatswain aboard ship.

Specifically, boatswain's mate may refer to:

- Boatswain's mate (United States Navy), a job classification in the United States Navy
- Boatswain's mate (United States Coast Guard), a job classification in the United States Coast Guard
- Boatswain's mate (National Oceanic and Atmospheric Administration), a job classification in the United States National Oceanic and Atmospheric Administration
- Bootsmannsmaat, a historical naval rank in Austria, Germany, and Russia
- The Boatswain's Mate, a 1914 one-act opera by Ethel Smyth

== See also ==
- Boatswain (disambiguation)
