= Bossoms Boatyard =

Coordinates: 51.7640°N 1.2809°W

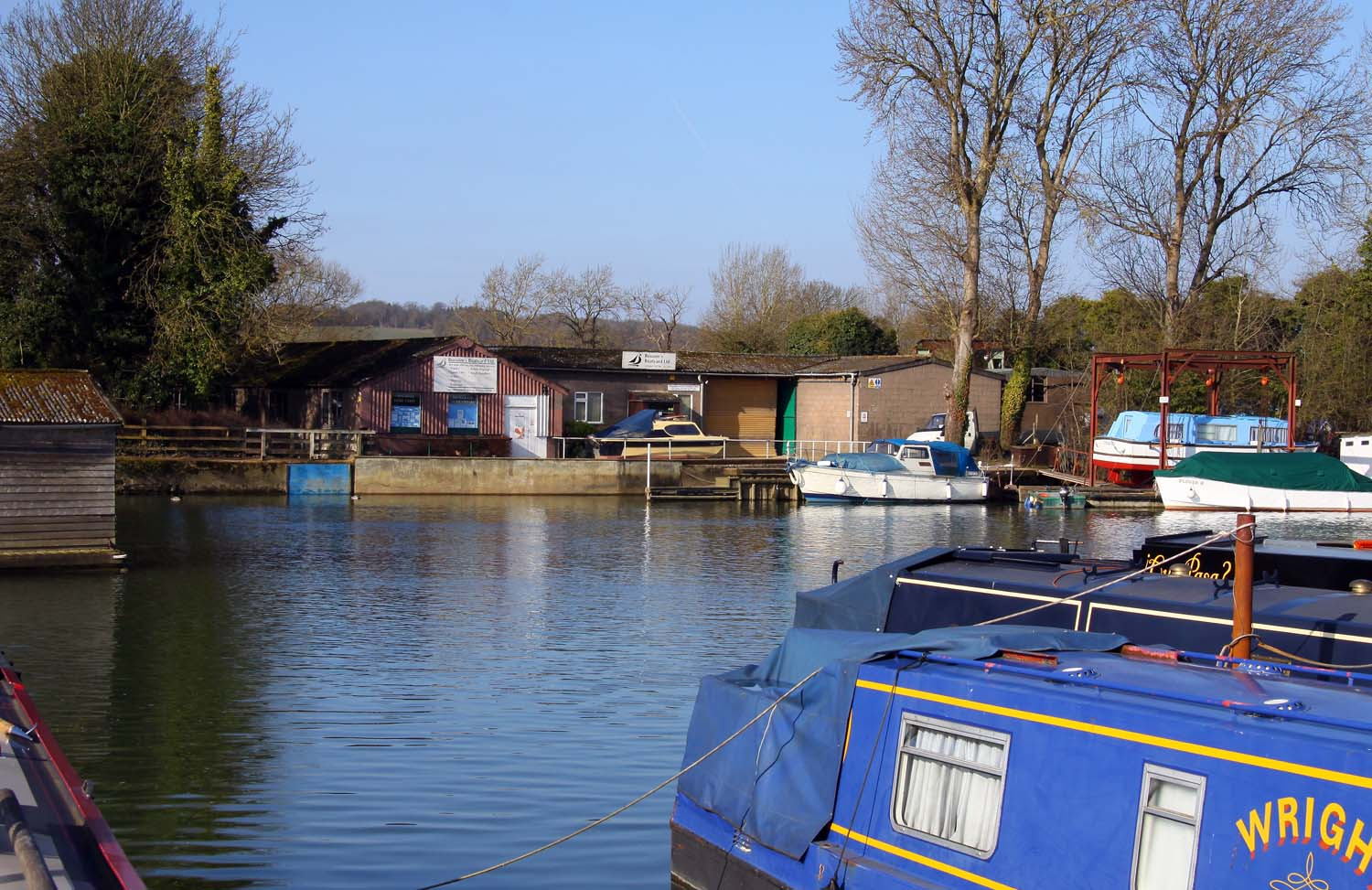
Bossoms Boatyard

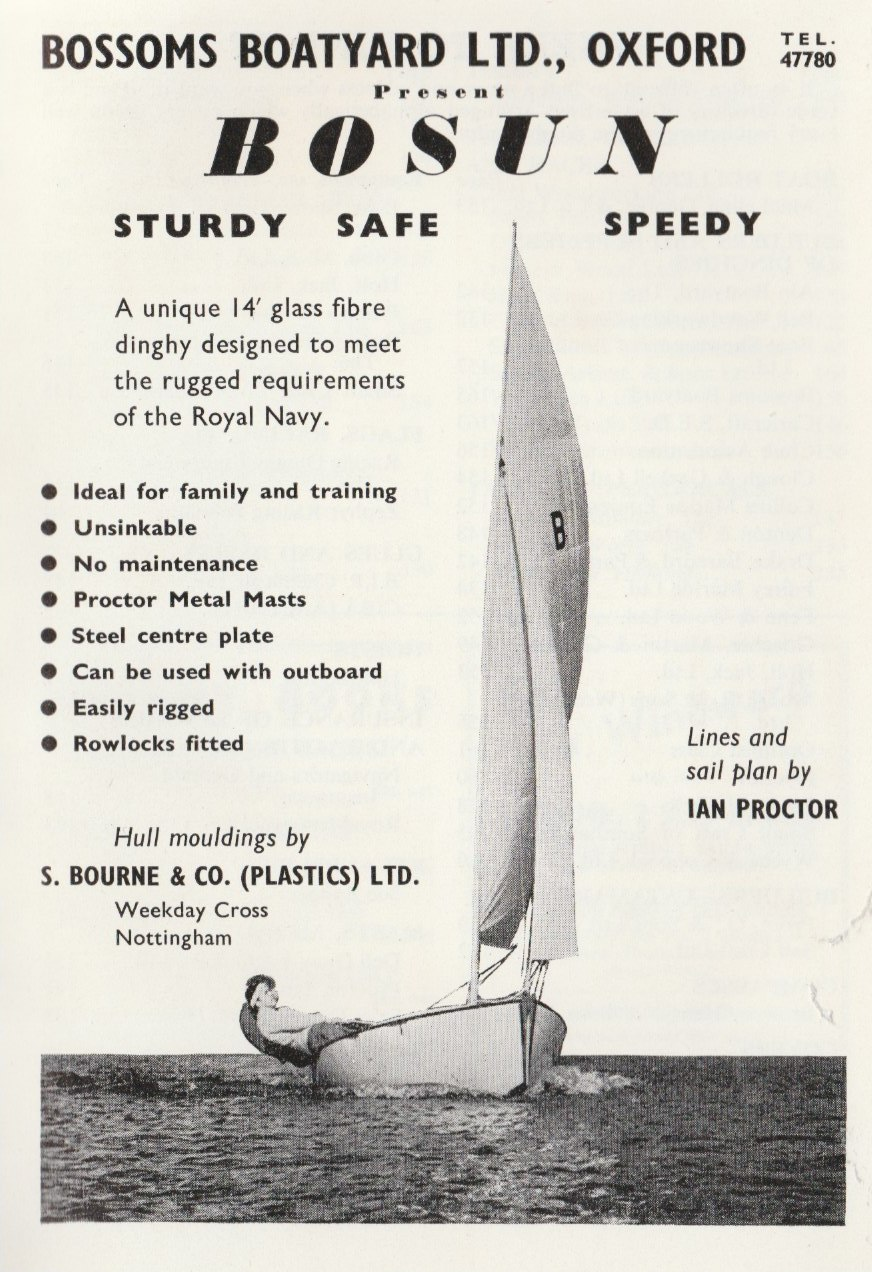
Bossoms Boatyard advertisement from 1962

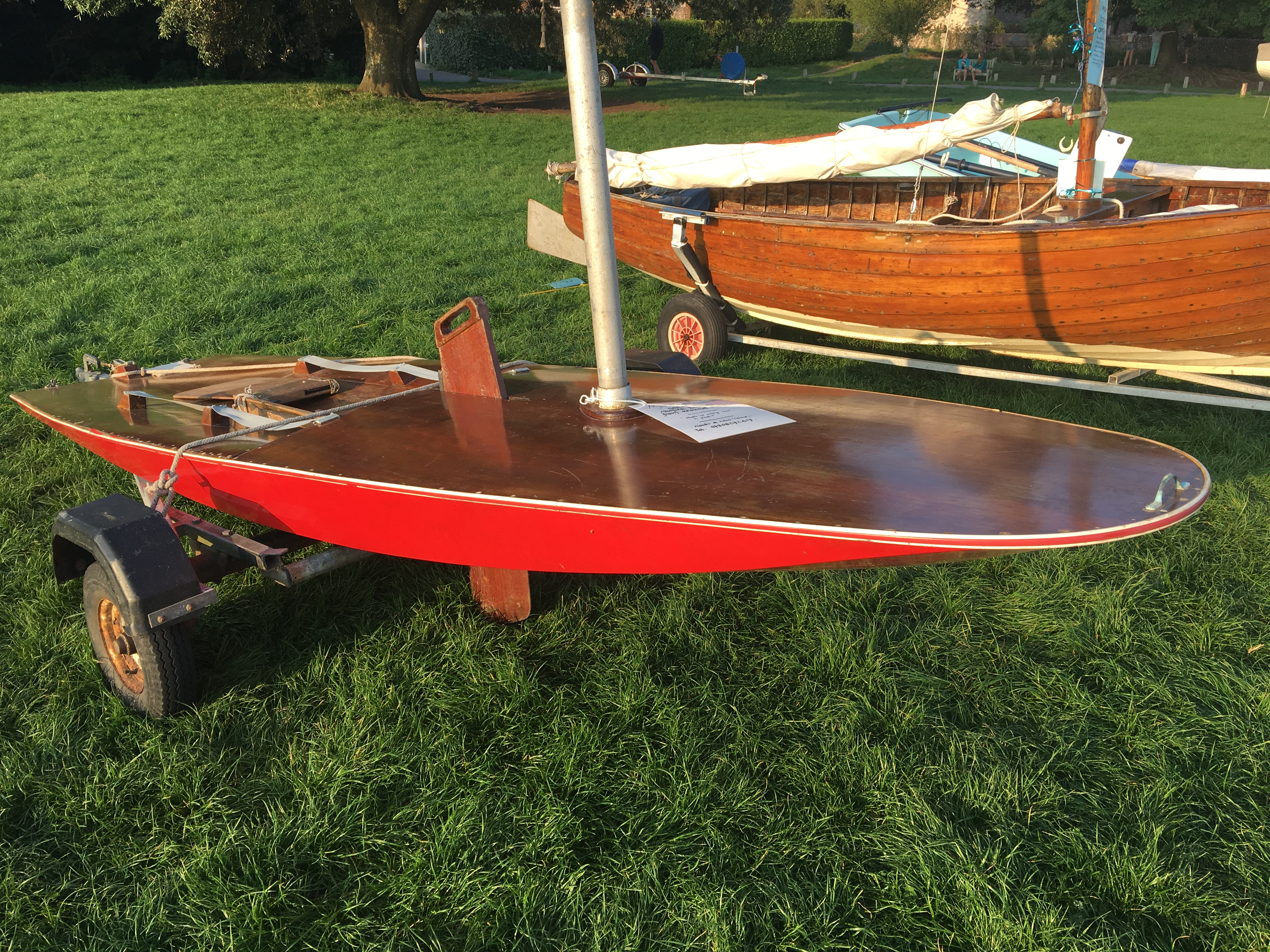
A 1959/60 Minisail Monaco Mk.1 boat built at Bossoms Boatyard

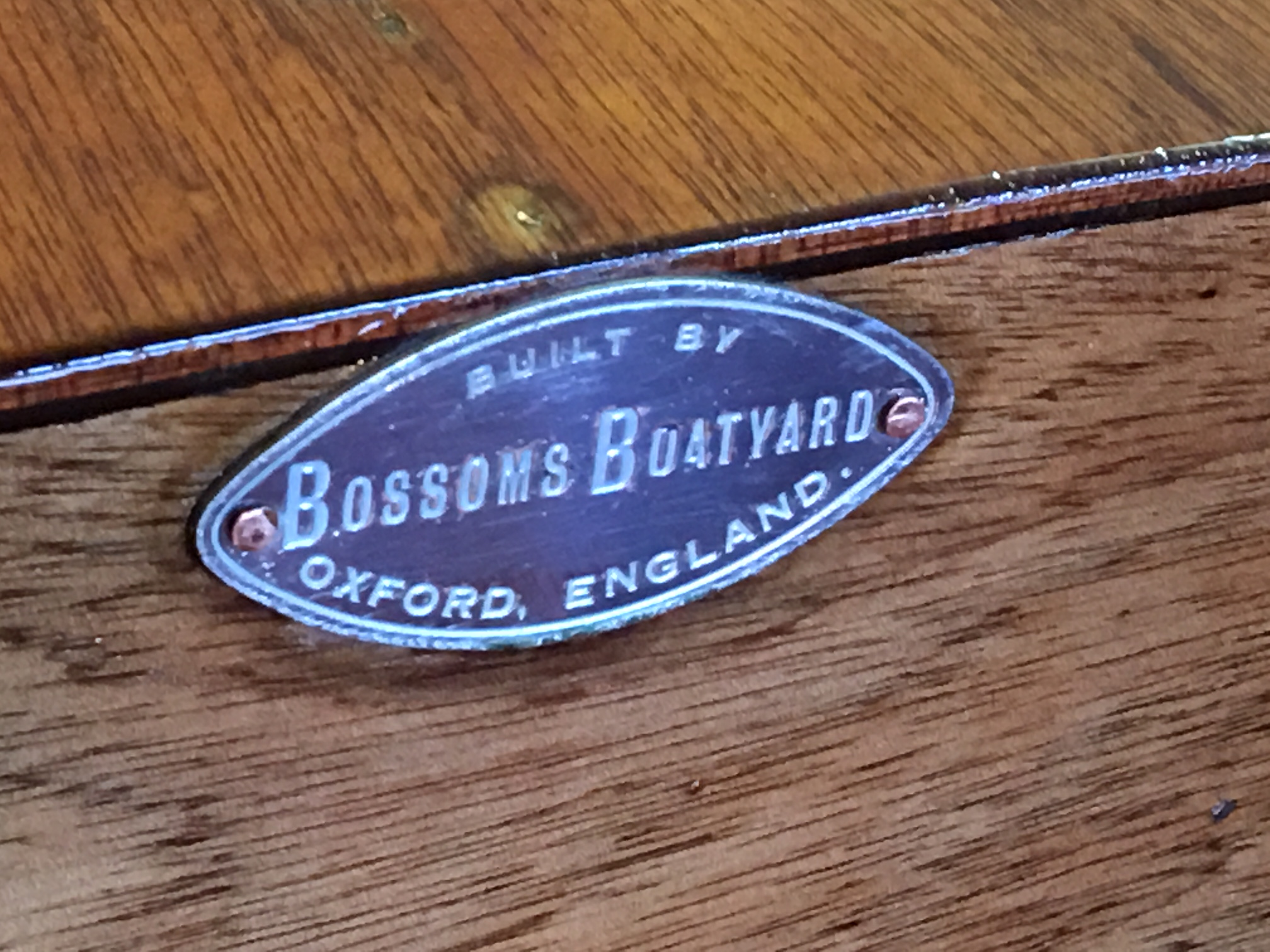
1959/60 Monaco Mk 1 Bossoms Boatyard, Oxford, England builders plate

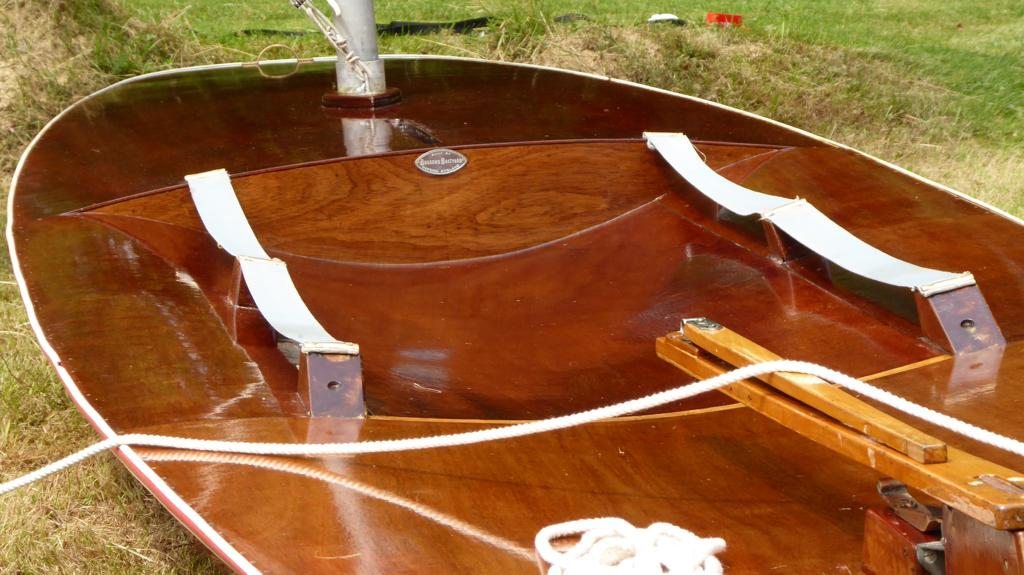
Bossoms 1959/60 Monaco Mk 1 deck

Bossoms Boatyard is located opposite Port Meadow, Oxford, England, on the bank of the River Thames.

== History ==
The yard was managed by the Bossom family from about 1830 until 1945, when the last in a line of several generations retired from the family business. Boats continue to be built by the company at this site to this day.

Bossoms was one of the first boat builders to develop the use of GRP for hulls. They specialise in building both sailcraft and craft with electric motors and are one of the few boat builders still in existence that exhibited at the first ever London Boat Show.

== Boats ==
Some of the craft built by Bossoms include:

- The Vertue (yacht)
- The Bosun (dinghy)
- The Minisail (dinghy)
- The Admiralty Sailing Craft (ASC) 16 foot dinghy
- Electric boats and various launches.

== See also ==
- Medley Sailing Club
