= Vertue (yacht) =

The Vertue Class of yacht is a 25'3" length design by Laurent Giles dating from 1936, when Andrillot was launched. The class was not named Vertue until 1946: it collected the name in the wake of the win by Epeneta - a boat built to the design - of the Little Ship Club's 'Vertue Cup'. In 1939, the Epeneta had completed a cruise from The Solent to Belle Île in Southern Brittany and back in only 19 days. The Vertue Cup, donated by Michael Vertue to the Little Ship Club in 1927, is given for the best log of a cruise longer than a week by a member of the club.

== Achievements ==
The design has an enviable reputation as a long-distance cruiser, with several remarkable cruises completed by boats of this class and close derivatives, in particular by Humphrey Barton, in Vertue XXXV and by Eric and Susan Hiscock. Barton was the original owner of Andrillot.

== Design evolution ==
There have been minor variants of the design - most obviously in the shape of the coach-roof: the hull form has, apart from the size increase, remained consistent throughout. Sail numbers ranging up to 230 are listed, suggesting that of the order of 200 have been built.

The early boats were gaff-rigged; more recent ones have been bermuda rigged, with many older boats converted to a Bermudan configuration.

== Vertue II ==
The Vertue II design is slightly larger at 25’ 8” overall with a 7’ 10” beam (6” wider) and approximately 30 have been produced in GRP since the 1970s by Westerly yachts and by Bossoms Boatyard in Oxford.
