= Skim =

Skim or skimming may refer to:

== Sports and games ==
- Skimboarding, also skimming, a sport which involves riding a board on wet sand or shallow water
- Snowmobile skipping, also known as skimming, operating a snowmobile on water
- Stone skimming, skipping or bouncing a stone on a water surface

== Money, crime, and business ==
- Price skimming, a marketing term
- Skimming (credit card fraud), a type of credit card fraud
- Skimming (fraud), a type of cash fraud

== Computers and cybercrime ==
- Skim (software), an open-source PDF reader
- Smart Common Input Method, also called 'SKIM' when optimized for the K Desktop Environment
- Web skimming, the stealing of payment information via malware injection

== Other ==
- Cream separation, the skimming of cream from milk
- Skimming (reading), a process or technique of speed reading
- Skim (graphic novel), a Canadian coming-of-age graphic novel

== See also ==
- Skim milk or skimmed milk, a variety of milk from which the fat has been removed
- Skimmer (disambiguation)
- Skin (disambiguation)
