= Tess Lloyd =

Australian sailor

Personal information
- Born: 19 June 1995 (age 31)

Sport
- Country: Australia
- Sport: Sailing
- Event: 49erFX Waszp
Medal record
Sailing
Representing Australia
Waszp Games
Gold medal – first place	2023 Sorrento	Women's

Tess Lloyd (born 19 June 1995) is an Australian competitive sailor.

With Caitlin Elks she finished 11th of 55 in the 2014 ISAF Sailing World Championships – 49er FX. At the 2017 49er FX World Championships she and Eliza Solly finished 23rd of 56.

Lloyd qualified to represent Australia at the 2020 Summer Olympics. She competed in the 49erFX event, with Jaime Ryan, finishing 13th in the field of 21.
