= Medley Sailing Club =

Dinghy sailing club on the River Thames

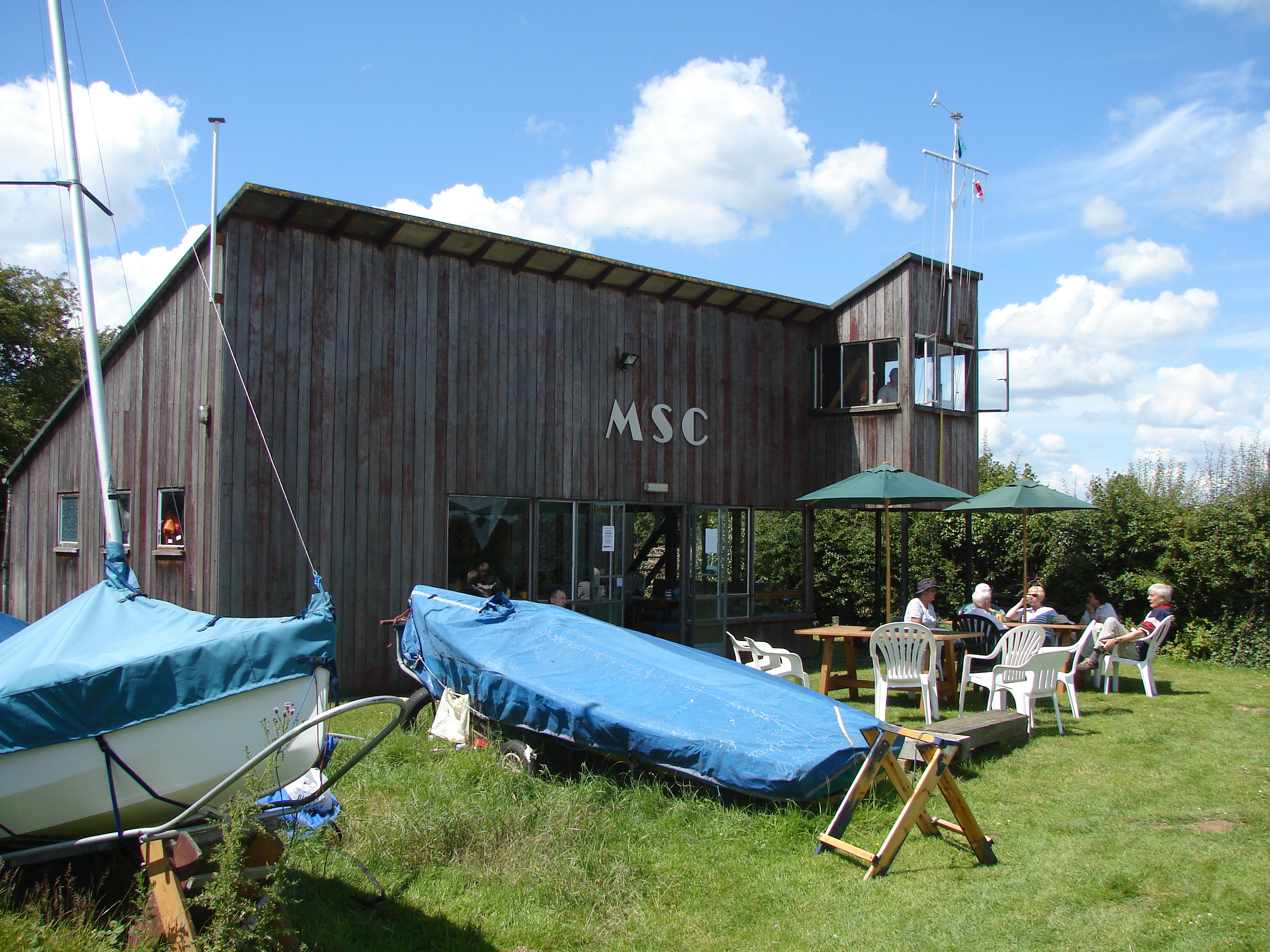
View of Medley Sailing Club.

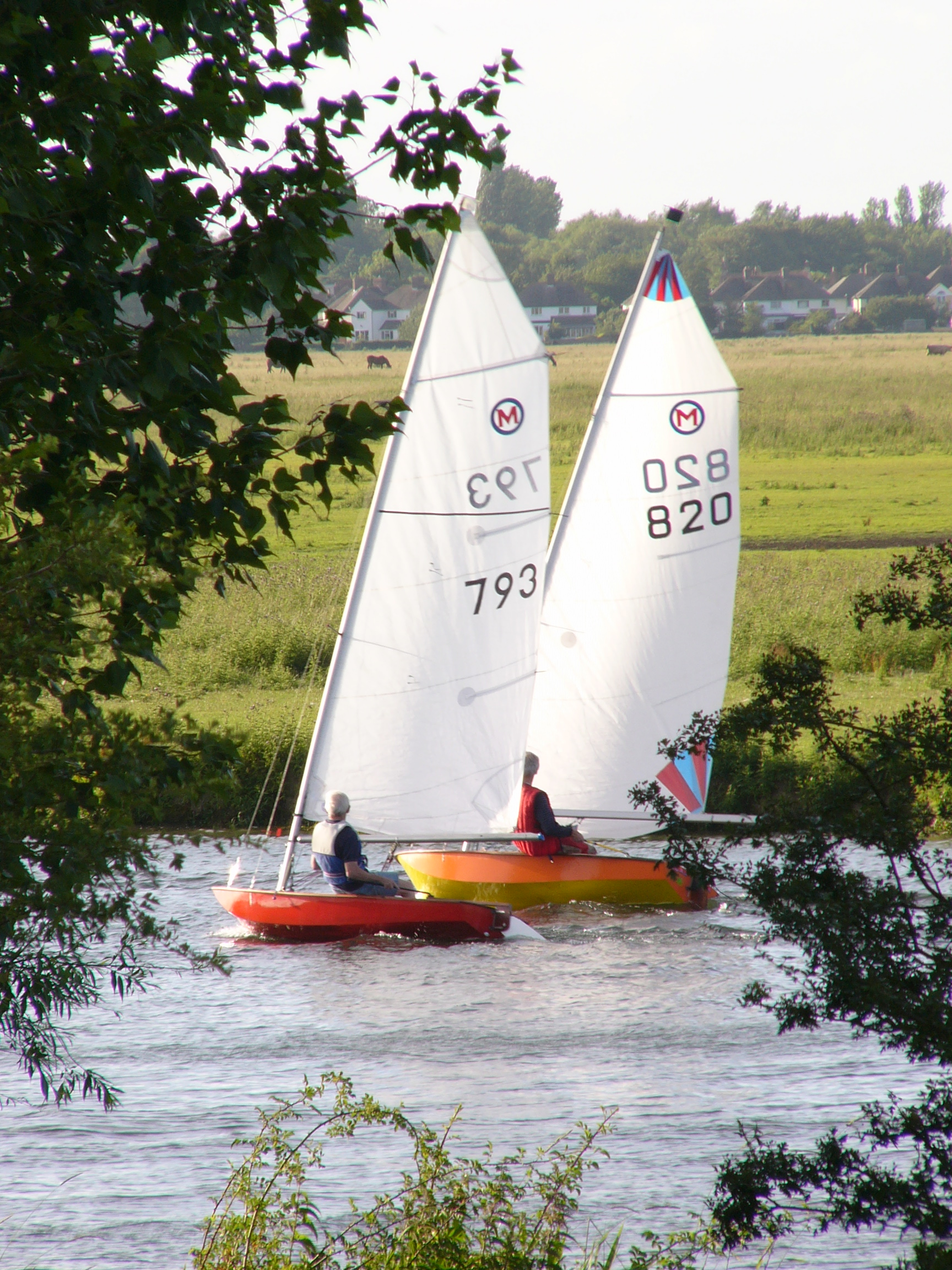
British Moths racing at Medley Sailing Club.

Medley Sailing Club is a dinghy sailing club on the River Thames, situated adjacent to Bossoms Boatyard opposite Port Meadow in Oxford, England.

The club is notable as the farthest upstream sailing club on the Thames and for its large fleet of British Moth boats. It was founded in 1937.

== See also ==
- Bossoms Boatyard
