= Boatswain (disambiguation) =

Boatswain is the seniormost rate of the deck department.

Boatswain or bosun may also refer to:

== Occupations ==
- Boatswain's mate (United States Navy), a job classification in the United States Navy
- Boatswain's mate (United States Coast Guard), a job classification in the United States Coast Guard
- Boatswain, a position on yacht racing crews
- Boatswain, the highest petty officer in Sea Scouting

== Animals ==
- Boatswain (bird), any species of gull of the genus Stercorarius
- Boatswain Bird Island, a small uninhabited island and nature reserve home to many endemic species of bird off the coast of Ascension Island

== Equipment ==
- Bosun, the NATO reporting name for the Soviet Tupolev Tu-14 bomber
- Bosun (dinghy), a type of sailing dinghy
- Bosun's chair, a type of harness that allows a crewmember to climb into the rigging and work safely on the sails, halyards, or other rigging
- Boatswain's call, a pipe or whistle used to issue commands on board ship

== The arts ==
- The Boatswain, a minor character in Shakespeare's The Tempest
- Boatswain, a Newfoundland dog kept by Lord Byron, who honored him by the poem "Epitaph to a Dog"

== Surname ==
- Jacqueline Boatswain (born 1962), English actress
- Quinton Boatswain (born 1990), Montserratian cricketer
