= British Moth =

Type of sailing dinghy

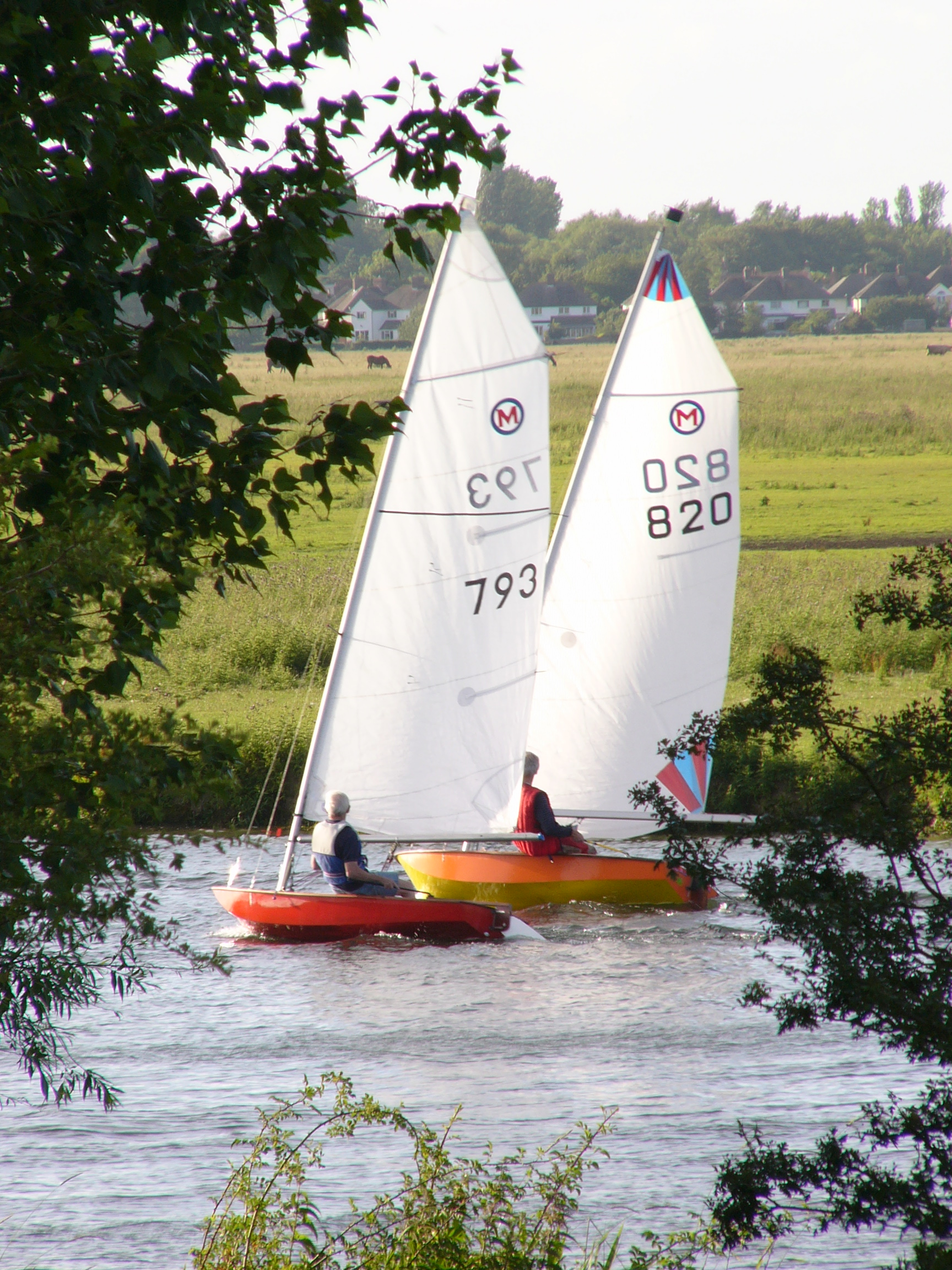
- Two British Moths racing at Medley Sailing Club

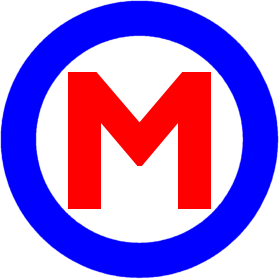

Boat
- Crew: 1

Hull
- Hull weight: 45 kg (99 lb)
- LOA: 3,353 mm (132.0 in)
- Beam: 1,275 mm (50.2 in)

Sails
- Mainsail area: 9.28 m^{2} (99.9 sq ft)

Racing
- RYA PN: 1164

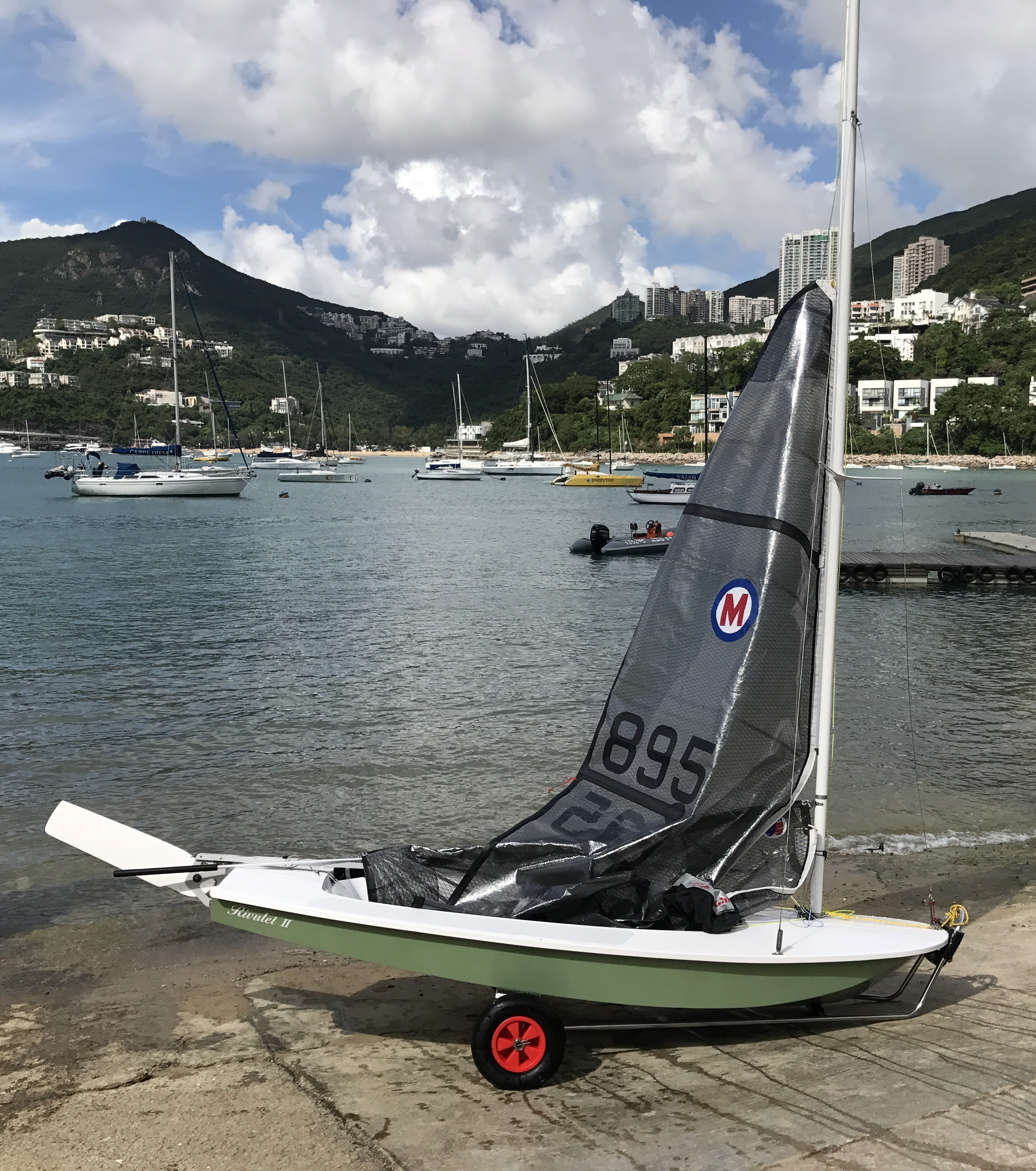
British Moth as seen in Hong Kong

British moth is an 11-foot (3.4 m) sailing dinghy designed in 1932 by Sydney Cheverton.

The first boats built were sailed on the Brent Reservoir in north London. British Moths were the first class to use this famous stretch of water for dinghy racing, and for a time it was known as the "Brent One Design". The British Moth National Championship trophy is still the Brent Cup.

After World War II, sailing was not resumed on the Brent Reservoir and the fleet became scattered. However, the British Moth continued to sail at other clubs in small numbers.

In 2004 the British Moth Boat Association funded the development of a new hull mould designed by Ian Howlett. This has seen renewed activity within club fleets and a number of river clubs taking up the class.

== See also ==
- Common origins with the International Moth (dinghy)
