= Sam Street (sailor) =

New Zealand Sailor

Personal information
- Nationality: New Zealand
- Born: 5 February 1977 (age 49) New Plymouth, Taranaki, New Zealand

Sailing career
- Sport: Sailing
- Class(es): Waszp, Moth, 29er, 420
Medal record
Sailing
Representing New Zealand
Gold medal – first place	2022 Lake Garda	Men's
Gold medal – first place	2023 Sorrento	Men's

Sam Street (Born c. 2002) is a New Zealand sailor. He was the first person to win two Waszp World Championships between 2022 and 2023. He was awarded the 2024 Male Sailor of the Year at the 7th annual Foiling Awards in Italy.

== Career ==
Street sails at New Plymouth Yacht Club in New Zealand.

Street was selected in 2017 to compete for New Zealand at the 2017 World Sailing Youth World Championships in Sanya, China. He crewed a 420, sailing alongside James Barnett where they finished 19th out of 26 boats.

At the 2019 Waszp Games in Perth, Western Australia, Street placed 21st out of 59 boats. In 2022, Street won his first Waszp Games in Lake Garda, Italy. The following year during the Waszp Games in Sorrento, Australia, he became the first person to win consecutive Waszp World Championships.
