= Moth (dinghy) =

Small development class sailing dinghy

International Moth
- Class symbol

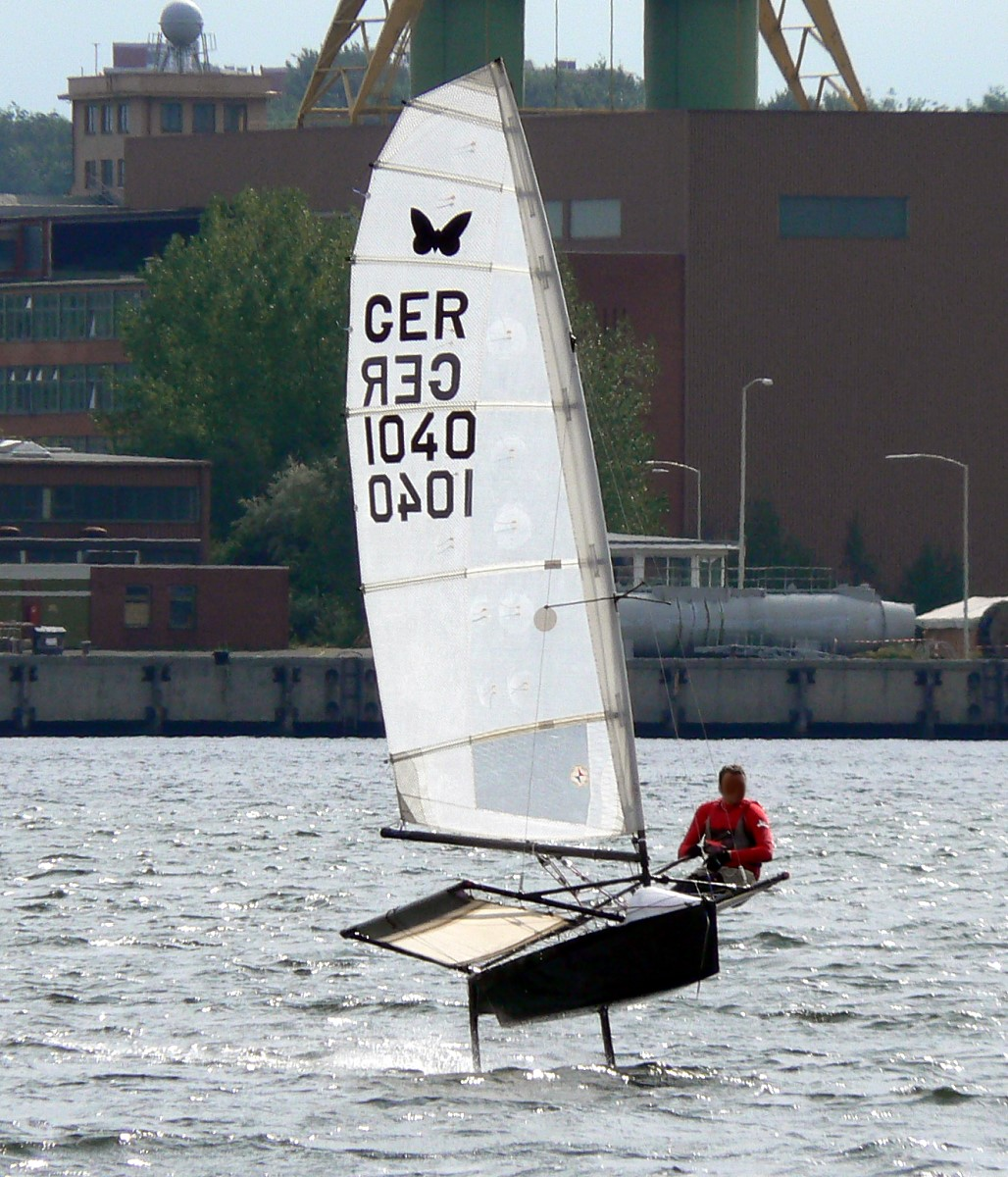
- An International Moth Class sailing hydrofoil flying over the water.

Development
- Design: Development Class
- Name: International Moth

Boat
- Crew: 1

Hull
- Type: Monohull
- Construction: Anything: Carbon Fiber, Fiberglass, Wood
- Hull weight: Unrestricted
- LOA: 4.355 m (14.29 ft)
- LWL: 3.355metres
- Beam: 2.25 m (7 ft 5 in)

Sails
- Total sail area: 8.25m2

Racing
- RYA PN: 600

The Moth is a small development class of sailing dinghy. Originally a small, fast home-built sailing boat designed to plane, since 2000 it has become an expensive and largely commercially produced boat designed to hydroplane on foils though many are still built at home, typically at much lower cost.

The pre-hydrofoil design Moths are still sailed and raced, but are far slower than their foiled counterparts.

== Types ==
There have been several types of Moth since the first use of the class name in the 1920s:

- The Classic Moth, a traditional dinghy with tighter design restrictions
- The British Moth, designed in 1932 and revived in 2004
- The Restricted Moth of the 1960s and 70s, with few design restrictions to allow for class development (International Moth in Australia and New Zealand)
- The Europa Moth, which became the Olympic Europe dinghy
- The New Zealand Mark 2 scow Moth, abundant in the 1970s
- The International Moth, a fast sailing hydrofoil dinghy with few design restrictions.

== History ==
=== Beginnings ===
The current International Moth is a result of merging two separate but similar historical developments. The first occurred in Australia in 1928 when Len Morris built a cat rigged (single sail) flat bottomed scow (horizontal bow rather than the "normal" vertical bow) to sail on Andersons' Inlet at Inverloch, a seaside resort 130 km from Melbourne. The scow was hard chined, 11 feet (3.4 m) long, with a single 7.4 square metres (80 sq ft) mainsail. The craft was named "Olive" after his wife. The construction was timber with an internal construction somewhat like Hargreave's box kite. "Olive's" performance was so outstanding, that a similar boat "Whoopee" was built. Len Morris then sold "Olive", and built another boat called "Flutterby", and with those three boats, the Inverloch Yacht Club was formed. Restrictions for the class known as the Inverloch Eleven Footer class were then drawn up, with the distinguishing characteristic that of being not a one-design boat but rather that of a boat permitting development within the set of design parameters.

At much the same time, 1929 in fact, halfway around the world another development class, the American Moth Boat was started by Captain Joel Van Sant and Ernest J. Sanders of Elizabeth City, North Carolina with the boat “Jumping Juniper” built of Atlantic White Cedar from the Great Dismal Swamp. The major difference between the Australian and American boats early on was that the American boat used only 72 square feet (6.7 m^{2}) of sail on a somewhat shorter mast. The US development class was formally organized in 1932 as the "National Moth Boat Association" and in 1935, due to increasing overseas interest, changed its name to the "International Moth Class Association" or IMCA.

In 1933, an American magazine, The Rudder, published an article dealing with the Moth Boat scene in the US. The Australians noted the similarities between the two groups of boats and intuitively realized that the name "Moth Boat" rolled more easily from the tongue than "Inverlock Eleven Footer Class", and changed the name of their class to Moth. The Australians also noted the differences, particularly in sail plan between the two boats, but since this was in the middle of the great depression, and the two groups were more than 20000 kilometres apart, no attempt was made to reconcile these differences. Thus two large Moth classes developed separately for over 30 years.

=== Early growth ===
The British Moth Class dates to the early 1930s. The class was restricted to a particular hull shape of a 1930s Vintage American Moth Boat, and is thus a one-design boat, not a development class which allows experimental development with shapes and materials.

The Victorian Moth Class Association was formed in Australia in 1936. After WWII, the NSW Moth Class Sailing Association was formed, with foundation members coming from Seaforth Moth Club and Woolahra Sailing Club. all other Australian states formed Moth Associations between 1956 and 1961. The Australian Yachting Federation (AYF) recognized the Australian Moth class as a national class in 1962, the first small boat class in Australia to be granted national status. Australian Moths were using pre-bent and wing masts in the 1950s. In the 1960s, Australian Moth sailors campaigned for rules changes that would permit the Australian Moths to compete in the IMCA's "World Championships".

European interest increased after the second world war. The European Moth clubs subscribed, more or less, to the US class rules. One European Moth design from the early 1960s, the "Europa Moth", broke away from the IMCA and formed the one-design Europe dinghy class. It was adopted as the woman's single-hander used in the Olympic Games from 1992 to 2004.

=== International Moth Class ===
In 1971 the US-based IMCA completed a phase-in of new rules which attempted a "marriage" of the IMCA and the Australian Moth. This amalgamation process had started at the annual IMCA meeting in 1965. New rules embraced the larger, more powerful high aspect, loose footed, fully battened rig of the Australian Moth. The new rules also permitted controversial hiking wings first seen on Moths from Switzerland. Finally, guided by the influential UK Moth sailor and WW2 war hero, Major Tony Hibbert, the rule change abolished the US centralized organization of the class in favor of an independent world body with equal-partner national associations. Each national association elected its own officers and world body representatives. The culmination of these changes was the recognition in 1972 of the IMCA by the International Yacht Racing Union (the forerunner of today's World Sailing) bound by the agreed upon new restrictions of the class (with metric measurement conversions) operating today. The moth class association that had originated in the US was now truly an international organization.

Being a development class, the Moth has evolved from a hull in the 1930s that could best be described as a heavy, narrow scow or a blunt nosed skiff, (weighing about 50 kg) to today's remarkable foilers with hull weights of under 10 kg. Designs have run the gamut from wide skiffs without wings, to lightweight scows, to wedge-shaped hulls characterized with narrow waterlines and hiking wings out to the maximum permitted beam. Likewise, the sail plan has evolved from cotton sails on wooden spars, through the fully battened Dacron sails on aluminum spars, to the windsurfer inspired sleeved film sails on carbon masts seen today.

In New Zealand the class reached its maximum popularity in the late 1960s and early 70s. The NZ Moth was standardized as a 41 kg flat bottom scow type known as the Mk2 using an alloy spars and a Dacron sail. The measured sail area was nominally 7.4 square metres but the actual area grew to about 8.2 square metres by 1970. Many hundreds were home made by amateurs. In addition there were a smaller number of International Moths of both scow and skiff type. Hulls were noticeably lighter -down to 23 kg for skiffs using plywood by 1970. The international yacht designer Bruce Farr built Moths to his own design in the 1967-1971 period when still a young school boy.

=== Rebirth ===
In the United States in the late 1970s participation in the International Moth class died and the class growth and interest moved to Europe and Australia. After ten years of little Moth activity in the US, several sailors started looking for old Moth Boats with the original US rig to restore and race. A newsletter was started to aid communication between like-minded Mothists. Racing of "Classic Moths" resumed in 1989 and in 1990 a new club was formed to govern racing and construction of Classic Moths. This club, the Classic Moth Boat Association or CMBA is the current governing body for the original US type of Moth Boat. The intent of the CMBA is to revive the original US version of the boat and update the rules so that development is permitted without allowing the boats to become too freakish. The IMCA rules from 1965, the final year prior to the phase-in of the Australian rig and wings were consulted as a starting point for reviving the US Moth. Those rules have been revised where necessary. Interest in Classic Moths has grown internationally, with new activity in Europe, primarily France.

== Moth firsts ==
The International Moth has fostered a number of achievements. In 1966–67, The King of Siam was involved in the building of three Moths and sailed them on the pond at Chitrlada Palace. The King raced for almost 20 years on his second moth called 'Super Mod' until his design and construction efforts were cut short by the 'press of royal duties'. In 1957 Patricia Duane became the first woman to win the Moth World Championship in her Cates-Florida design. In 1968 Marie Claude Fauroux became the first woman skipper to win a World dinghy racing title from an IYRU sanctioned international class, in her Duflos-designed moth. The International Moth was selected as an official training class for the Japanese Olympic sailing team, to hone their balance skills.

Since 2000 International Moths have begun using lifting hydrofoils on the daggerboard and rudder, which lift the entire hull and skipper above the water surface, dramatically reducing drag and increasing speed. The top speed achieved as of 2018 is 36.5 knots, the highest 10 second average of 35.9 knots (66.5 km/h) was recorded on 14 May 2014. This high speed is reflected in the International Moth's RYA Portsmouth Yardstick of 570, the fastest (As of 2016) of any sailing dinghy or multihull.

== Events ==
=== Competing for the Antonia Trophy from 1933–1964 and the Carling Trophy from 1965–present ===
Year	Gold	Silver	Bronze
1933 Elizabeth City, North Carolina, US	Harry Andrews (USA)		
1934 Atlantic City, New Jersey, US	Alfred Michael (USA)		
1935 Melbourne, Florida, US	Alfred Michael (USA)		
From 1936 to 1938 the international trophy was sailed for twice in the same year. At the 1938 AGM this was changed to once per year.			
1936a Melbourne, Florida, US	Joel Van Sant (USA)		
1936b Atlantic City, New Jersey, US	Joe Michael (USA)		
1937a Eau Gallie, Florida, US	Hanny Andrews (USA)		
1937b Atlantic City, New Jersey, US	Jimmy Van Sant (USA)		
1938a Miami, Florida, US	Harry Andrews (USA)		
1938b Norfolk, Virginia, US	Bill Cox (USA)		
1939 - the race was cancelled due to weather			
1941 Elizabeth City, North Carolina, US	Merv Wescoat Sr. (USA)		
1942-45 No races due to the war			
1946 Atlantic City, New Jersey, US	Russell Post (USA)		
1947 Atlantic City, New Jersey, US	Lloyd Morey (USA)		
1948 Atlantic City, New Jersey, US	Roscoe Stevenson (USA)		
1949 Elizabeth City, North Carolina, US	John White (USA)		
1950 Old Greenwich, Connecticut, US	Gene Willey (USA)		
1951 Norfolk, Virginia, US	Claiborne Coupland (USA)		
1952 Margate, New Jersey, US	Claiborne Coupland (USA)		
1953 Norfolk, Virginia, US	Lewis Twitchell (USA)		
1954 Miami, Florida, US	Warren Bailey (USA)		
1955 West Palm Beach, Florida, US	Charles Phillips (USA)		
1956 Miami, Florida, US	Donald Lapp (USA)		
1957 West Palm Beach, Florida, US	Patricia Duane (USA)		
1958 Brandt Beach, New Jersey, US	Kenneth Klare (USA)		
1959 Miami, Florida, US	Kenneth Klare (USA)		
1960 Bandol, France	Jacques Fauroux (FRA)		
1961 New Jersey, US	Ron Patterson (USA)		
1962 Ostend, Belgium	Serge Verneuil (FRA)		
1963 New York, New York, US	Bill Schill Jr. (USA)		
1964 Bandol, France	Jean-Pierre Rogge (SUI)		
1965 Cape May, New Jersey, US	Jean-Pierre Rogge (SUI)		
1966 Lausanne, Switzerland	Jean-Pierre Rogge (SUI)		
1967 Miami, Florida, US	Blair Fletcher (USA)	Doug Halsey (USA)	Claud Barth (SUI)
1968 Cannes, France	Marie-Claude Fauroux (FRA)		
1969 Ocean City, New Jersey, US	David McKay (AUS)		
1970 Victoria, Australia	David McKay (AUS)		
1971 France	Jacques Fauroux (FRA)		
1972 Switzerland	Jacques Fauroux (FRA)		

== See also ==
Similar boats

- Skimmer (dinghy)
- Waszp
