= Skimmer (dinghy) =

American sailboat design from 1933

Development
- Designer: William F. Crosby
- Location: United States
- Year: 1933
- No. built: "hundreds"
- Builder: homebuilt boat
- Name: Skimmer

Boat
- Displacement: 300 lb (136 kg)
- Draft: 4.50 ft (1.37 m) with centerboard down

Hull
- Type: Monohull
- Construction: Fiberglass
- LOA: 10.92 ft (3.33 m)
- Beam: 4.50 ft (1.37 m)

Hull appendages
- Keel: pivoting centerboard
- Ballast: none
- Rudder: transom-mounted rudder

Rig
- General: Cat boat
- P mainsail luff: 14.92 ft (4.55 m)
- E mainsail foot: 9.00 ft (2.74 m)

Sails
- Mainsail area: 65 sq ft (6.0 m^{2})
- Total sail area: 65 sq ft (6.0 m^{2})

The Skimmer is an American sailing dinghy, that was designed by William F. Crosby for amateur construction in 1933.

== Design ==
The Skimmer design conforms to the original Moth class rules, but with an emphasis on simplicity for ease of construction and to reduce building costs. Crosby was the editor of Rudder magazine at the time and had designed the Snipe in 1931. He published the plans for the Skimmer in the October and November 1933 issues of that magazine, during the height of the Great Depression, as a means of producing a sailboat for the least cost. As a consequence, hundreds of examples were built and they were raced as a class on the United States west coast and other places in the US.

The Skimmer is a small, single-handed, recreational dinghy, built predominantly of wood planking. It has a catboat single-sail rig, a single chine hull, a transom-hung rudder and a pivoting centreboard keel. It displaces 300 lb (136 kg) and carries no ballast.

The boat has a draft of 4.50 ft (1.37 m) with the centreboard extended and 1.83 ft (0.56 m) with it retracted, allowing beaching or ground transportation on a trailer or automobile roof rack.

== See also ==
- List of sailing boat types

Related development

- Moth (dinghy)
