= Bosun (dinghy) =

Type of sailing dinghy

Boat
- Crew: 2–4
- Draft: 1.37 m (4 ft 6 in)

Hull
- Hull weight: 168 kg (370 lb)
- LOA: 4.27 m (14.0 ft)
- Beam: 1.68 m (5 ft 6 in)

Sails
- Upwind sail area: 10.27 m^{2} (110.5 sq ft)

Racing
- RYA PN: 1198

The Bosun is a 14-foot GRP sailing dinghy originally created for the Royal Navy by designer Ian Proctor and built by Bossoms Boatyard in 1963. The design specification was for a robust dinghy, able to handle open seas, capable of carrying a crew of 3 to 4 people and be fast enough for a competent helm to enjoy sailing, whilst stable enough for a beginner to learn on.

The sailmark is a boatswain's call.
