= Brighton Sailing Club =

Brighton Sailing Club is a dinghy sailing club located on Brighton Beach, Brighton East Sussex UK.

== History ==
Brighton Sailing Club's founding date is not known precisely, written references to it have been found as far back as the 1870s. The Current "Brighton Sailing Club" was once called "Brighton Sailing and Angling Club" It also incorporates some elements of the former "Brighton Cruising Club" which folded in 1994.

"Brighton Sailing Club Minutes book 1872 - 1934" is known to exist in the Brighton and Hove Archives, but is not available for public view. The reference to "Annual Regatta" in a report Published in The Brighton Guardian Newspaper of Wednesday, October 16, 1872, would suggest that it was established enough to have annual events in the early 1870s.

== Racing ==
Racing occurs ever Sunday morning from the beginning of April till the End of October. Racing is divided into 2 fleets, catamaran and monohull. Results are calculated on handicap.
