= Waszp =

Sailboat class

WASZP
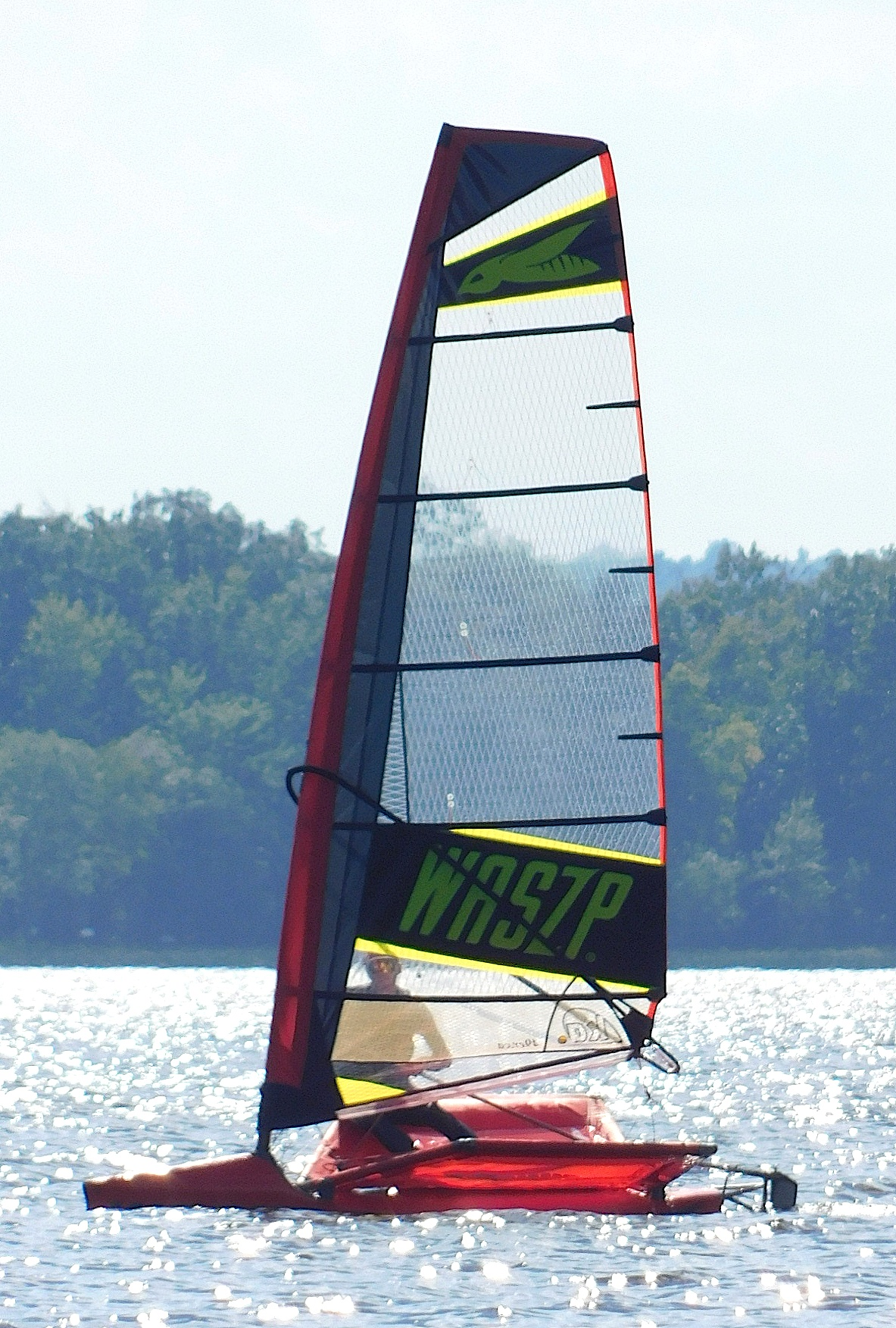

Development
- Designer: Andrew McDougall
- Location: Australia
- Year: 2016
- No. built: 1,750
- Builder: McConaghy Boats
- Role: Racer

Boat
- Crew: one
- Displacement: 106 lb (48 kg)
- Draft: 3.28 ft (1.00 m) (not foiling)

Hull
- Type: monohull
- Construction: Infused epoxy
- LOA: 11.00 ft (3.35 m)
- Beam: 7.38 ft (2.25 m) with wings extended

Hull appendages
- Keel: hydrofoil daggerboard
- Rudder: transom frame-mounted hydrofoil rudder

Rig
- Rig type: catboat rig

Sails
- Sailplan: catboat
- Mainsail area: 88.26 sq ft (8.200 m^{2})
- Total sail area: 88.26 sq ft (8.200 m^{2})

Racing
- Class association: One-design

The WASZP (/wɒsp/) is a single-handed, hydrofoiling dinghy, designed by Andrew McDougall in 2016 as a one-design racer for both youth and adult racing. The WASZP class includes 4 different rig sizes, each using the same hull with different wing designs. The design was named 2017 Best One-Design in Sailing World's Boat of the Year Awards.

The WASZP hull can be used for sail sizes of 8.2m, 7.5m, 6.9m, and 5.8m rigs, each designed for different age groups and sizes.

== Production ==
The design has been built by McConaghy Boats of Mona Vale, New South Wales, Australia since 2016 and remains in production. 750 boats had been built by May 2019 and more than 1,750 by end 2025.

There are WASZP sales agents in each continent excluding Africa. These brands do not make Waszps but act as distributors of the class.

== Design ==
The WASZP is a racing sailing dinghy, with the hull built predominantly of infused epoxy. It has a free-standing catboat rig, a concave plumb stem, a vertical transom, an aluminum frame-mounted, transom-hung, hydrofoil rudder controlled by a tiller and a retractable, aluminum, hydrofoil daggerboard. It has folding hiking wings and displaces 106 lb (48 kg). The design crew weight is 140 to 200 lb (64 to 91 kg).

The boat has a draft of 3.28 ft (1.00 m) with the daggerboard and rudder extended while not foiling and 8 in (20 cm) for launching with the daggerboard and rudder both retracted.

For sailing the design is equipped with variable angle hiking wings to adjust to skill level. There are also four different sail and mast combinations for smaller or less experienced sailors, with areas of 62.4 sq ft (5.80 m^{2}), 74.3 sq ft (6.90 m^{2}) and 88.3 sq ft (8.20 m^{2}).

The WASZP can start to hydrofoil in 8 kn (15 km/h) of wind, sustain hydrofoiling in as little as 5 kn (9 km/h) of wind and can reach a top speed of 24 kn (44 km/h).

The WASZP is similar to the developmental Moth class, but as a one-design class with aluminum foils it is half the price and thus appeals to a wider group of sailors.

== Operational history ==
The design is an accepted one-design class in the United States. US Sailing, describes it as "a singlehanded, one-design foiler. Designed by Andrew McDougall, the WASZP offers affordable foiling on a robust boat. The class has a place for everyone; there is a large contingent of sailors who race the boat at a high level while other sailors keep the boat at their local yacht club and go for a rip around the bay!"

The first regatta held in the US was in January 2017, at the Upper Keys Sailing Club in Florida and attracted eight boats and sailors.

A February 2017 review in Sail1Design noted, "the Waszp and the Moth are similar in their concepts, but for a couple reasons, the Waszp hits a market of different dinghy sailors. First, the Waszp is half the price of the Moth, you can buy a brand new Waszp in the US for $12,500. Unlike the Moth the Waszp is a one design class. With the Waszp you have adjustable wing angles allowing you to adjust for your skill and for storage. The Waszp comes with retractable alloy foils making it an easy boat to launch. With a free standing rig, you can rig up quickly and have a much easier time getting back into the boat after capsizing."

== Events ==
=== Waszp Games ===
==== Waszp Games - 8.2 Champions ====
===== Men's =====
Year	Gold	Silver	Bronze
2017 Lake Garda	Great Britain; Harry Mighell	United States; Reed Baldridge	Japan; Kohei Kajmoto
2019 Perth	Great Britain; Rory Hunter	Australia; Tom Trotman	Norway; Alexander Hogheim
2022 Lake Garda	New Zealand; Sam Street	Great Britain; Sam Whaley	Italy; Enzio Savolini
2023 Sorrento	New Zealand; Sam Street	Denmark; Magnus Overbeck	France; Hippolyte Gruet
2024 Sandefjord	Denmark; Magnus Overbeck	Norway; Markus Berthet	Italy; Federico Bergamasco
2025 Portland	Italy; Federico Bergamasco	Spain; Pablo Astiazaran Pérez-Cela	Spain; Antonio Gasperini
2026 Pensacola	United States; Gavin Ball	Spain; Antonio Gasperini	Spain; Pablo Astiazaran Pérez-Cela

===== Women's =====
Year	Gold	Silver	Bronze
2022 Lake Garda	New Zealand; Elise Beavis	Norway; Nora Doksrød	Norway; Mathilde Bregner Robertstad
2023 Sorrento	Great Britain; Hattie Rogers	New Zealand; Helena Sanderson	Australia; Tess Lloyd
2024 Sandefjord	Norway; Hedvig Doksrød	Norway; Marie Butler Wang	Norway; Nora Doksrød
2025 Portland	United States; Pearl Lattanzi	Australia; Mina Ferguson	Bermuda; Rachael Betschart

==== Waszp Games - 7.5 Champions ====
Year	Gold	Silver	Bronze
2025 Portland	Great Britain; Alex Jones	Norway; Martinius Melleby Hopstock	Norway; Pia Henriette Brun Tveita

==== Waszp Games - 6.9 Champions ====
Year	Gold	Silver	Bronze
2022 Lake Garda	Australia; Aidan Simmons	France; Maxime Donazzon	Italy; Piero Delneri
2023 Sorrento	Australia; Callum Simmons	Australia; Brenn Armstrong	Australia; Henri Levenspiel
2024 Sandefjord	Italy; Francesco Carrieri	Italy; Tommaso Geiger	Italy; Rebecca Geiger
2025 Portland	Italy; Olivia Castaldi	Italy; Jacopo Andrian	Italy; Pietro Moncada

== See also ==
- List of sailing boat types

Similar sailboats

- Moth (dinghy)
