= Pool skimmer =

Swimming pool cleaning device

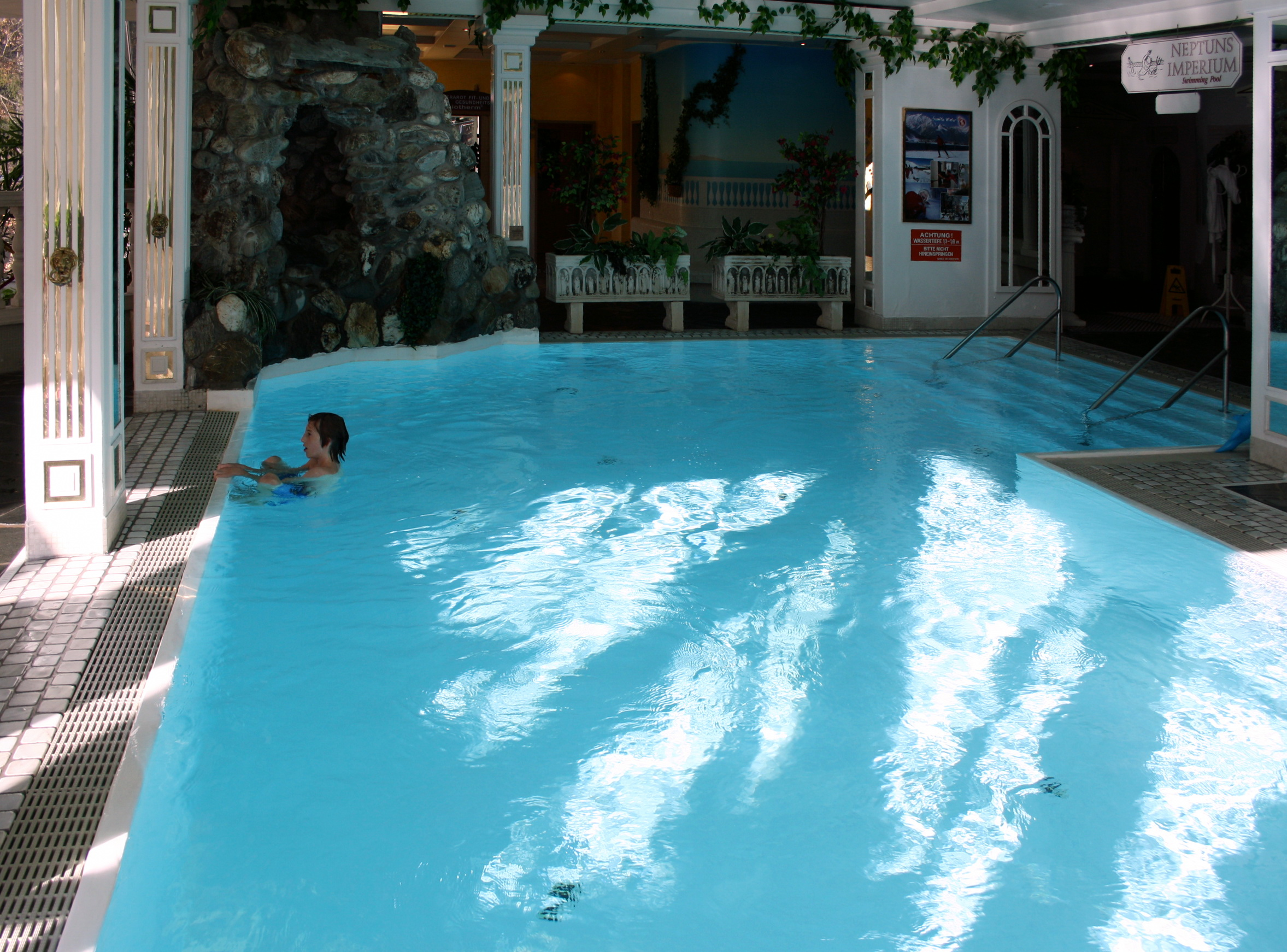
Pool with side skimmer

A skimmer or surface separator (it separates substances from the surface of a liquid) is an essential accessory for the maintenance and cleaning of the water in a swimming pool. It is used to remove all the surface dirt floating on the water surface, such as leaves, tanning oil and human secretions. These impurities remain suspended on the surface, affect the appearance of the water and are not always removed by the conventional vacuuming process. The skimmer is installed directly in the surface water suction system and also has the function of controlling the water level to prevent accidental overflows. In the United States and Portugal, the use of skimmers in the construction of swimming pools is mandatory, regulated and standardized by competent bodies.

== Types ==
There are different types of skimmers that can be used for different purposes. The most common types of skimmers include:

- Manual skimmers: These are basic skimmers that consist of a strong net strung on the end of a long pole. They are used to remove waste and pollutants from the surface of the water.
- Automatic skimmers: These are the most common variety of skimmers and are most likely seen running in any given pool. They are installed at surface level and are designed to remove debris and contaminants from the surface of the water.
- Standalone skimmers: These skimmers are designed to be used in conjunction with a pump and filter system. They are installed at surface level and are designed to remove debris and contaminants from the surface of the water

== Drainage opening ==
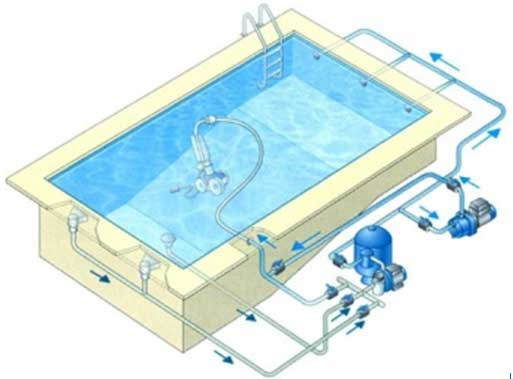
Skimmers distribution

Typically a skimmer draws water from the pool through a rectangular opening in the wall, at the top of the pool, connected through a device installed in one (or more) walls of the pool. The internal parts of the skimmer are accessed from the pool deck through a circular or rectangular cover, approximately one foot in diameter. If the pool's water pump is operational, it draws water from the pool through a hinged floating chute (which operates from a vertical position at a 90-degree angle to the pool, to prevent leaves and debris from being washed back into the pool by wave action), and down into a removable "skimmer basket", whose purpose is to catch leaves, dead insects and other larger floating debris.

The opening visible from the side of the pool is usually 1'0" (300 mm) wide by 6" (150 mm) high, which cuts the water halfway down the center of the opening. Skimmers with wider openings are called "wide angle" skimmers and can be up to 2'0" wide (600 mm). Floating skimmers have the advantage of not being affected by water level, as they adjust to work with the suction rate of the pump and will maintain optimal skimming regardless of water level, leading to a significantly reduced amount of biomaterial in the water. Skimmers should always have a leaf basket or filter between it and the pump to avoid clogging the pipes leading to the pump and filter.

== Consecutive dilution ==
A consecutive dilution system is usually provided to remove the organic waste in stages after passing through the skimmer. The waste material is trapped within one or more sequential skimmer basket sieves, each with a finer mesh to further dilute the size of the contaminant. Dilution here is defined as the act of making something weaker in strength, content or value.

The first basket is placed very close to the mouth of the skimmer. The second is connected to the circulation pump. Here 25% of the water drawn from the main drain at the bottom of the pool meets 75% drawn from the surface. The circulation pump sieve basket is easily accessible for maintenance and should be emptied daily. The third sieve is the sand unit. Here the smallest organic waste that has slipped through the previous sieves is trapped by the sand.

If not removed regularly, organic waste will continue to decompose and affect water quality. The dilution process makes it easy to remove organic waste. Ultimately, the sand screen can be backwashed to remove smaller trapped organic debris that otherwise leaches ammonia and other compounds into the recirculated water. These additional solutes eventually lead to the formation of disinfection byproducts (DBPs). The sieve baskets are easily removed each day for cleaning, as is the sand unit, which should be backwashed at least once a week. A perfectly maintained back-to-back dilution system dramatically reduces the build-up of chloramines and other DBPs. The water returned to the pool must have been cleaned of all organic debris larger than 10 microns in size.

== Recirculation jets ==
Return water from the consecutive dilution system passes through subsurface return jets. These are designed to impact a turbulent flow as the water enters the pool. This flow as a force is much smaller than the mass of water in the pool and takes the path of least pressure upwards where eventually the surface tension reforms it into a laminar flow at the surface.

As the returned water disturbs the surface, it creates a capillary wave. If the return jets are positioned correctly, this wave creates a circular motion within the surface tension of the water, allowing the surface to slowly circulate around the pool walls. Organic debris that floats to the surface through this capillary wave circulation slowly passes through the skimmer mouth, where it is attracted by laminar flow and surface tension over the skimmer dump. In a well-designed pool, the circulation caused by disturbed return water helps remove organic debris from the pool surface and directs it to be trapped within the back-dilution system for easy disposal.

Some return jets are equipped with a rotating filter. Used correctly, it induces deeper circulation, cleaning the water even more. Rotating the jet filters at an angle imparts rotation within the entire depth of the pool water. Orientation to the left or to the right would result in a clockwise or counterclockwise rotation, respectively. This has the advantage of cleaning the bottom of the pool and slowly moving the sunken inorganic debris into the main drain, where it is removed by the circulator basket screen.

In a properly constructed pool the circulation of water caused by the way it returns from the back-dilution system will reduce or even eliminate the need to vacuum the bottom. To obtain maximum rotational force on the main body of water, the back-to-back dilution system must be as clean and unblocked as possible to allow maximum flow pressure from the pump. As the water swirls, it also disturbs the organic debris in the lower layers of the water, forcing it up. The rotational force created by the pool's return jets is the most important part of cleaning the pool water and pushing organic debris through the skimmer mouth.

If the pool is designed and operated correctly, this circulation is visible and, after a period, reaches even the deepest end, inducing a low-speed vortex over the main drain due to suction. Correct use of return jets is the most effective way to remove disinfection byproducts caused by deeper decaying organic debris and bring them into the back-to-back dilution system for immediate disposal.

== Additional sanitation methods ==
Salt chlorination units, electronic oxidation systems, ionization systems, microbial disinfection systems with ultraviolet lamps and Tri-Chlor Feeders are other independent or auxiliary systems of skimmers for pool sanitation. Apart from this, the temperature of the water is very important, since if it remains high, it favors the proliferation of algae.

=== Mineral disinfectants ===
Mineral disinfectants for pools and spas use minerals, metals, or elements derived from the natural environment to produce water quality benefits that would otherwise occur with harsh or synthetic chemicals .

Companies cannot sell a mineral disinfectant in the United States unless it has been registered with the US Environmental Protection Agency (EPA). Two mineral disinfectants are currently registered with the EPA: one is a silver salt with a controlled release mechanism that is applied to calcium carbonate granules that help neutralize pH; the other uses a colloidal form of silver released into water from ceramic beads.

Mineral technology takes advantage of the cleaning and filtering qualities of common substances. Silver and copper are well-known oligodynamic substances that are effective in destroying pathogens. Silver has been shown to be effective against harmful bacteria, viruses, protozoa and fungi . Copper is widely used as an algaecide. Alumina derived from aluminates filters harmful materials at the molecular level and can be used to control the rate of delivery of desirable metals such as copper. Working through the pool or spa's filtration system, mineral disinfectants use combinations of these minerals to inhibit algae growth and remove contaminants.

Unlike chlorine or bromine, metals and minerals do not evaporate and do not degrade. Minerals can make water noticeably softer and, by replacing harsh chemicals in water, reduce the possibility of red eyes, dry skin and bad odors.

== Oil and grease on the surface ==
The density of fresh water is 1,000 kilograms per cubic meter, while the density of seawater varies between 1,020 and 1,030 kilograms per cubic meter. Oil is less dense than fresh water and seawater, so it floats in both types of water, but due to the difference in density the oil and fat particles, dispersed in the water, will reach the surface more quickly in a saltwater or seawater pool, being in both cases, "the only possible means" to remove them, to recirculate the water surface through skimmers .
