= 2017 Youth Sailing World Championships =

Event title
- Edition: 47th

Event details
- Venue: Sanya, China
- Dates: 9 - 16 December 2017

The 2017 Youth Sailing World Championships took place in Sanya, China from 9 to 16 December. It was the 47th edition of the Youth Sailing World Championships and the 5th to be held in Asia.

== Host selection ==
Three bids were placed to host the 2017 Youth Sailing World Championships.

2017 Youth Sailing World Championships bidding results
City	Country	Vote
Sanya	China	Selected as 2017 host
Mar del Plata	Argentina	Rejected
Melbourne	Australia	Rejected

== Competition format ==
=== Events and equipment ===
Event	Equipment
Boy's dinghy (single hander)	Laser Radial
Boy's dinghy (double hander)	420
Boy's skiff	29er
Boy's windsurfer	RS:X
Girl's dinghy (single hander)	Laser Radial
Girl's dinghy (double hander)	420
Girl's skiff	29er
Girl's windsurfer	RS:X
Open Multihull	Nacra 15

== Summary ==
=== Medal table ===
* Host nation (China)

Rank	Nation	Gold	Silver	Bronze	Total
1	United States	2	1	0	3
2	Israel	2	0	1	3
3	Italy	1	1	2	4
4	Australia	1	1	1	3
5	France	1	1	0	2
6	Great Britain	1	0	1	2
7	Switzerland	1	0	0	1
8	Russia	0	2	0	2
9	China*	0	1	1	2
10	Norway	0	1	0	1
10	Uruguay	0	1	0	1
12	Argentina	0	0	1	1
12	Belgium	0	0	1	1
12	Netherlands	0	0	1	1
Totals (14 entries)		9	9	9	27

=== Event medalists ===
==== Men's events ====
Event	First	Second	Third
Laser Radial	Maor Ben Hrosh; Israel	Daniil Krutskikh; Russia	Guido Gallinaro; Italy
420	Otto Henry; Rome Featherstone; Australia	Thomas Rice; Trevor Bornarth; United States	Ido Bilik; Noam Homri; Israel
29er	Théo Revil; Gautier Guevel; France	Mathias Berthet; Alexander Franks-Penty; Norway	Santiago Duncan; Elias Dalli; Argentina
RS:X	Yoav Cohen; Israel	Hao Chen; China	Sil Hoekstra; Netherlands

==== Women's events ====
Event	First	Second	Third
Laser Radial	Charlotte Rose; United States	Dolores Moreira; Uruguay	Daisy Collingridge; Great Britain
420	Carmen Cowles; Emma Cowles; United States	Violette Dorange; Camille Orion; France	Arianna Passamonti; Giulia Fava; Italy
29er	Margherita Porro; Sofia Leoni; Italy	Zoya Novikova; Diana Sabirova; Russia	Jasmin May Galbraith; Chloe Fisher; Australia
RS:X	Emma Wilson; Great Britain	Giorgia Speciale; Italy	Ting Yu; China

==== Open events ====
Event	First	Second	Third
Nacra 15	Max Wallenberg; Amanda Bjork-Anastassov; Switzerland	Shannon Dalton; Jayden Dalton; Australia	Lucas Claeyssens; Anne Vandenberghe; Belgium
