= Willem III Rowing Club =

Dutch rowing club

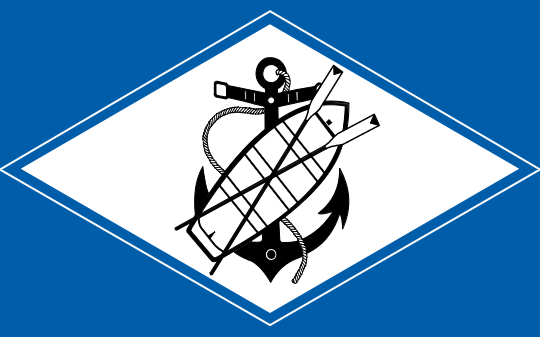

- The original logo of rowing club Willem III
- Location: Amsterdam, The Netherlands
- Home water: River Amstel
- Founded: 22 August 1882
- Membership: ~ 800
- Affiliations: Royal Dutch Rowing Federation
- Website: www.willem3.nl/english/

Events
- Head of the River Amstel

Notable members
- Nico Rienks, Ester Workel

Willem III Rowing Club is one of the largest and oldest rowing clubs in The Netherlands. It is located on the south side of Amsterdam, on the bank of the River Amstel. The club also has training facilities near the Bosbaan, the former Olympic course on the south-west side of Amsterdam. It is a member of the Royal Dutch Rowing Federation (KNRB).

Willem III members include famous rowers like Nico Rienks (gold medals at the 1996 and 1988 Olympic games), Ester Workel (silver medal at the 2004 Olympic games and 2005 World Championship and Herman Boelen (medal at the 1964 Olympic games).

Willem III organises the Head of the River Amstel every year. This is an annual rowing race between Amsterdam and Ouderkerk aan de Amstel Austel.

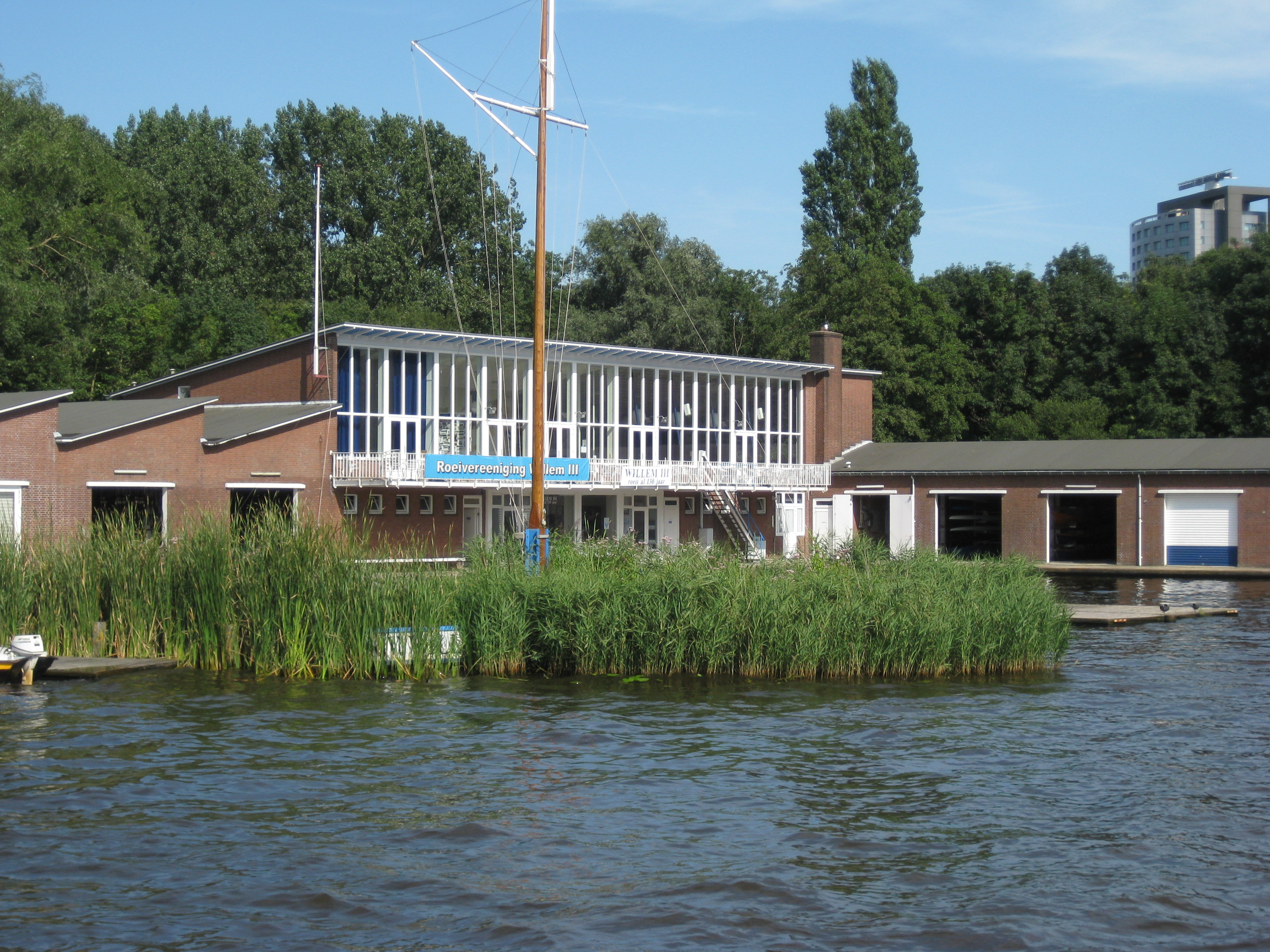
Willem III Rowing Club building

== History ==
Willem III Rowing Club was founded on 22 August 1882 by five friends: 15-year-old Arent Daniel Meyjes, his younger brother Gottfried and the brothers Egbert, Fije and Kees Bok. The boys were too young to join the existing rowing clubs, and therefore decided to start their own club. Their first base was the shipbuilding yard 'De Gouden Leeuw' the Meyjes brothers' father in the Kleine Kattenburgerstraat in Amsterdam. The fleet consisted of one (borrowed) sloop, the membership fee was 5-10 guildercent per week, and the annual budget amounted to 25 guilders. When naming their club after Willem III of the Netherlands, the boys did not realize that they needed permission from the monarch. They applied for this permission in 1885, which was granted on 18 December 1886 by the king.

=== Boathouses ===
In the following year the club and fleet grew, as a result of which the original boathouse became too small. The club moved to a new, larger, boathouse on the Hoogte Kadijk at the wharf 'Koning William'. Quickly, this housing became too small and in 1890 the club moved to a floating boathouse in the Oosterdok (opposite the current Maritime Museum. In 1896 the boathouse was moved to the river Amstel between the Govert Flinckstraat and the Stadhouderskade and in 1898 it was moved again to a spot close to the Amstelcanal. When Willem III existed 10 years it had 35 members and 60 supporters. By the turn of the century, the club had grown to 80 members and 77 supporters, and it owned 8 boats. In 1906, membership became open to women.

To handle the ongoing growth, a second floating boathouse was added in 1899. However, both boathouses were fragile. During a storm in 1903 one of the houses sank (and was lifted again) and in 1907 the other boathouse started to drift during a storm. To end these problems, the club started to construct a building close to the Amstel, opposite the Trompenburgstraat, which was opened in 1909. Because of the threat of war, the number of members dipped to 251 in January 1940, but subsequently growth picked up strongly, forcing the club to limit the number of members to 500. At the end of 1943, the Germans ordered the destruction of the housing of all rowing clubs on the banks of the Amstel, and in February 1944 the building on the Trompenburg was in fact demolished. Virtually the entire fleet was moved to an empty laundry in Nigtevecht. The members continued to gather in a rented room on the Ceintuurbaan.

After the war, Willem III moved to the building of the 'Deutscher Turn und Rudernverein' (designed for 80 members) that it had to share with RIC. There was a pressing lack of space, which made it necessary to construct a new club house. In 1947 the general meeting decided to build a new club house at the current location. After solving the financial problems, construction could start in 1953, partly thanks to important contributions from the members themselves. The building was opened on 19 June 1954.

=== Recent developments ===
The building was expanded in 1996, doubling the boat storage, and adding a room for indoor row trainers. In 2000 and 2001 the change rooms were completely renovated and made accessible to handicapped people. In 2005 the renovation of the second floor, including the club room, was started. Willem III started 2006 with 800 members and supporters.
