= 2024 Puig Women's America's Cup =

Female Sailing Race Competition

1st Puig Women's Americas Cup
Event information
- Dates: 5 to 13 October 2024
- Sponsor: Puig
- Host city: Barcelona, Catalonia, Spain
- Boats: NYYC American Magic (United States); Athena Pathway (United Kingdom); Luna Rossa Prada Pirelli Team (Italy); Alinghi Red Bull Racing (Switzerland); Orient Express Racing Team (France); Emirates Team New Zealand; Sail Team Barcelona (Spain); Jajo Team DutchSail (Netherlands); Concord Pacific Racing (Canada); AC Team Germany; Swedish Challenge powered by Artemis Technologies (Sweden); Andoo Team Australia
- Website: www.americascup.com

Results
- Winner: Luna Rossa Prada Pirelli Team

The 2024 Puig Women's America's Cup is the inaugural Women's Americas Cup and will be held in Barcelona, Catalonia, Spain. Both the Youth and Women's America's Cup will use the America's Cup 40 AC40 class, a one-design 12 m (40 ft) foiling monohull class. The yachts have 4 crew onboard (two helms and two trimmers) and many athletes also competed in the youth America's Cup. There are no age restrictions for athletes.

== Teams ==
Twelve teams are split into two pools of six for an initial fleet racing series, Group A contains clubs which entered into the America's Cup challenger series of that year and Group B contain clubs which have been invited to take part. After six fleet races the top three of each division then progress to the final series of 4 fleet races which decide the top two teams, who subsequently compete in a single match-race final to determine the overall winner of the event.

Nationality requirements stipulated in the protocol mean that 100% of the crew sailing each yacht in each race must be nationals of the country of the yacht club the team represents.

=== Group A ===
Team	Yacht Club	Skipper	Helmswomen
(United Kingdom) Athena Pathway	Royal Yacht Squadron	Hannah Mills	Hannah Mills; Tasha Bryant; Ellie Aldridge
Emirates Team New Zealand	Royal New Zealand Yacht Squadron		Jo Aleh; Liz Mackay; Erica Dawson
(Italy) Luna Rossa Prada Pirelli Team	Circolo della Vela Sicilia	Giulia Conti	Giulia Conti; Maria Vittoria Marchesini; Margherita Porro
(United States) NYYC American Magic	New York Yacht Club		Francesca Clapcich; Erika Reineke; Helena Scutt
(Switzerland) Alinghi Red Bull Racing	Société Nautique de Genève	Nathalie Brugger	Nathalie Brugger; Alexandra Stalder; Marie Mazuay
(France) Orient Express Racing Team	Société Nautique de Saint-Tropez	Manon Audinet	Audrey Ogereau; Pauline Coutois

=== Group B ===
Team	Yacht Club	Skipper	Helmswomen
(Spain) Sail Team Barcelona	Real Club Náutico de Barcelona	Silvia Mas	Silvia Mas; Neus Ballester
(Netherlands) Jajo Team DutchSail	Koninklijke Roei- en Zeilvereniging De Maas; Koninklijke Nederlandsche Zeil- en Roeivereeniging		Willemijn Offerman; Odile van Aanholt; Ismene Usman
(Canada) Concord Pacific Racing	Royal Vancouver Yacht Club	Isabella Bertold	Isabella Bertold; Ali ten Hove; Maggie Drinkwater
AC Team Germany	Kieler Yacht-Club; Norddeutscher Regatta Verein	Carolina Werner	Tina Lutz; Maru Scheel; Victoria Jurczok
(Sweden) Swedish Challenge powered by Artemis Technologies	Royal Gothenburg Yacht Club; Royal Swedish Yacht Club		Julia Gross; Vilma Bobeck; Lovisa Karlsson
Andoo Team Australia	Cruising Yacht Club of Australia	Olivia Price	Laura Harding; Olivia Price

== Results ==
Points are awarded to each of the finishing boats with 1st place awarded 10 pts, 2nd awarded 7, 3rd 5, 4th 3, 5th 2 and 6th 1. To progress to the semi-final series, teams must rank in the top three of their qualification series group. Likewise to qualify for the final, teams must rank in the top two of the semi-final series.

=== Qualification Series ===
==== Group A ====
Pos	Team							
Pos	Team	R1	R2	R3	R4	R5	R6	Points
1	(United Kingdom) Athena Pathway	1	3	2	2	2	1	46
2	(Italy) Luna Rossa Prada Pirelli Team	4	1	1	1	4	4	39
3	Emirates Team New Zealand	2	4	3	4	5	2	27
4	(Switzerland) Alinghi Red Bull Racing	3	2	6	5	1	5	27
5	(United States) NYYC American Magic	5	6	5	6	3	3	16
6	(France) Orient Express Racing Team	6	5	4	3	6	INR^{††}	16
Citation:

==== Group B ====
Pos	Team									
Pos	Team	R1	R2	R3	R4	R5	R6	R7	R8	Points
1	(Sweden) Swedish Challenge powered by Artemis Technologies	1	INR	5	3	1	1	1	1	61
2	(Netherlands) Jajo Team DutchSail	5	3	1	1	3	3	2	2	51
3	(Spain) Sail Team Barcelona	2	2	2	4	4	2	3	3	44
4	Andoo Team Australia	3	1	6	2	2	4	4	4	39
5	(Canada) Concord Pacific Racing	4	4	3	6	6 (DNF)^{*}	5 (DNS)^{**}	5	6 (DNS)	13
6	AC Team Germany	6	DSQ ^{†}	4	5	5	6 (DNS)	6	5	10
Citation:

^{†} AC Team Germany were disqualified from the race and awarded 0 pts.

^{††} Instructed Not to Race (INR) – Teams that are instructed not to race by the racing committee are awarded 4 points.

^{*} Did Not Finish (DNF) – Teams are still awarded points for the place they would come in the race.

^{**} Did Not Start (DNS) – Teams are awarded no points.

=== Final series ===
Pos	Team					
Pos	Team	R1	R2	R3	R4	Points
1	(United Kingdom) Athena Pathway	3	2	1	3	27
2	(Italy) Luna Rossa Prada Pirelli Team	2	1	2	4	27
3	(Spain) Sail Team Barcelona	1	6	4	1	24
4	(Sweden) Swedish Challenge powered by Artemis Technologies	6	3	5	2	15
5	Emirates Team New Zealand	4	5	3	5	12
6	(Netherlands) Jajo Team DutchSail	5	4	6	6	7
Citation:

=== Final ===
Team	1
(United Kingdom) Athena Pathway	
(Italy) Luna Rossa Prada Pirelli Team	●
Citation:
