= 2024 Unicredit Youth America's Cup =

Youth Sailing Race Competition

3rd Youth Americas Cup
Event information
- Type: Fleet racing and Match racing
- Dates: 5–13 October 2024
- Sponsor: UniCredit
- Host city: Barcelona, Spain
- Boats: NYYC American Magic (United States); Athena Pathway (United Kingdom); Luna Rossa Prada Pirelli Team (Italy); Alinghi Red Bull Racing (Switzerland); Orient Express Racing Team (France); Emirates Team New Zealand; Sail Team Barcelona (Spain); Jajo Team DutchSail (Netherlands); Concord Pacific Racing (Canada); AC Team Germany; Swedish Challenge powered by Artemis Technologies (Sweden); Andoo Team Australia
- Former names: Red Bull Youth America's Cup
- Website: www.americascup.com/events/unicredit-youth-americas-cup

Results
- Winner: Luna Rossa Prada Pirelli Team

Succession
- Previous: 2017
- Next: 4th

The 2024 Unicredit Youth America's Cup is the 3rd Youth Americas Cup and will be held in Barcelona, Spain, from 17 to 26 September. Both the Youth and Women's America's Cup will use the America's Cup 40 AC40 class, a one-design 12 m (40 ft) foiling monohull class. The yachts have 4 crew onboard (two helms and two trimmers) and teams can have mixed crews with many female athletes competing in the youth and 2024 PUIG Women's America's Cup. All athletes must be aged between 18 and 25.

== Teams ==
Twelve teams are split into two pools of six for an initial fleet racing series, Group A contains clubs which entered into the America's Cup challenger series of that year and Group B contain clubs which have been invited to take part. The top three of each division then progress to the final series of 3–4 fleet races which decide the top two teams, who subsequently compete in a single match-race final to determine the overall winners of the event.

=== Group A ===
Team	Yacht Club	Skipper	Helm
(United Kingdom) Athena Pathway	Royal Yacht Squadron	Nick Robins	Nick Robins; James Grummet
Emirates Team New Zealand	Royal New Zealand Yacht Squadron		Leo Takahashi; Seb Menzies
(Italy) Luna Rossa Prada Pirelli Team	Circolo della Vela Sicilia		Marco Gradoni; Gianluigi Ugolini
(United States) NYYC American Magic	New York Yacht Club		Harry Melges; Kyle Navin
(Switzerland) Alinghi Red Bull Racing	Société Nautique de Genève	Jann Schüpbach	Arnaud Grange; Andrea Aschieri; Joshua Richner
(France) Orient Express Racing Team	Société Nautique de Saint-Tropez	Enzo Balanger	Matisse Pacaud; Enzo Balanger

=== Group B ===
Team	Yacht Club	Skipper	Helmswomen
(Spain) Sail Team Barcelona	Real Club Náutico de Barcelona		
(Netherlands) Jajo Team DutchSail	Koninklijke Roei- en Zeilvereniging De Maas; Koninklijke Nederlandsche Zeil- en Roeivereeniging		
(Canada) Concord Pacific Racing	Royal Vancouver Yacht Club	Andrew Wood	
AC Team Germany	Kieler Yacht-Club; Norddeutscher Regatta Verein		Julian Hoffman
(Sweden) Swedish Challenge powered by Artemis Technologies	Royal Gothenburg Yacht Club Royal Swedish Yacht Club		Oscar Engström; Lugvig Lindqvist; Hanno Seifert
Andoo Team Australia	Cruising Yacht Club of Australia		Cole Tapper

== Results ==
Points are awarded to each of the finishing boats with 1st place awarded 10 pts, 2nd awarded 7, 3rd 5, 4th 3, 5th 2 and 6th 1. To progress to the semi-final series teams must rank in the top three of their qualification series group. Likewise to qualify for the final teams must rank in the top two of the semi-final series.

=== Qualification series ===
==== Group A ====
Pos	Team									
Pos	Team	R1	R2	R3	R4	R5	R6	R7	R8	Points
1	(Italy) Luna Rossa Prada Pirelli Team	1	2	1	1	1	1	6	3	63
2	(United States) NYYC American Magic	2	1	INR^{†}	INR	2	3	4	1	50
3	(United Kingdom) Athena Pathway	4	3	2	2	6	5	3	2	37
4	(France) Orient Express Racing Team	INR	INR	INR	INR	3	4	1	DNF^{††}	35
5	Emirates Team New Zealand	3	4	3	4	5	2	2	5	34
6	(Switzerland) Alinghi Red Bull Racing	5	5	4	3	4	6	5	4	23
Citation:

^{†} Instructed Not to Race (INR) – Teams that are instructed not to race by the racing committee are awarded 4 points.
^{††} Did Not Finish (DNF) – Team withdrew part way through the race. The team is still awarded 1 pt.

==== Group B ====
Pos	Team									
Pos	Team	R1	R2	R3	R4	R5	R6	R7	R8	Points
1	(Sweden) Swedish Challenge powered by Artemis Technologies	3	2	1	1	1	1	4	2	62
2	(Spain) Sail Team Barcelona	1	4	5	2	3	6	2	1	45
3	Andoo Team Australia	5	1	4	3	2	3	1	6	43
4	(Canada) Concord Pacific Racing	2	5	2	6	5	5	3	3	31
5	(Netherlands) Jajo Team DutchSail	DNS^{*}	3	3	5	INR	2	5	4	28
6	AC Team Germany	4	6	6	4	4	4	6	5	17
Citation:

^{*} Did Not Start (DNS) – Teams are awarded no points.

=== Semi-final series ===
Pos	Team					
Pos	Team	R1	R2	R3	R4	Points
1	(Italy) Luna Rossa Prada Pirelli Team	2	2	1	2	31
2	(United States) NYYC American Magic	5	1	3	4	20
3	(United Kingdom) Athena Pathway	3	3	2	5	19
4	(Sweden) Swedish Challenge powered by Artemis Technologies	1	5	4	6	16
5	Andoo Team Australia	6	6	5	1	14
6	(Spain) Sail Team Barcelona	4	4	6	3	12
Citation:

=== Final ===
Team	1
(Italy) Luna Rossa Prada Pirelli Team	●
(United States) NYYC American Magic	
Citation:
