= Varsity (rowing regatta) =

Dutch rowing regatta

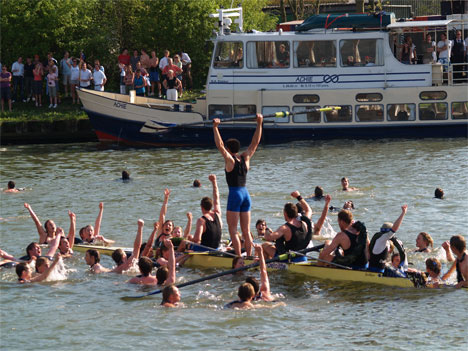
- The Skadi four and supporters in the water after winning the 124th Varsity in 2007.
- Frequency: Annual
- Locations: Houten, Netherlands
- Years active: 1878–present
- Previous event: 29 March 2026
- Next event: 4 April 2027
- Participants: approx. 200 crews
- Organiser: KNSRB and U.S.R. Triton
- Website: www.knsrb.nl/varsity/algemene-informatie/algemene-informatie

The Varsity is a rowing regatta on the Amsterdam–Rhine Canal in Houten, Netherlands each Spring. The Varsity is the oldest and most prestigious student rowing regatta in the Netherlands.

The Varsity is one of the few rowing races that is exclusive to students and a fever-pitch rivalry exists between participants. Traditional elements are combined with contemporary rowing races. For instance, while rowing crews defend the honour of the club on the water, spectators on the dike are traditionally brawling with equal fanaticism. The main event is the Oude Vier (Varsity Four, literally 'Old Four') which is rowed in a 4+ over a distance of 3 km. All other events row the standard 2 km distance in common race rowing classes such as the 4+, 4-, 2- and single scull. Some races are in traditional clinker-built boats.

The Varsity has influenced many of the traditions in student rowing in the Netherlands.

== Victories ==
Two races in 1915 and 1916 are not counted towards the total score because of World War I in the Netherlands. During the COVID-19 pandemic the race also couldn't be rowed.

Total wins up to 2026:

Club	City	Number of wins	Latest win
Nereus	Amsterdam	45	2022
Laga	Delft	31	2026
Njord	Leiden	21 1/2 (*) (Note: Caused by the dead-heat of 1960)	1988
Triton	Utrecht	18	2024
Skadi	Rotterdam	9	2015
Aegir	Groningen	6	1982
Orca	Utrecht	5	2004
Argo	Wageningen	1 1/2	1961
Euros	Enschede	1	1995
Okeanos	Amsterdam	1	1989
Skøll	Amsterdam	1	2025

== History ==
=== Prelude ===
The history of the Varsity began with the establishment of the first student rowing club in the Netherlands. On 5 June 1874 J.W.T. Cohen Stuart founded K.S.R.V. "Njord" in Leiden with the patronage of Prince Henry of the Netherlands.This inspired other students to form their own rowing clubs. In 1876, D.S.R.V. Laga was founded in Delft. In 1878 G.S.R. Aegir was founded in Groningen. All these student rowing clubs of this period started as subdivisions of bigger and older student corporations like Vindicat atque Polit.

In England, rowing was a more developed sport at the time and already had a tradition of university races. The Boat Race between Oxford and University inspired a similar Dutch race. In 1878 Njord challenged Laga. Laga accepted the challenge and raced against Njord on 2 July 1878 on the 'Galgewater' (Gallows water) in Leiden. The race contained two turning-buoys and was 3200 meters long. Laga won by 12 seconds. The rematch was two years later, and has been held almost every year since then.

Members of Aegir dispute the official history and claim that both clubs decided to race in celebration of the founding of Aegir in February 1878.

=== The early days ===
A third competitor joined in 1882, U.S.R. Triton from Utrecht. This was a key point in the history of the Varsity and student rowing in the Netherlands. The three clubs decided to form the Koninklijke Nederlandsche Studenten Roeibond or KNSRB (Dutch Student Rowing Association). This body would be responsible for the development of student rowing and the organisation of the Varsity.

The first official Varsity was held on 30 June 1883. In this race, the turning-buoy was a decisive factor, as Laga and Triton collided at the turn did not finish the race.

In the following years, the race grew in size. There were more boat classes, more competitors and more spectators. The race moved to Haarlem in 1885 after residents complained about the disturbance of the Sunday rest. In Haarlem was it possible to race without buoys. Rowing crews started to train daily for the race. This was unusual at the time and resulted in some crews dominating for years. The race moved again in 1902 to the Zweth, a brook between Delft and Rotterdam. Because of the narrow waterway, only two crews could race at a time. Qualifications for the final were necessary until another move in 1914 to the North Sea Canal.

Aegir joined the KNSRB and participated in the Varsity for the first time in 1918, 40 years after its founding. The long distance from Groningen to the other clubs had prevented them for joining earlier. They won their first varsity with a six-boat-length lead. but it would take another 38 years for their second victory.

=== 1930–1940 ===
Varsity 1938

In 1930, some drunken Varsity spectators infiltrated the Royal Palace of Amsterdam, which led to questions in parliament. The race was relocated to the Bosbaan in Amstelveen in 1937 to avoid further trouble near the palace. This sparked a huge controversy in the rowing world, as the Bosbaan was only 2000 meters long instead of the traditional 3000 meters. Furthermore, the course was too narrow to fit the five boats of the competition. Honorary members of the KNSRB resigned over the dispute, and the 1937 winners refused their prize in protest of the new location. At the same time it was debated to mark the coxless four as the main event instead of the coxed four. Laga proposed that the race be moved to a new location, and Triton suggested Jutphaas as a new venue for the races. Triton swore an oath to organise the Varsity on behalf of the KNSRB, as long as the race was rowed in Utrecht. They have kept this oath to this day.

=== Second World War ===
The Varsity was banned under German occupation. However, Triton was allowed to organise the Varsity in 1941 as part of their lustrum. Later that year, after the German occupiers banned Jewish students from eductation, all student rowing clubs closed their gates. A mock Varsity was held in a Japanese internment camp. Representatives of the student rowing clubs created a game where dice determined the outcome. They used cardboard to make a 5-meter track, boats, finish tower and even painted the boats in the correct colours. Members and supporters of the student rowing clubs created the traditional outfit and practised the anthem of the club. Representatives of each pre-war KNSRB club (Njord, Laga, Triton, Nereus, Aegir) competed for the main event, while Argo, a non-KNSRB club, only could participate in the skiff, double four and in the eight. Triton won the race after a thrilling race against Laga.

=== 1946–1959 ===
Although Nereus, Aegir and Argo lost their boathouses during the war, all KNSRB-clubs (Including Argo for the first time) competed in the 1946 Varsity. Triton won the race, but this Varsity is mostly remembered because the KNSRB received the honorary title 'Koninklijke' (Royal). Since then it's the KNSRB. After the war the Varsity gained more prestige and the NOS started televise the race.

=== 1960–present ===
Varsity 1960

In the 1960s the role of the parent societies, the student corporations, changed. Independent rowing clubs were founded, without a student corporation as a parent. These rowing clubs were not allowed to join the KNSRB, but needed representation. Therefore, at the initiative of the KNSRB, all student rowing clubs formed the NSRF (Nederlandse Studenten Roeifederatie (Dutch Student Row Federation). KNSRB clubs became members of both organisations.

In 1973, the KNSRB clubs decided that all NSRF clubs should be able to participate in the Varsity. This led to major changes in the race. For the first time since 1914, qualifications were necessary. The big culture difference between the new and the old clubs proved to be a difficult challenge for both sides. New clubs did not like the distance and distinctive race rules. They also objected to the traditional fighting and brawling between KNSRB club members. KNSRB members showed their disappointment by wearing black belts during the first 'joined' Varsity. Since then the relationship normalised, although many KNSRB members misbehaved when a non-KNSRB club, Orca, won the varsity in 1980.

In the 1970s, club members of Laga, Aegir, Skadi and Njord began to brawl earlier in the rowing season for the expected victory in the Varsity. They would compete for a (frozen) chicken that hung from the ceiling in Njord's boathouse. This tradition, called 'kipvechten' (chicken fighting) was supposed to predict the Varsity winner. In the mid-2000s Njord decided to stop hosting this event due to many injuries and damages to their boathouse.

The Varsity moved to their current location on the Amsterdam-Rhine Canal in 1971. Since then the race has stayed in Houten except for a one-year return to the Bosbaan.

During the 134st Varsity in 2017 the organisation introduced a second main event: the women's coxless four. This first race was won by Nereus.

== Visual record ==
The oldest sport-related film material in the Netherlands is that of the Varsity of 28 May 1905.

== See also ==
- Head of the River Amstel

== Notes and references ==
Notes
