= Athena Pathway =

British sailing team

Career
- Yacht club: Royal Yacht Squadron (2024-)
- Established: 2022
- Nation: United Kingdom
- Team principal(s): Sir Ben Ainslie; Hannah Mills

Yachts
- Sail no.: Boat name

Athena Pathway is a British sailing team created in 2022 to compete for the 2024 Youth and Women's editions of the America's Cup.

The team was established in 2022 with the ambition of building a Long-Term, Equitable Pathway in High-Performance Sailing an winning the 2024 Youth and Women's America's Cup for Great Britain and to 'bring the cup home' to the United Kingdom and also . In 2024 the team challenged for the Youth and Women's America's Cup in Barcelona, representing the Royal Yacht Squadron.

== Formation and facilities ==
Athena Pathway, representing the Royal Yacht Squadron, was launched in August 2022 by Hannah Mills OBE and Sir Ben Ainslie, two of Britain's most successful Olympic sailors, with the aim of fast-tracking development in high-performance sailing and bringing diversity to the sport and the UK marine industry more broadly.

Led by Mills, the Pathway was established for female and youth athletes. Hoping to fast-track development in professional sailing, level the playing field in high-performance foiling and bring equality and diversity into the sport at its highest level, both on and off the water. The core of the pathway is a commitment to sustainability, with an ethos of 'People, Planet and Purpose', encouraging athletes to use their voices in the fight against climate change.

== 2024 ==
=== UNICREDIT Youth America's Cup ===
==== Crew ====
Sailor	Position
(United Kingdom) Nick Robins	Skipper & Helm
(United Kingdom) James Grummett	Helm
(United Kingdom) Alex Hughes	Trimmer
(United Kingdom) Matt Beck	Trimmer
(United Kingdom) Hattie Rogers	Trimmer
Citation:

==== Results ====
Athena Pathway ranked 3rd over all in their qualification group but missed out on qualifying for the final by 2 points.

===== Qualification Series =====
Pos	Team									
Pos	Team	R1	R2	R3	R4	R5	R6	R7	R8	Points
1	(Italy) Luna Rossa Prada Pirelli Team	1	2	1	1	1	1	6	3	63
2	(United States) NYYC American Magic	2	1	INR^{†}	INR	2	3	4	1	50
3	(United Kingdom) Athena Pathway	4	3	2	2	6	5	3	2	37
4	(France) Orient Express Racing Team	INR	INR	INR	INR	3	4	1	DNF^{††}	35
5	Emirates Team New Zealand	3	4	3	4	5	2	2	5	34
6	(Switzerland) Alinghi Red Bull Racing	5	5	4	3	4	6	5	4	23
Citation:

^{†} Instructed Not to Race (INR) - Teams that are instructed not to race by the racing committee are awarded 4 points.
^{††} Did Not Finish (DNF) - Team withdrew part way through the race. The team is still awarded 1 pt.

==== Semi-Final Series ====
Pos	Team					
Pos	Team	R1	R2	R3	R4	Points
1	(Italy) Luna Rossa Prada Pirelli Team	2	2	1	2	31
2	(United States) NYYC American Magic	5	1	3	4	20
3	(United Kingdom) Athena Pathway	3	3	2	5	19
4	(Sweden) Swedish Challenge powered by Artemis Technologies	1	5	4	6	16
5	Andoo Team Australia	6	6	5	1	14
6	(Spain) Sail Team Barcelona	4	4	6	3	12
Citation:

=== PUIG Women's America's Cup ===
==== Crew ====
Sailor	Position
(United Kingdom) Hannah Mills	Skipper & Helm
(Australia) Natasha Bryant	Helm
(United Kingdom) Ellie Aldridge	Helm
(United Kingdom) Hannah Diamond	Trimmer
(United Kingdom) Saskia Clark	Trimmer
(Scotland) Anna Burnet	Trimmer
(United Kingdom) Hattie Rogers	Trimmer
Citation:

==== Results ====
Athena Pathway came 1st overall in both their qualification group and the semi-final series. However, they lost the 'winner takes all' match race to Luna Rossa Prada Pirelli.

===== Qualification Series =====
Pos	Team							
Pos	Team	R1	R2	R3	R4	R5	R6	Points
1	(United Kingdom) Athena Pathway	1	3	2	2	2	1	46
2	(Italy) Luna Rossa Prada Pirelli Team	4	1	1	1	4	4	39
3	Emirates Team New Zealand	2	4	3	4	5	2	27
4	(Switzerland) Alinghi Red Bull Racing	3	2	6	5	1	5	27
5	(United States) NYYC American Magic	5	6	5	6	3	3	16
6	(France) Orient Express Racing Team	6	5	4	3	6	INR^{††}	16
Citation:

===== Semi-Final Series =====
Pos	Team					
Pos	Team	R1	R2	R3	R4	Points
1	(United Kingdom) Athena Pathway	3	2	1	3	27
2	(Italy) Luna Rossa Prada Pirelli Team	2	1	2	4	27
3	(Spain) Sail Team Barcelona	1	6	4	1	24
4	(Sweden) Swedish Challenge powered by Artemis Technologies	6	3	5	2	15
5	Emirates Team New Zealand	4	5	3	5	12
6	(Netherlands) Jajo Team DutchSail	5	4	6	6	7
Citation:

===== The Final =====
Team	1
(United Kingdom) Athena Pathway	
(Italy) Luna Rossa Prada Pirelli Team	●
Citation:
