= Leo Takahashi =

Japanese sailor (born 1998)

Personal information
- Nationality: Japanese, New Zealander
- Born: 18 December 1998 (age 26); Atami, Japan

Sailing career
- Class(es): 49er, AC40, F50, Optimist

Leo Takahashi (Japanese: 高橋 稜, Takahashi Ryō, born 18 December 1998) is a Japanese sailor. Takahashi was born in Japan to a New Zealand father and a Japanese mother. He was first introduced to sailing as a young child by his father, a member of the first Japanese America’s Cup Challenger. Leo moved to New Zealand when he was seven, and took up the sport himself at age eight in Murrays Bay, Auckland.

== Career ==
He competed in the 49er event at the 2020 Summer Olympics.

Takahashi represented New Zealand as a co-helm at the 2024 Unicredit Youth America's Cup.

A member of the Japan SailGP Team for Season 1 and 2, and USA SailGP Team in Season 4, Leo Takahashi joined the Black Foils to represent his home country, New Zealand, on a three year contract from Season 5.
