= Groninger Studenten Rugby Club =

- Full name: Groninger Studenten Rugby Club
- Union: Dutch Rugby Union
- Nickname(s): Rugbystuds, Groninger Studenten
- Founded: August 12, 1986; 39 years ago
- Region: Groningen
- Ground(s): Ascot Manor II

The Groninger Student Rugby Club (G.S.R.C.) is a Dutch rugby union club from Groningen.

== History ==
The GSRC was officially founded in 1986 although they were playing as an unofficial team since the late 1970s. The club has been playing her home games at the Ascot Manor II since 1990 which is at the sport park Corpus den Hoorn.

== Teams ==
The club runs two senior sides.

- The first XV currently (season 2024-2025) plays in NRB 2 (North).

Both the first and second XV compete in some NSRB (Dutch Student Rugby Union) tournaments as well.

== Affiliations ==
The GSRC is linked to the University of Groningen. The club is affiliated with GSC Vindicat atque Polit. :)
