= Skadi Rowing Club =

Skadi Rowing Club (Dutch: Algemene Rotterdamse Studenten Roeivereniging "Skadi")
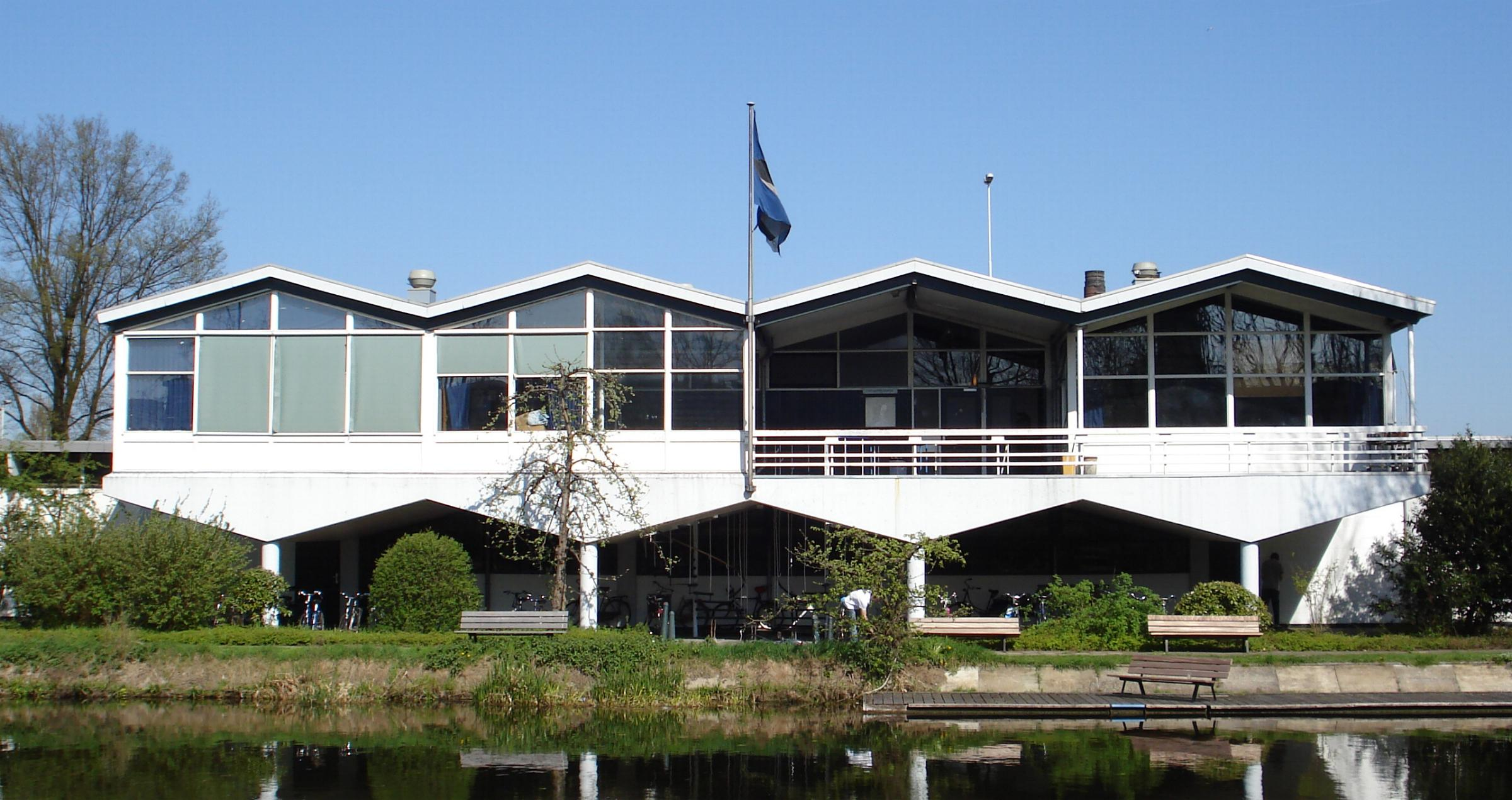

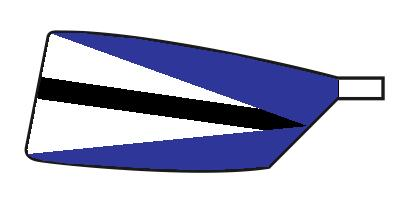
- Location: Noorderkanaalweg 20-22, 3037 AV, Rotterdam, The Netherlands
- Home water: Rotte
- Founded: October 28, 1928
- University: Erasmus University Rotterdam
- Affiliations: Rotterdamsch Studenten Corps, Rotterdamsche Vrouwelijke Studenten Vereeniging
- Website: www.skadi.nl

Events
- The Varsity

A.R.S.R. "Skadi" (Dutch: Algemene Rotterdamse Studenten Roeivereniging "Skadi"), is a Dutch student rowing club located in Rotterdam, The Netherlands.

The name "Skadi" refers to the goddess Skaði from Norse mythology, while A.R.S.R. is the abbreviation for "Algemene Rotterdamse Studenten Roeivereniging" which is Dutch for "Comprehensive Rotterdam Student Rowing Club." Skadi has won The Varsity, the oldest and most prestigious Dutch student rowing event, a total of 9 times.

Skadi is the only rowing club affiliated with Erasmus University Rotterdam. It is situated beside the Noorderkanaal just north of the city centre, which is connected to the river Rotte, where the rowers do most of their training.

== History ==
On 28 October 1928, members of the Rotterdamsch Studenten Corps R.S.C. (student society) established the "Rotterdamsche Studenten Roeivereeniging" (R.S.R.V.) Skadi. Initially sharing a location with Royal "Maas" Yacht Club, they got their own place in 1949. From 1972 non-R.S.C. members could join.

In 1962 Skadi became a member of the "Koninklijke Nederlandsche Studenten Roeibond". While it incorporated the women's society Phecda, part of Rotterdamsche Vrouwelijke Studenten Vereeniging R.V.S.V., (est. 1967) before that in 1976 it also merged with A.R.S.R. & Z.Hades (est. 1961) and became "Algemene Rotterdamse Studenten Roeivereniging" (A.R.S.R.) Skadi. Membership of either R.S.C. or R.V.S.V. was no longer mandatory.

== Facilities ==
The club's facilities include 22 Concept2 ergos, kept in their boathouse. It has 10 eights, 30+ skiffs and more than 100 boats in total. Skadi has its own boatsman, who works full-time.

== Prizes ==
=== National ===
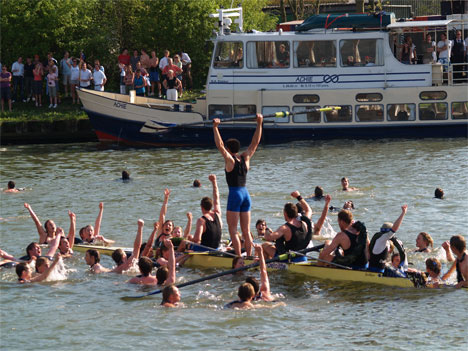
Skadi wins de 124th Varsity.

- 1971 Won "Head of the River Amstel"
- 1981 Won Dutch "Varsity", modelled after the Oxford and Cambridge Boat Race
- 1992 Won Dutch "Varsity"
- 1995 Holland beker.
- 2001 Won Dutch "Varsity"
- 2006 Won Dutch "Varsity"
- 2007 Won Dutch "Varsity"
- 2008 Won Dutch "Varsity"
- 2009 Won Dutch "Varsity"
- 2010 Won Dutch "Varsity"
- 2015 Won Dutch "Varsity"

=== International ===
- 1974 Silver Rowing World Cup
- 1977 Bronze Rowing World Cup, world record on 100 km
- 1978 Silver Rowing World Cup
- 1986 World record women 100 km
- 1989 Gold Rowing World Cup (M4x)
- 1990 Bronze Rowing World Cup (LM4-)
- 1991 Bronze Rowing World Cup (M4x)
- 1996 Gold at Olympic Games (M8+) Koos Maasdijk
- 1997 Bronze Rowing World Cup (LM4x)
- 2008 Bronze Rowing World Championship (LM8+) Pieter Rom Colthoff
- 2009 Bronze Rowing World Cup (M2-) David Kuiper & Mitchel Steenman
- 2012 Gold Rowing European Championship (M2-) Mitchel Steenman
- 2013 Gold Rowing World Championship (LW4x) Maaike Head, Rianne Sigmond
- 2013 Bronze World Rowing Championship (M2-) Mitchel Steenman
- 2014 Gold Rowing World Championship (LW4x) Maaike Head
- 2014 Bronze Rowing European Championship (M2-) Mitchel Steenman
- 2015 Bronze Rowing World Cup I (LW2x) Maaike Head
- 2015 Gold Rowing World Cup II (M2-) Mitchel Steenman
- 2016 Silver Rowing World Cup I (M2-) Mitchel Steenman
- 2016 Gold and Bronze Rowing European Championship (LW2x) Maaike Head, (M2-) Mitchel Steenman
- 2016 Gold Rowing World Championship (LW2x) Maaike Head
- 2016 Silver Rowing World Cup II (M2-) Mitchel Steenman
- 2016 Gold Rowing World Cup III (LW2x) Maaike Head
- 2016 Gold at Olympic Games (LW2x) Maaike Head
- 2017 Silver and Bronze at Rowing European Championship (LW2x) Marieke Keijser, (W4-) Lisanne Brandsma

== See also ==
- G.S.R. Aegir
