= 2017 Red Bull Youth America's Cup =

Youth sailing race competition

2nd Youth Americas Cup
Event information
- Dates: June 12 to June 21, 2017
- Host city: Bermuda
- Boats: Land Rover BAR Academy (United Kingdom); Team Tilt (Switzerland); Team France Jeune; Sail Team NZL (New Zealand); Spanish Impulse by IBEROSTAR (Spain); SVB Team Germany; Swedish Challenge powered by Artemis Youth Racing (Sweden); Team BDA (Bermuda); Youth Vikings Denmark; Kaijin Team Japan; Next Generation USA (United States); Candidate Sailing Team (Austria)

Results
- Winner: Land Rover BAR Academy

Succession
- Previous: 2013
- Next: 2024

The 2017 Red Bull Youth America's Cup was the 2nd Youth Americas Cup and was held in Bermuda from 12 - 21 June. The Youth America's Cup used the America's Cup 45 AC45F class, a one-design foiling wingsail catamaran designed by Oracle Racing. The yachts have 6 crew onboard with teams having one additional substitute (skipper, helm, strategist, main trimmer, jib trimmer and bow). All athletes were aged between 19-24, and teams could choose to include female athletes, although, only Land Rover BAR did so.

== Teams ==
Twelve teams are split into two pools of six for an initial fleet racing series. The 6 clubs that entered the America's Cup challenger series of that year and 6 have been invited to participate. The top four of each division then progress to the final series of 6 fleet races.

=== Group A ===
Team	Yacht Club	Skipper	Crew
(Sweden) Artemis Youth Racing	Kungliga Svenska Segel Sällskapet	Gustav Pettersson	Marcus Anjemark, Julius Hallström, Fritiof Hedstrom, Marcus Höglander, Eddie Klemets Vänersborgs, Axel Munkby, Gustav Pettersson and Rasmus Rosengren
SVB Team Germany		Max Kohlhoff	Moritz Burmester, Frederick Eichhorst, Phillip Kasüske, Johann Kohlhoff, Paul Kohlhoff and Magnus Simon
(Switzerland) Team Tilt	Société Nautique de Genève	Sebastien Schneiter	Jérémy Bachelin, Arthur Cevey, Jocelyn Keller, Guillaume Rigot, Nils Theuninck and Florian Trüb
Team France Jeune		Robin Follin	Jean-Baptiste Ducamin, Sandro Lacan, Timothé Lapauw, Bruno Mourniac, Solune Robert, Antoine Rucard and Valentin Sipan
Youth Vikings Denmark		Daniel Bjørnholt	Mads Emil Stephensen Lübeck, Nicolaj Bjørnholt, Christopher Falholt, Anders Kronborg Kjær, Mathias Bruun Borreskov and Stig Steinfurth
Kaijin Team Japan		Ibuki Koizumi	Hajime Kokumai, Timothy Morishima, Federico Sampei, Leonard Takahashi, Mikiya Tsuji and Shota Usami

=== Group B ===
Team	Yacht Club	Skipper	Crew
(Austria) Candidate Sailing Team		Lukas Höllwerth	Stefan Scharnagl, Maximilian Stelzl, Matthäus Hofer, Emil Huber, Raphael Hussl, Konstantin Kobale, Constantin Marsano, Martin Neidhardt and Helmut Schulz
(United Kingdom) Land Rover BAR Academy	Royal Yacht Squadron	Rob Bunce	Chris Taylor, Annabel Vose, Elliot Hanson, Sam Batten, Neil Hunter and Adam Kay
(Spain) Spanish Impulse by IBEROSTAR		Jordi Xammer	Diego Botin, Luis Bugallo, Florian Trittel, Joan Cardona, Joel Rodriguez, Juan Kevin Cabrera González and Santiago Alegre
(United States) Next Generation USA		Carson Crain	Reed Baldridge, Markus Edegran, Scott Ewing, Preston Farrow, Ian Storck and Matthew Whitehead
(Bermuda) Team BDA		Mackenzie Cooper	Dimitri Stevens, Owen Siese, Mustafa Ingham, Mackenzie Cooper, Peter Dill and Philip Hagen
(New Zealand) Sail Team NZL	Royal New Zealand Yacht Squadron	Logan Dunning Beck	Stewart Dodson, Harry Hull, Isaac McHardie, Matthew Kempkers, Josh Salthouse, Luca Brown, Micah Wilkinson.

== Results ==
Points are awarded to each of the finishing boats with 1st place awarded 10 pts, 2nd awarded 9, 3rd 8, 4th 7, 5th 6 and 6th 5.

=== Qualification Series ===
==== Group A ====
Pos	Team							
Pos	Team	R1	R2	R3	R4	R5	R6	Points
1	(Sweden) Artemis Youth Racing	3	1	1	1	1	4	55
2	SVB Team Germany	2	2	5	2	3	2	47
3	(Switzerland) Team Tilt	4	3	2	2	6	5	46
4	Team France Jeune	1	3	3	4	6	3	46
5	Youth Vikings Denmark	6	4	4	3	4	5	43
6	Kaijin Team Japan	4	6	6	6	5	6	33
Citation:

==== Group B ====
Pos	Team							
Pos	Team	R1	R2	R3	R4	R5	R6	Points
1	(New Zealand) Sail Team NZL	5	1	3	1	4	1	51
2	(United Kingdom) Land Rover BAR Academy	1	4	4	5	2	2	51
3	(Spain) Spanish Impulse by IBEROSTAR	2	2	4	3	1	3	51
4	(Bermuda) Team BDA	4	3	2	2	6	4	45
5	(United States) Next Generation USA	3	5	6	3	5	6	38
6	(Austria) Candidate Sailing Team	6	6	5	6	6	5	32
Citation:

=== Final Series ===
Pos	Team							
Pos	Team	R1	R2	R3	R4	R5	R6	Points
1	(United Kingdom) Land Rover BAR Academy	2	2	1			2	50
2	(New Zealand) Sail Team NZL	7	6	2	1	1	1	48
3	(Switzerland) Team Tilt	5	3	4				42
4	(Sweden) Artemis Youth Racing	6	4	3				37
5	Team France Jeune	4	1	7				35
6	(Spain) Spanish Impulse by IBEROSTAR	3	7	8				34
7	SVB Team Germany	8	5	5				33
8	(Bermuda) Team BDA	1	8	6				33
Citation:
