= 2013 Red Bull Youth America's Cup =

Youth sailing race competition held in 2013

1st Youth Americas Cup
Event information
- Dates: June 12 to June 21, 2013
- Host city: San Francisco, California
- Boats: Team Tilt (Switzerland); Next World Energy (France); Sail Team NZL with Emirates Team New Zealand; Full Metal Jacket Racing; All In Racing (Germany); Swedish Youth Challenge (Sweden); ROFF/Cascais Sailing Team (Portugal); Objective Australia (Australia); American Youth Sailing Force (United States); USA45 Racing (United States)

Results
- Winner: Sail Team NZL with Emirates Team New Zealand

Succession
- Next: 2017

The 2013 Red Bull Youth America's Cup was the inaugural Youth Americas Cup and was held in San Francisco, California from 1–4 September alongside the 34th America's Cup. The Youth America's Cup used the America's Cup 45 AC45F class, a one-design foiling wingsail catamaran designed by Oracle Racing. The yachts have 6 crew on board with teams having one additional substitute (skipper, helm, strategist, main trimmer, jib trimmer and bow). All athletes were aged between 19 and 24 years old.

== Teams ==
Five teams were selected as they were sponsored by the teams competing in the America's Cup World Series and the other five were selected from other nations worldwide.

10 teams entered into a total of 8 fleet races, although the eighth race was cancelled due to wind speed exceeding the 18-knot limit.

Team	Yacht Club	Skipper	Crew
(Sweden) Swedish Youth Challenge	Kungliga Svenska Segel Sällskapet	Charlie Ekberg	Charlie Ekberg, Niclas Düring, Nils Åkervall, Andreas Axelsson, Jonathan Ameln, Tom Gross
(Germany) All In Racing		Phillipp Buhl or Erik Heil	Max Kohlhoff
(Switzerland) Team Tilt	Société Nautique de Genève	Lucien Cujean	
(France) Next World Energy	Yacht Club de France	Arthur Ponroy	Antoine Lauriot-Prevost
Objective Australia	Royal Prince Alfred Yacht Club	Jason Waterhouse	
(Portugal) ROFF/Cascais Sailing Team	Naval Club of Cascais	Barnardo Freitas	
Sail Team NZL with Emirates Team New Zealand	Yachting New Zealand	Peter Burling (sailor)	Blair Tuke, Jono Spurdle, Guy Endean, Andy Maloney, Sam Meech and Jason Saunders
(New Zealand) Full Metal Jacket Racing	Royal New Zealand Yacht Squadron	Will Tiller	
(United States) American Youth Sailing Force	Richmond Yacht Club	Mike Menninger or Ian Andrewes	Mikey Radziejowski
(United States) USA45 Racing	San Diego Yacht Club	Charlie Buckingham	

== Results ==
Points are awarded to each of the finishing boats with 1st place awarded 10 pts, 2nd awarded 9, 3rd 8, 4th 7, 5th 6 and 6th 5.

Pos	Team									
Pos	Team	R1	R2	R3	R4	R5	R6	R7	R8	Points
1	Sail Team NZL with Emirates Team New Zealand	2	RDG^{*}	7	3	1	1	4	-	57
2	(New Zealand) Full Metal Jacket Racing	7	1	4	6	6	3	5	-	45
3	(Portugal) ROFF/Cascais Sailing Team	3	6	1	8	8	5	2	-	44
4	(Switzerland) Team Tilt	8	5	2	2	9	7	1	-	43
5	(United States) American Youth Sailing Force	1	7	3	5	7	4	8	-	42
6	(Sweden) Swedish Youth Challenge	6	2	9	1	4	6	10	-	39
7	Object Australia	RDG	10	6	10	2	3	DNS^{**}	-	38
8	(France) Next World Energy	4	4	8	4	5	9	6	-	37
9	(Germany) All in Racing	5	8	5	9	3	8	9	-	30
10	(United States) USA45 Racing	9	9	10	7	10	10	7	-	15
Citation:

^{*} RDG - Redress awarded by international jury
^{**} DNS - Did Not Start (team awarded no points)
