= Artemis Technologies =

British maritime technology company

- Industry: Maritime technology
- Founded: January 2017
- Founder: Iain Percy
- Headquarters: Belfast, Northern Ireland
- Products: Artemis eFoiler® propulsion system, electric hydrofoiling vessels
- Website: www.artemistechnologies.co.uk

Artemis Technologies is a maritime technology company that evolved from the successful Artemis Racing team, which competed in the America's Cup. The company is named after the ancient Greek goddess Artemis. Artemis Technologies focuses on the development of zero-emission maritime transport solutions, most notably the Artemis eFoiler, the world's first commercially viable, zero emission propulsion solution for high speed maritime transport.

== History ==
Iain Percy, an Olympic sailor and former Artemis Racing skipper, is the CEO of Artemis Technologies. In 2020, Artemis Technologies led the formation of the Belfast Maritime Consortium, a group of 13 partners that successfully secured £33 million from the UK Research and Innovation's Strength in Places Fund. This funding aims to develop zero-emission ferries in Belfast, with the total project investment expected to reach £60 million.

Artemis Technologies will launch the Artemis EF-24 Passenger - a zero-emission electric hydrofoiling passenger ferry. The first of which will operate a technology demonstration route between Belfast and Bangor. The Artemis EF-24 Passenger vessel can carry up to 150 passengers and reduce fuel costs by 85% compared to traditional diesel-powered ferries.
