= Nes aan de Amstel =

- Village
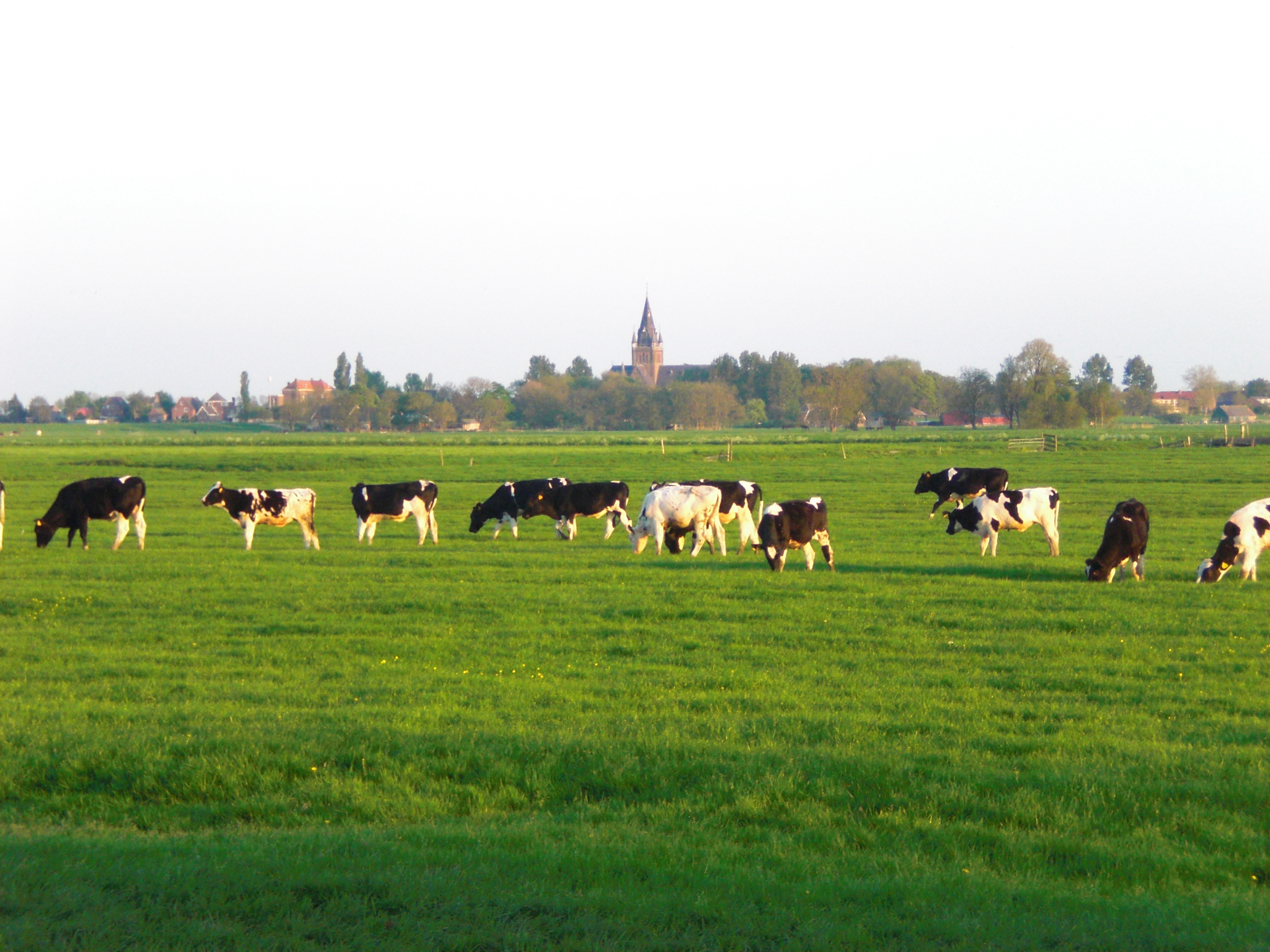
- View of Nes aan de Amstel

- Location in the Netherlands Location in the province of North Holland in the Netherlands
- Coordinates: 52°15′33″N 4°52′15″E
- Country: Netherlands
- Province: North Holland
- Municipality: Amstelveen

Area
  - Total: 10.39 km^{2} (4.01 sq mi)
- Elevation: −0.8 m (−2.6 ft)

Population (2021)
  - Total: 985
  - Density: 94.8/km^{2} (246/sq mi)
- Time zone: UTC+1 (CET)
  - Summer (DST): UTC+2 (CEST)
- Postal code: 1189
- Dialing code: 020
- Website: nesaandeamstel.nl

Nes aan de Amstel (Dutch pronunciation: [ˈnɛs aːn də ˈʔɑmstəl]) is a village in the municipality of Amstelveen in the province of North Holland, Netherlands. The village's name indicates that it is located on the Amstel; it is situated on the edge of the Ronde Hoep polder.

== History ==
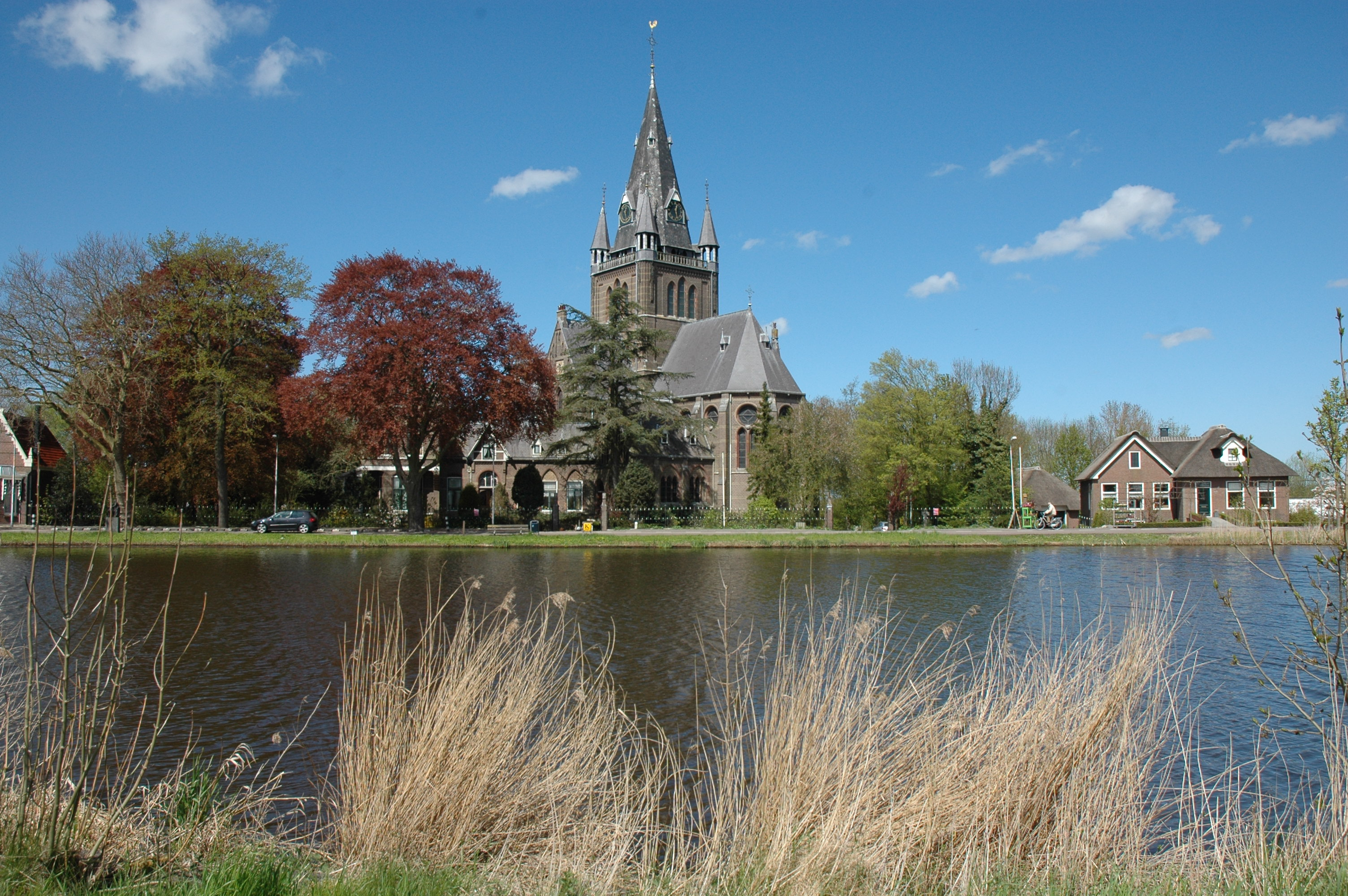
Sint-Urbanuskerk

The village was established in the 16th century and has gradually been developing since 1947. The landscape is largely determined by the town's Catholic church, the Sint-Urbanuskerk, built to a design by the architect Joseph Cuypers.

== Events ==
Nes aan de Amstel is known for hosting the Dorpsfeest. Each year in the summer during the town festival, the slob en sloot race is organised, during which approximately 50 participants submit an itinerary through the fields and ditches around the town.

== Notable people ==
Notable people from Nes aan de Amstel include:

- Agatha Deken (1741–1804), writer and poet
