= Hannah Mills =

British sailor

Hannah Mills OBE
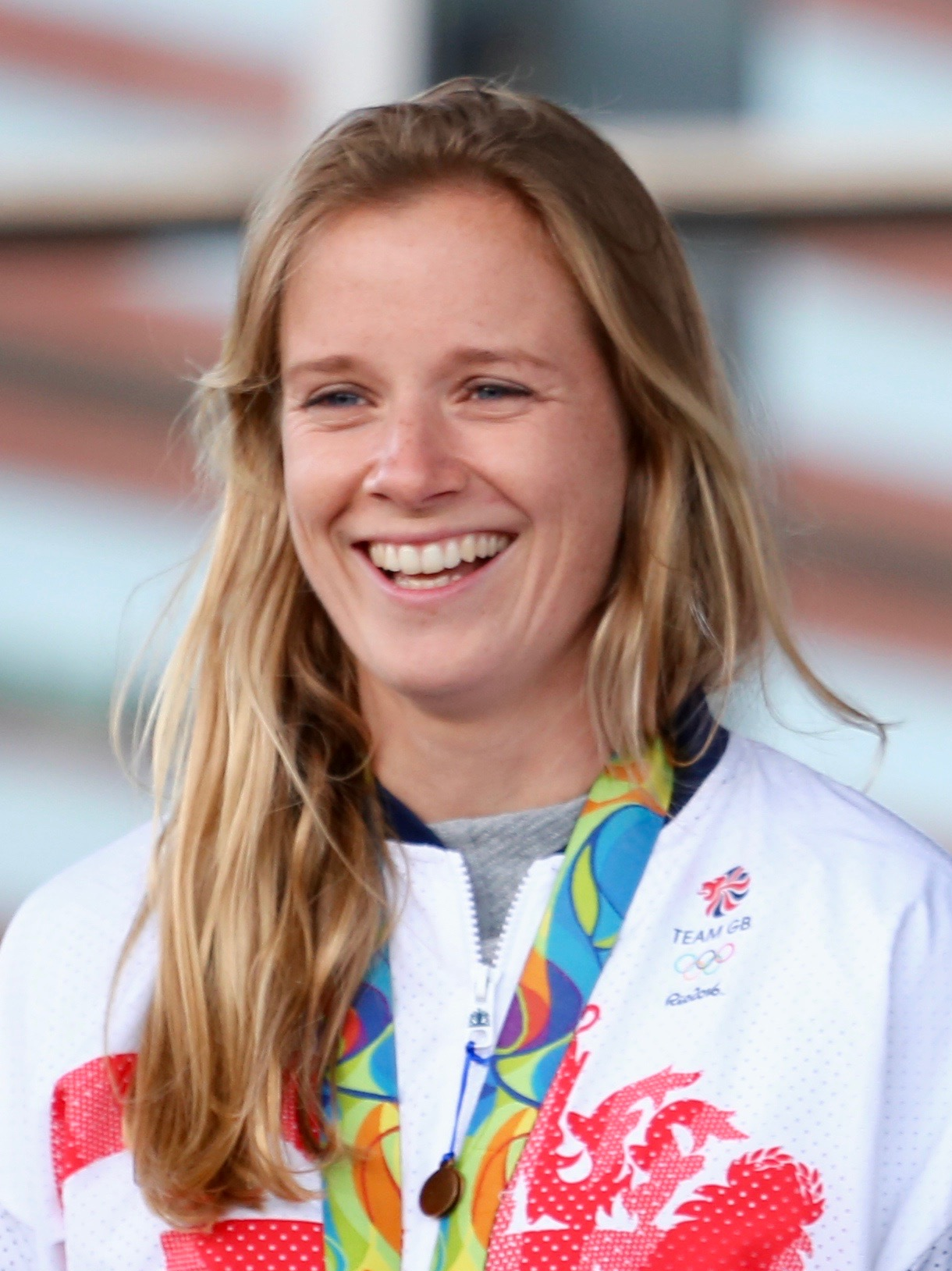
- Mills in 2016

Personal information
- Full name: Hannah Louise Mills
- Born: 29 February 1988 (age 38) Cardiff, South Glamorgan, Wales
- Height: 157 cm (5 ft 2 in)
- Weight: 50 kg (110 lb)

Sailing career
- Sport: Sailing
- Classes: Optimist; 420; 470
Medal record
Sailing
Representing Great Britain
Olympic Games
Gold medal – first place	2020 Tokyo	Women's 470
Gold medal – first place	2016 Rio de Janeiro	Women's 470
Silver medal – second place	2012 London	Women's 470
World Championships
Gold medal – first place	2006 Las Palmas	Women's 420
Gold medal – first place	2012 Barcelona	Women's 470
Gold medal – first place	2019 Enoshina	Women's 470
Silver medal – second place	2011 Perth	Women's 470
Silver medal – second place	2015 Haifa	Women's 470
Silver medal – second place	2017 Thessaloniki	Women's 470
Bronze medal – third place	2014 Santander	Women's 470
Bronze medal – third place	2018 Aarhus	Women's 470
Junior World Championships
Gold medal – first place	2008 Gdynia	Women's 470
European Championships
Silver medal – second place	2014 Athens	Women's 470
Silver medal – second place	2019 Sanremo	Women's 470
Silver medal – second place	2021 Vilamoura	Women's 470
European Junior Championships
Gold medal – first place	2007 Netherlands	Women's 470
Silver medal – second place	2008 Croatia	Women's 470

Hannah Louise Mills (born 29 February 1988) is a British competitive sailor and two-time world champion in the 470 class, having won in 2012 and 2019. Mills won a silver medal for Team GB with her crew Saskia Clark in the 2012 Olympics, she followed this up with a gold in the same event at both the 2016 Olympics in Rio de Janeiro and, partnered by Eilidh McIntyre, the 2020 Olympics in Tokyo.

Mills has been the on-board strategist for the Emirates Great Britain SailGP Team since 2021. In 2022, Mills and Ben Ainslie launched Athena Pathway, a programme to help fast-track development for female and youth sailors. The Athena Pathway team competed in the first ever Women's America's Cup, helmed by Mills.

== Early life ==
Mills was born in Cardiff, Wales, and started sailing at Cardiff Sailing Centre (then Llanishen Sailing Centre) when she was 8 years old after trying sailing on a family holiday in Cornwall. Mills then started moving up to sail for the Welsh National Optimist Squad and winning the British Optimist Championships in 2001. She represented GBR at the 2002 and 2003 Optimist World Championship finishing first girl and fifth over-all in 2003, the best ever result by a British sailor at that championship.

Mills attended Howell's School, Llandaff in her teen years, with her now retired relative being a teacher there. She is part of the schools pay only alumnus programme, sometimes visiting the school to talk about her achievements.

== Career ==
=== 470 dinghy ===
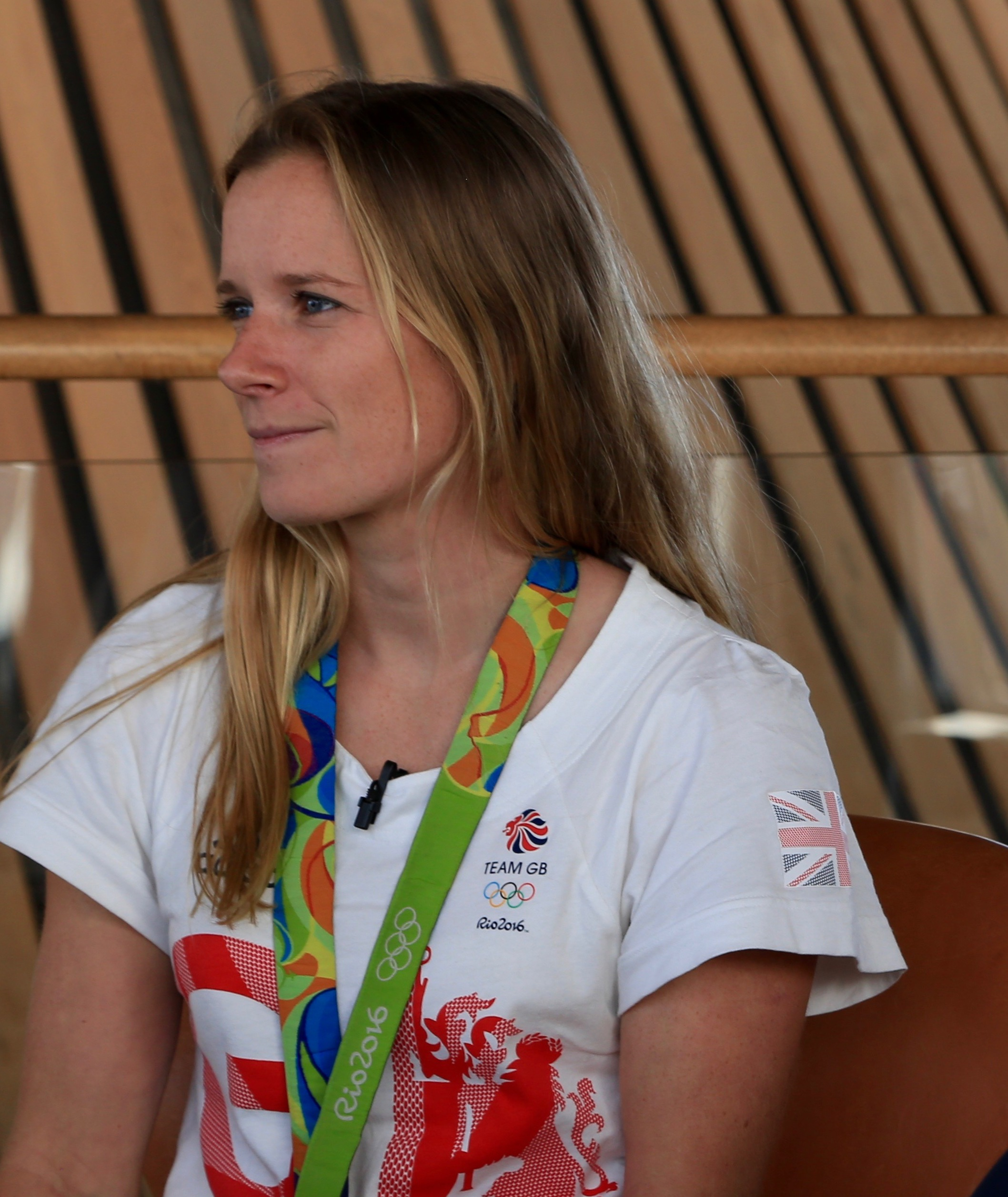
Mills at Senedd Cymru – Welsh Parliament; 2016

At the 2011 Skandia Sail for Gold regatta and the 2011 Weymouth & Portland International Regatta, Mills and her crew Saskia Clark won a silver medal in the women's 470 event. At the 2012 470 World Championships in Barcelona, Mills and Clark claimed gold despite having suffered a black flag disqualification in the very first race of the championships.

On 10 August 2012, Mills helming for Clark won a silver medal at the Olympic games in Weymouth. Mills battled hard throughout the event, not finishing outside the top six the entire regatta. They went into the medal race equal points with the New Zealand team and far enough ahead of the rest of the fleet that both boats were battling it out for gold and silver. After a great start, however, there was a dramatic wind shift and they came ninth in the medal race, which gave them the silver medal.

Mills and Clark continued towards the 2016 Olympics in Rio de Janeiro. On 10 December 2014, they were robbed at knifepoint in Rio de Janeiro while in training for the event.

Mills and Clark won gold at the 2016 Olympics in Rio de Janeiro.

In October 2019, Mills was named as one among twelve sailors by British Olympic Association for Tokyo 2020.

She was selected as one of the British flag bearers at the 2020 Olympics in Japan, which took place in July 2021. On 4 August 2021, Mills and Eilidh McIntyre won a gold medal in the women's 470 event. On 2 December 2021, Mills won the World Sailor of the Year Awards alongside McIntyre.

=== SailGP and Athena Pathway ===
Mills joined the Emirates Great Britain SailGP Team in 2021, starting in the Cádiz event of the 2021–22 SailGP season.

In 2022, Mills and Ben Ainslie launched Athena Pathway, a programme to help fast-track development for female and youth sailors. Athena Pathway has a team competing in the first-ever Women's America's Cup, skippered by Mills also including Tasha Bryant, Saskia Clark, Hannah Diamond, Anna Burnet, Ellie Aldridge and Hattie Rogers. The team made it through the heats and their boat Athena Pathway was beaten in the finals in October 2024 by the Italian team.

Athena Pathway also put together a British Youth Team to defend their title from the inaugural event in Bermuda in 2017. Athena Pathway entered a team into both the 2nd Unicredit Youth America's Cup and the inaugural Puig Women's America's Cup. The women's team was skippered by Mills.

== Awards and honours ==
In 2002, Mills was voted UK Young Sailor of the Year and BBC Wales Young Sports Personality of the Year. Mills won the Female World Sailor of the Year award in 2016.

Milles was awarded an Honorary Master of Science degree in 2013 and an Honorary Doctorate in 2017 from the University of Chichester.

Mills was appointed Member of the Order of the British Empire (MBE) in the 2017 New Year Honours and Officer of the Order of the British Empire (OBE) in the 2022 New Year Honours for services to sailing and the environment.

== Personal life ==
Mills is married to windsurfer Nick Dempsey with whom she has a daughter.

Olympic Games
Preceded by Andy Murray	Opening ceremony flagbearer for Great Britain (with Moe Sbihi); Tokyo 2020	Succeeded by Tom Daley and Helen Glover
