= Artemis eFoiler =

Hydrofoil being developed in N. Ireland

The Artemis eFoiler is a range of zero-emissions hydrofoil boats currently being developed in Belfast, Northern Ireland, by Artemis Technologies. The 24-metre passenger variant will be used by Condor Ferries on a route between Belfast and Bangor from 2024. The hydrofoil enables it to have low water resistance and therefore minimal wake.

The 11-metre long boat will carry up to 24 passengers and has a cruising speed of 25 knots and a range of 60 nautical miles. A Belfast Maritime Consortium led by Artemis Technologies won a £33m grant from the UK government to develop the boat. The boat began sea trials in April 2022 on Belfast Lough.

In October 2020, British MP Nus Ghani was announced as a non-executive director of Artemis.

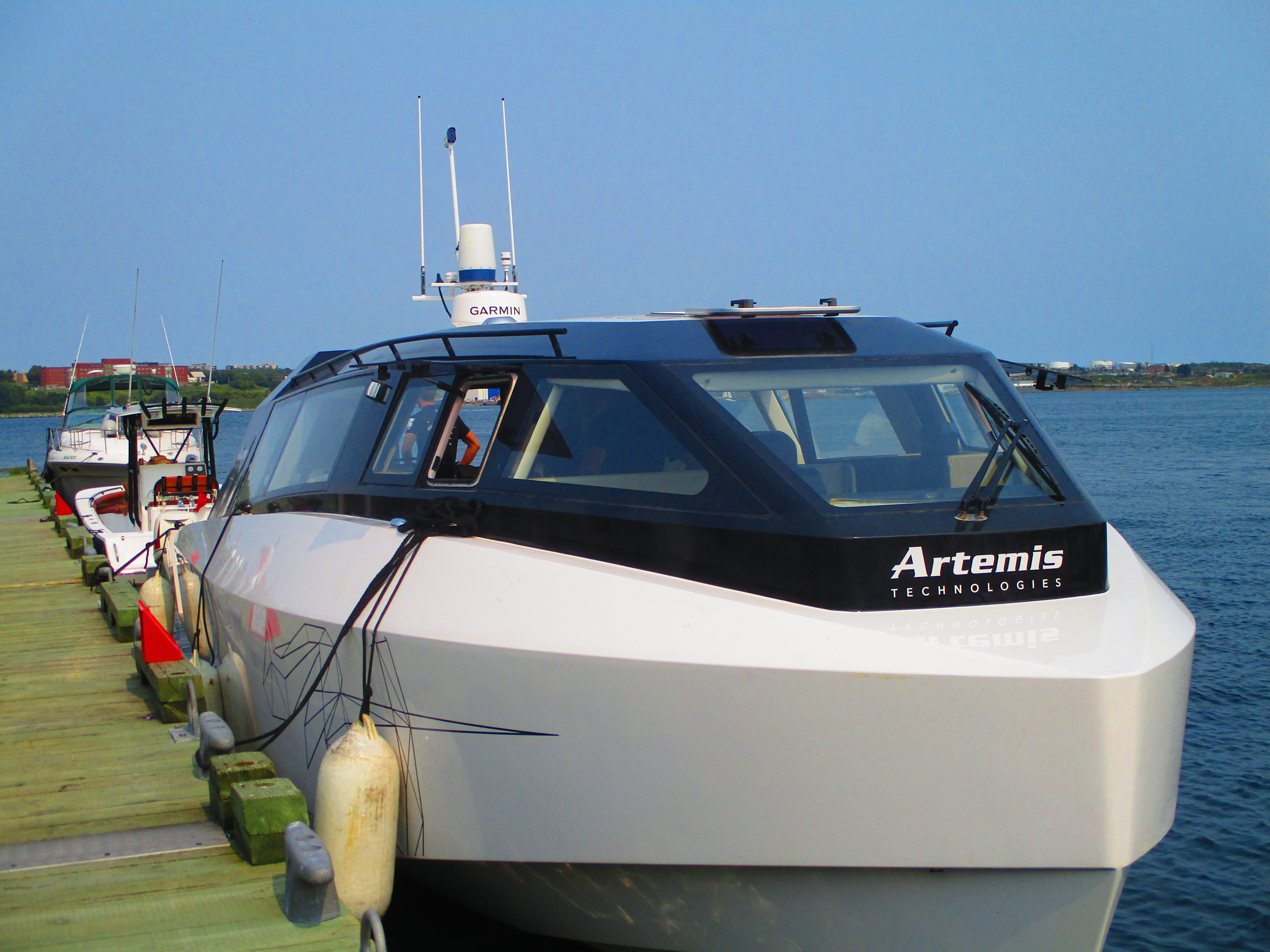
Artemis EF 12 Escape docked in Halifax Harbour, 4 August 2025
