= Royal Dutch Rowing Federation =

- Sport: Rowing
- Jurisdiction: Netherlands
- Abbreviation: (KNRB)
- Founded: 1917
- Affiliation: FISA
- Headquarters: Bosbaan, Amstelveen
- President: Seada van den Herik

Official website
- knrb.nl

The Royal Dutch Rowing Federation (Dutch: Koninklijke Nederlandse Roeibond, a.k.a. KNRB) is the federation of all Dutch rowing clubs. It was founded in 1917.

The federation is a member of NOC*NSF and can nominate candidates and teams to participate in the Olympic Games.

The Federation's headquarters are located at the Bosbaan in Amstelveen. The current president, as of 2022, is Seada van den Herik.
