= Head of the River Amstel =

Annual rowing race in Amsterdam area (Netherlands)

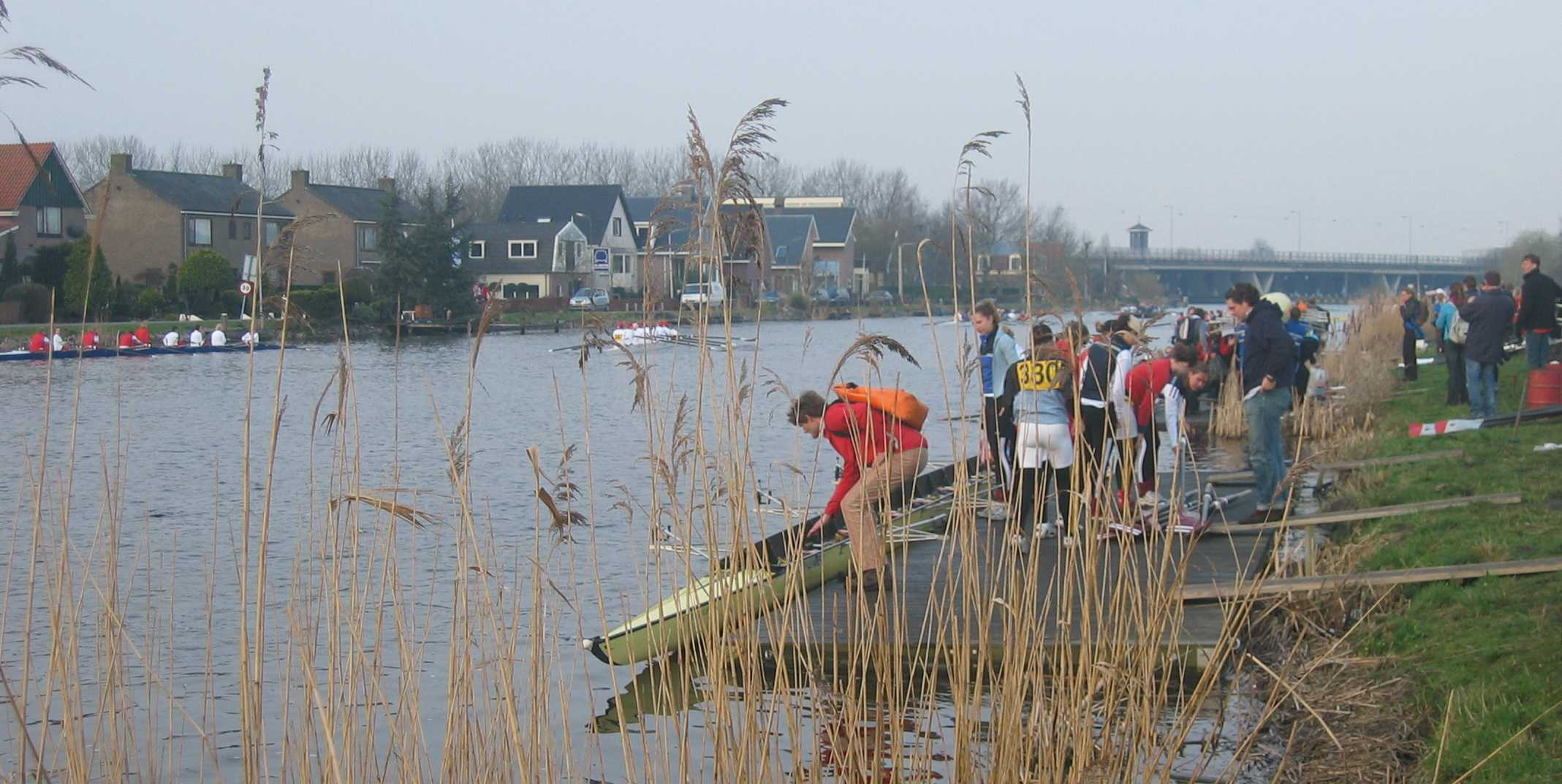
- The Amstel during the race.
- Frequency: Annual
- Locations: Amsterdam and Ouderkerk aan de Amstel, Netherlands
- Years active: 1933–present
- Previous event: 7-8 March 2026
- Next event: 6-7 March 2027
- Organiser: Willem III rowing club, Amsterdam Rowing Association
- Website: headoftheriver.nl

The Head of the River Amstel is a rowing race held annually on the river Amstel in Amsterdam, Netherlands on the 8 km track from Amsterdam to Ouderkerk aan de Amstel. The Willem III Rowing Club organises the race in association with the Amsterdam Rowing Association.

== History ==
The Head of the River Race provided the inspiration for the Head of the River Amstel. The race was held for the first time in 1933 when the Women's Longdistance Championship of the Amstel, organised by Willem III and the Men's Longdistance Championship of the Amstel, organised by the ARB, merged. Since then the race grew to one of the biggest rowing events in the Netherlands with more than 500 boats and 4000 participants. For the first 75 years of its existence, the boats started in Ouderkerk and finished in the centre of Amsterdam. From 2007 to 2018 this was turned around and the regatta started in Amsterdam and finished in Ouderkerk. After much effort the organizing committee succeeded in changing route to again finish in Amsterdam. The start would take place from Ouderkerk aan de Amstel to Amsterdam again. Unfortunately the race had to be canceled in 2018, the frost did not allow the race to be rowed. However, the route has started from Ouderkerk for all subsequent editions of the Head of the River Amstel.

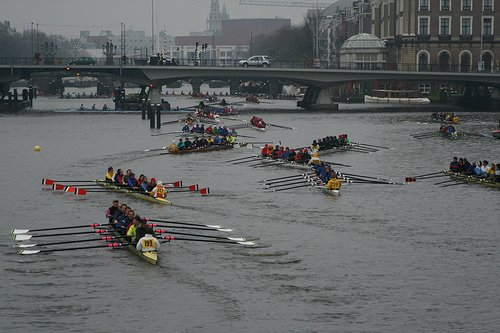
Eights lining up for the start of Head of the River 2008. In the background the Amstel Hotel.

== See also ==
- Varsity (rowing regatta)
