= Amstel =

River in North Holland, the Netherlands

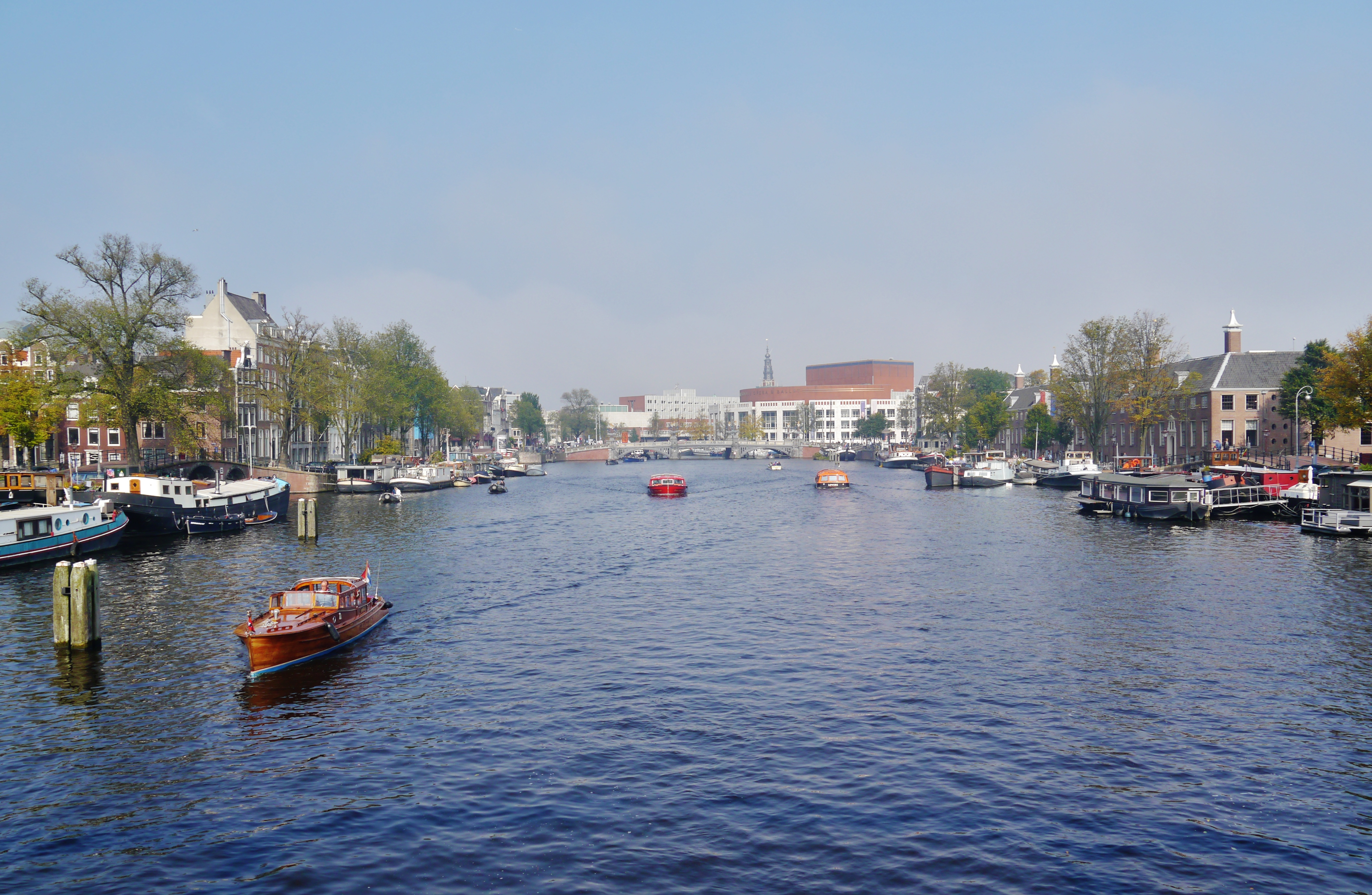
- The Amstel in city center of Amsterdam with the Stopera (center) and H'ART Museum (right)

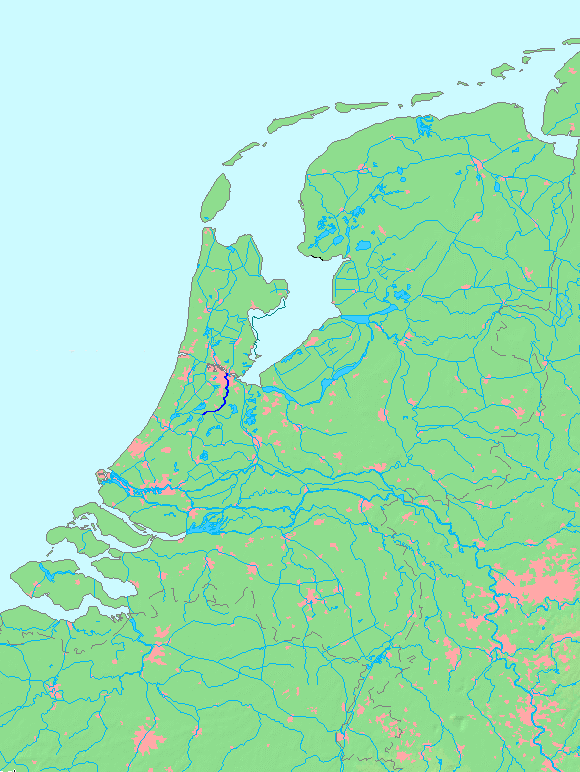
- Location of the Amstel in dark blue

Location
- Country: Netherlands
- Province: North Holland, South Holland, Utrecht
- Water board: Amstel, Gooi en Vecht
- Municipalities: Nieuwkoop, Uithoorn, De Ronde Venen, Amstelveen, Ouder-Amstel, Amsterdam

Physical characteristics
- Source: Aarkanaal / Drecht
  - location: Nieuwveen, South Holland
  - coordinates: 52°12′24″N 4°44′05″E
- Mouth: IJ
  - location: Amsterdam, North Holland
  - coordinates: 52°22′08″N 4°53′33″E
- Length: 31 km (19 mi)

The Amstel (Dutch: [ˈɑmstəl]) is a river in the province of North Holland in the Netherlands. It flows from the Aarkanaal and Drecht in Nieuwveen northwards, passing Uithoorn, Amstelveen, and Ouderkerk aan de Amstel, to the IJ in Amsterdam, to which the river gives its name. Annually, the river is the location of the Liberation Day concert, Head of the River Amstel rowing match, and the Amsterdam Gay Pride boat parade.

== Etymology ==
"Giselberto de Amestelle" (Gijsbrecht of Amstel) on a document from 1189

The name Amstel and the older form Aemstel are derived from Amestelle, which is a compound of the words aam or ame meaning water and stelle meaning solid, high, and dry ground. In the 12th century, Amestelle was used for the area or gouw that was closed in by the rivers Amstel and Bullewijk and the bay IJ. Between the 12th and 14th centuries, the area was developed and ruled by the Van Amstel family. The river Amstel was named after this land area.

Between 1525 and 1990, the water board or hoogheemraadschap of the area through which the river flows was Amstelland (Amstel Land), a name still in use for the region. The names of the settlements Amstelhoek (Amstel Bend), Amsterdam (Amstel Dam), Nes aan de Amstel (Headland upon Amstel), and Ouderkerk aan de Amstel (Old Church upon Amstel) on the banks of the Amstel were derived from the river's name.

== History ==
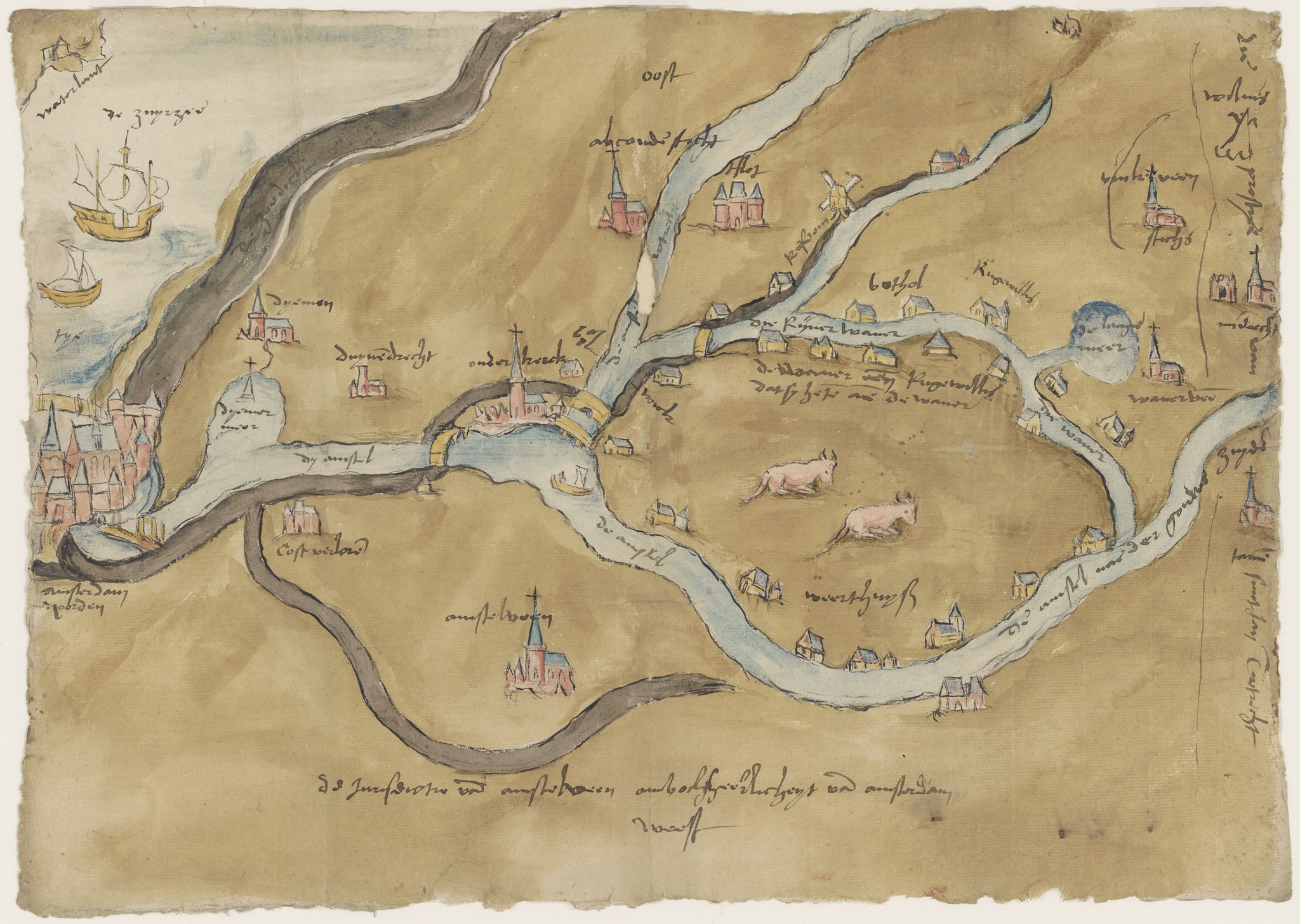
Map of the river Amstel from c. 1575

The Amstel was formed around 1050 BC when a freshwater river cut into a tidal channel of the IJ which are now Damrak and Rokin.

== Course ==
=== Sources ===
The Amstel begins where the canal Aarkanaal and the river Drecht meet, just north of the village Nieuwveen in the province of South Holland. Here the river forms the border between the provinces of South Holland and North Holland and flows in northeastern direction.

=== Amstelland ===
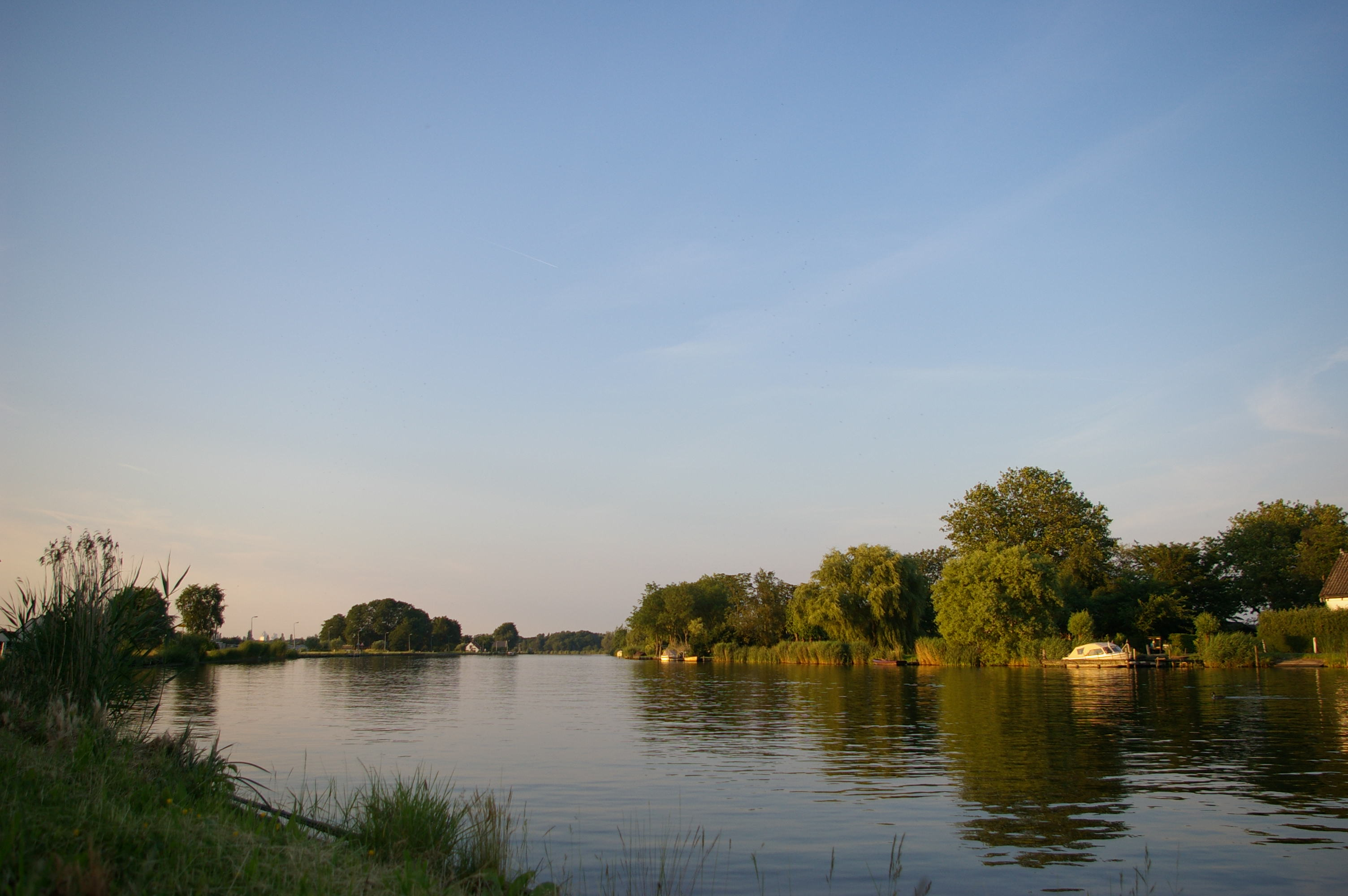
Amstel near Nes aan de Amstel, between Uithoorn and Amstelveen

The Amstel passes the hamlet Vrouwenakker and is then joined by the tributary river Kromme Mijdrecht. On the northern bank is the town Uithoorn and on the southern bank is the village Amstelhoek. Here the river forms the border between the provinces of Utrecht and North Holland.

Further on, the river is joined by the tributary river Oude Waver. From here onwards, the river flows northward through the province of North Holland. The Amstel passes the village Nes aan de Amstel.

On the western bank is the town Amstelveen, where there is a small island in the river named Amsteleiland, and on the eastern bank the town of Ouderkerk aan de Amstel, where the river is joined by the tributary river Bullewijk. After this the Amstel flows into the city of Amsterdam.

=== Amsterdam ===
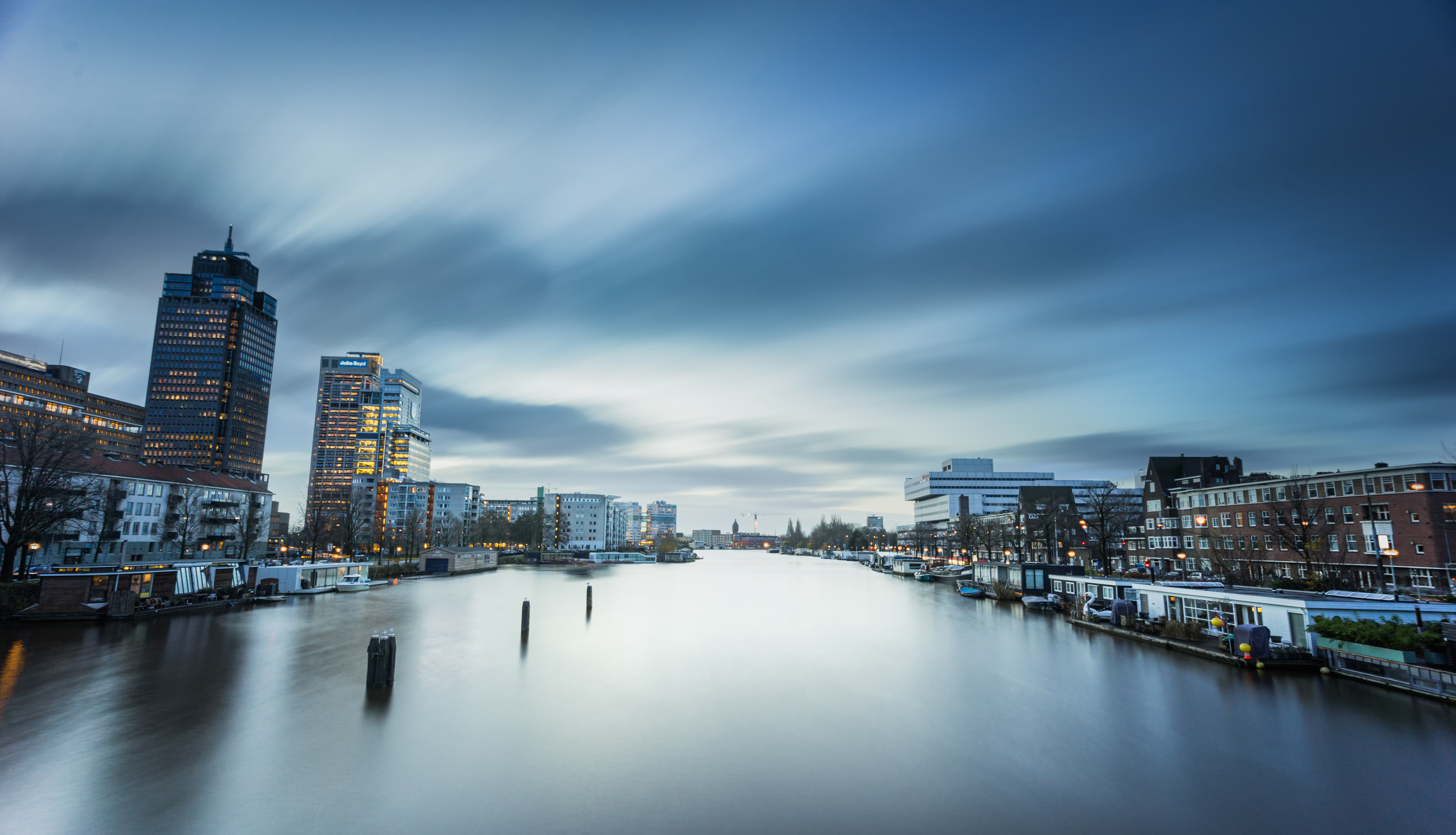
Amstel near the Rembrandt Tower in Amsterdam

In Amsterdam, the canals Duivendrechtsevaart and Weespertrekvaart are tributaries to the Amstel. There are several historical bridges crossing the river, among which are the Berlagebrug, Magere Brug, and Blauwbrug.

In the city center, the river is connected to several city canals, which are a UNESCO World Heritage Site. The Amstel Hotel, Royal Theater Carré, H'ART Museum, city hall in the Stopera, and Allard Pierson Museum are located on the eastern bank of the river.

The river continues via the Rokin to the Langebrugsteeg before being routed underground through pipes, passing under the filled in part of the Rokin and Dam Square before remerging into the Damrak at the Oudebrugsteeg. The river then passes beneath the Prins Hendrikkade before empyting into the Open Havenfront.

=== Mouth ===
The original course continues with Damrak, after which it passes Stationseiland, an artificial island with Amsterdam Centraal station, and flows into the former bay IJ.

== Cultural events ==
A nationally televised concert is held on the river every year on Liberation Day. The rowing races Head of the River Amstel and Heineken Roeivierkamp are held on the river annually. The river also forms part of the route of the Canal Parade, Amsterdam's annual floating gay pride parade.

== Artist impressions ==
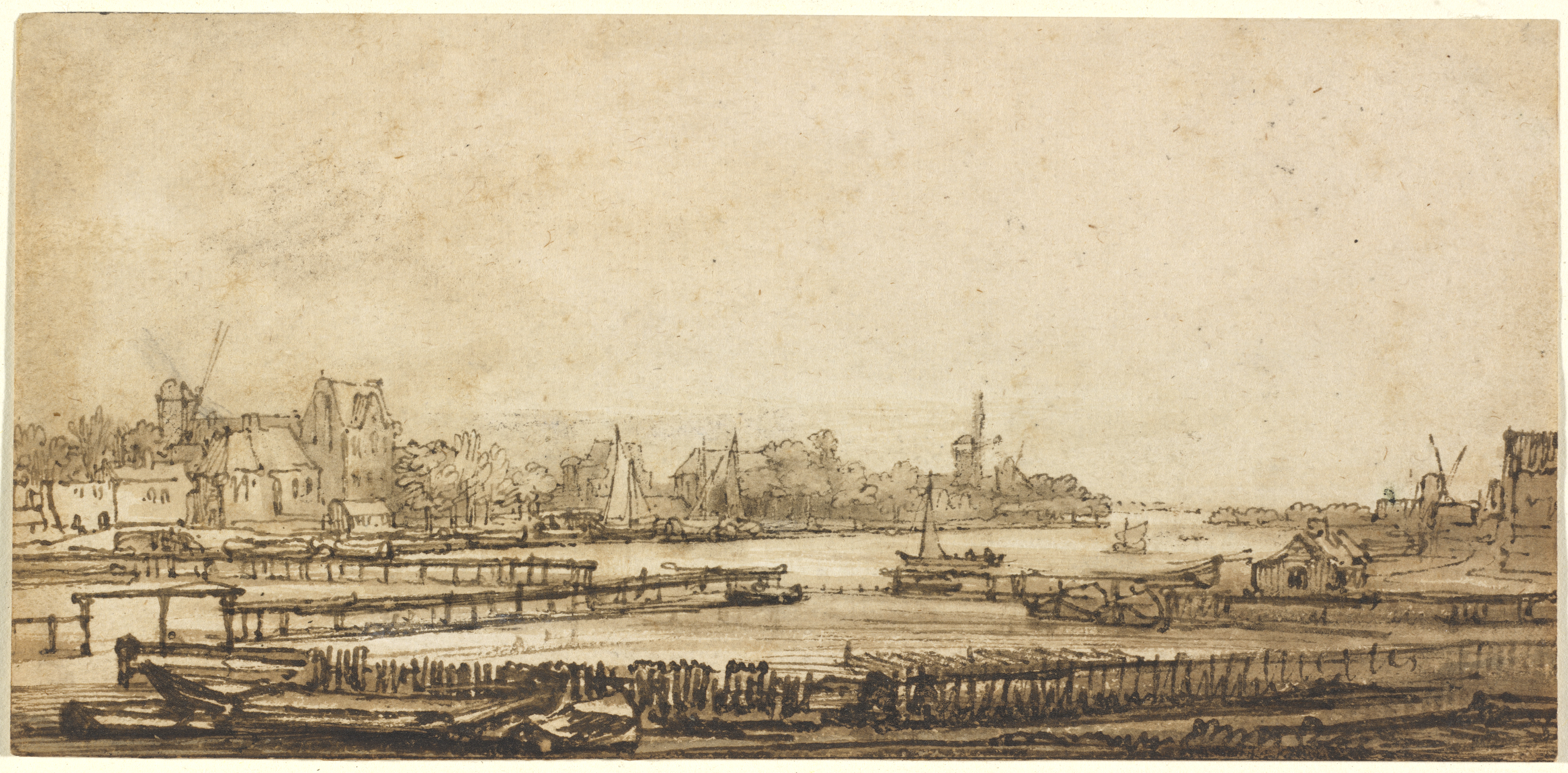
17th-century drawing of the river Amstel by Rembrandt

The river has been depicted by many artists, including:

- Aert van der Neer (1603–1677)
- Rembrandt (1609–1669)
- Willem Witsen (1860–1923)
- George Hendrik Breitner (1857–1923)
- Piet Mondrian (1872–1944)
