= Artemis Racing =

Professional sailing team

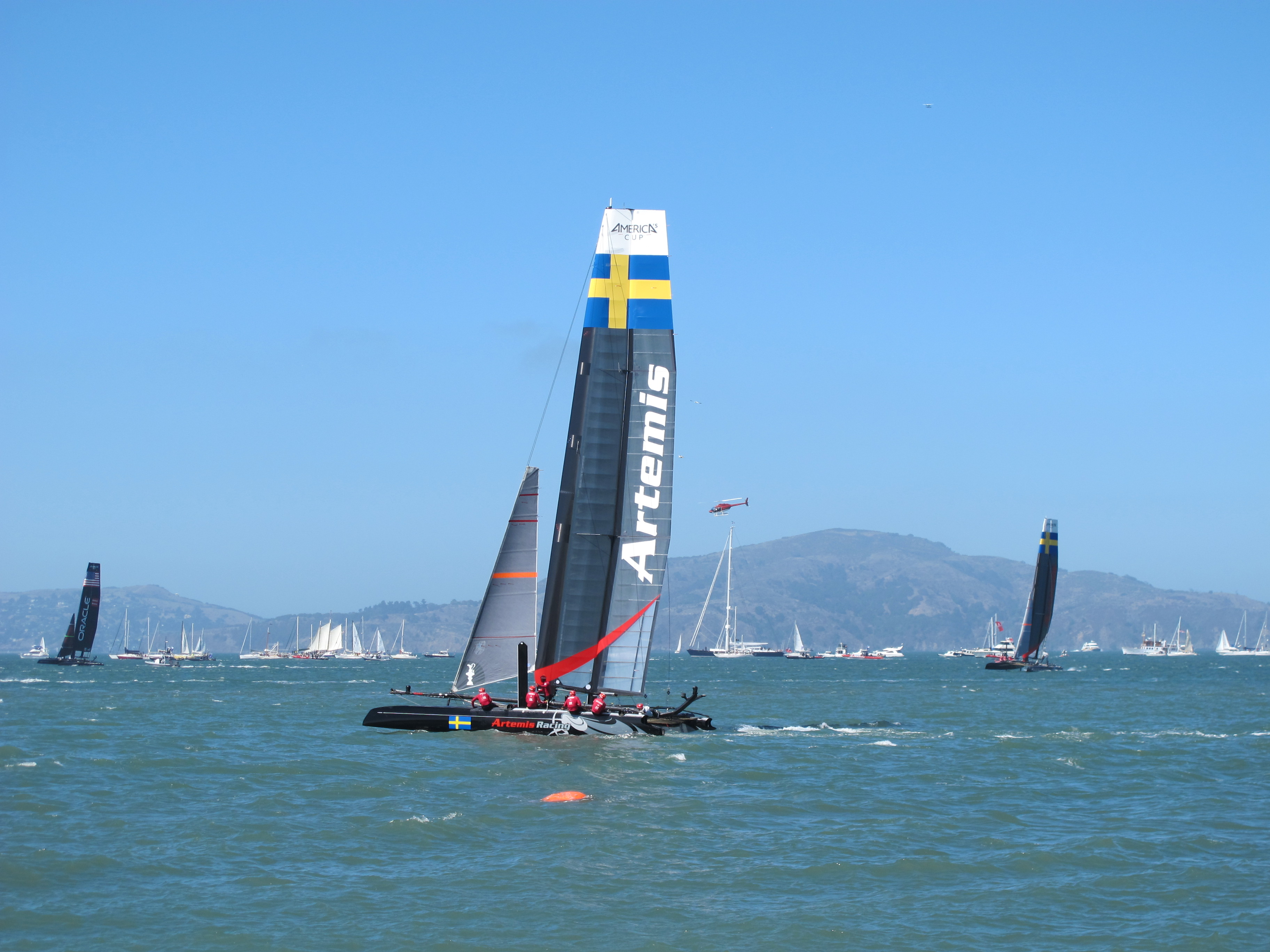
- During the America's Cup World Series, San Francisco Round (2012).

Career
- Yacht club: Royal Swedish Yacht Club
- Established: 2006
- Nation: Sweden
- Notable sailors: Iain Percy; Nathan Outteridge; Loïck Peyron; Paul Goodison; Fredrik Lööf; Iain Jensen; Chris Brittle

Yachts
- Sail no.: Boat name

Artemis Racing is a professional sailing team founded in 2006 by businessman and sailor Torbjörn Törnqvist, named after Artemis, the ancient Greek goddess.

== Timeline ==
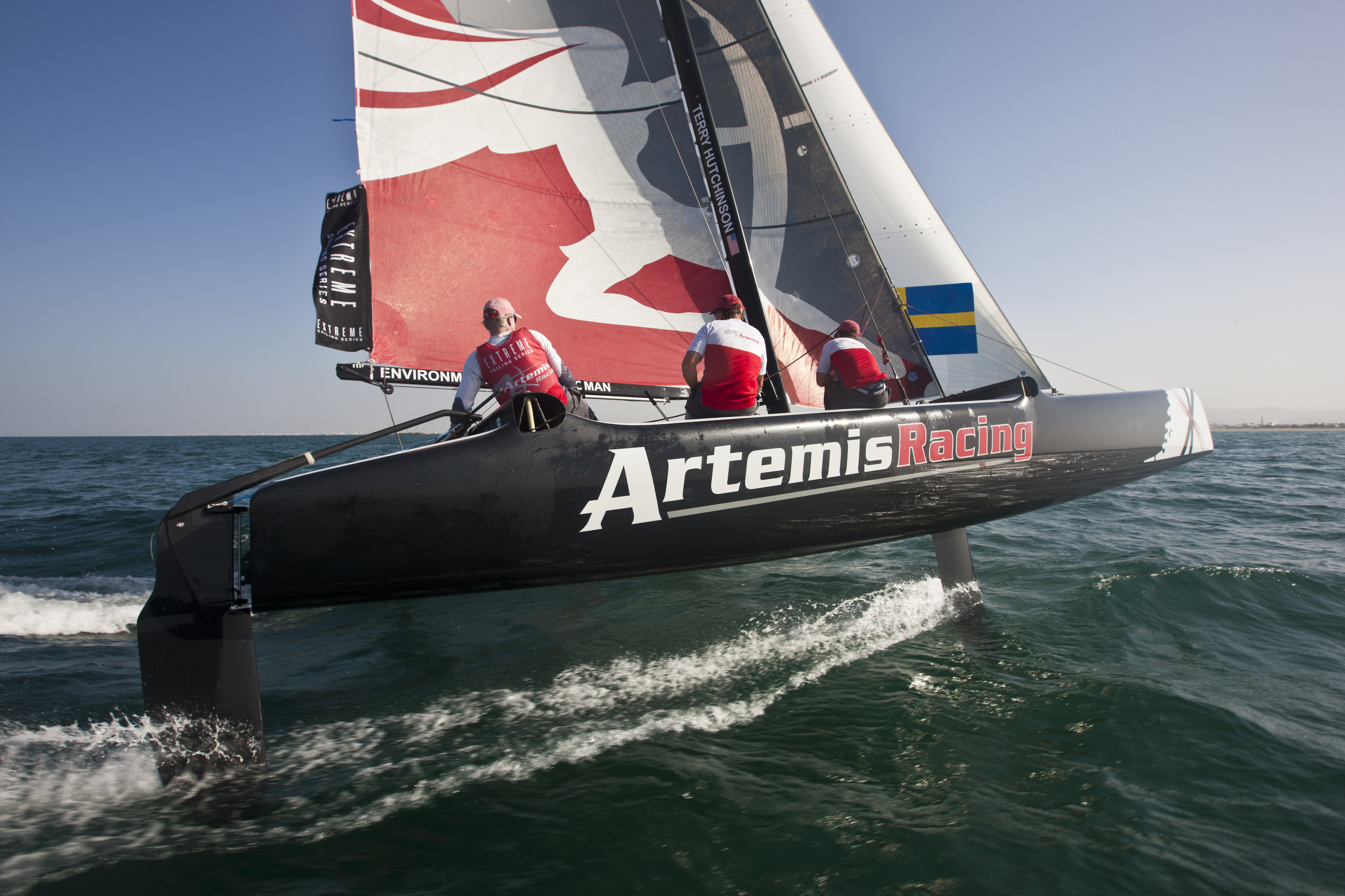
Artemis Oman

- 2007: won the MedCup circuit, then called Breitling Medcup, and the TP52 World Championship.
- 2008: entered the RC44 Championship, winning the fleet racing element in 2009 and the World title in 2011.
- 2009–2010: competed in the Louis Vuitton Trophy regattas. Held in response to long delays from legal action surrounding the America's Cup, the four regattas were each staged in a different country, and teams raced in supplied IACC yachts.
- 2011–2012 America's Cup World Series: won the Match Racing title in both the Naples & Venice Regattas then won the Match Racing titles in the first two regattas of the three-part 2012–2013 season.
- 2013: On May 9, the first of the two AC72 catamarans the team was testing capsized and turtled, resulting in the death of crewmember and British Olympic gold medalist sailor Andrew "Bart" Simpson. This was the second major accident involving the current AC72, following the capsizing of defending Cup champion Oracle Team USA on October 16, 2012.
- 2017: In August 2014, Artemis Racing announced its challenge for the 35th America's Cup which is scheduled to be raced in Bermuda in June 2017. The team designed and built their boats for the 35th America's Cup challenge, from a converted aircraft hangar in Alameda, California. In the challenger series, Artemis progressed to the Louis Vuitton Cup finals, where they were defeated by Emirates Team New Zealand.
- 2024: Törnqvist fielded teams in both the 2024 Unicredit Youth America's Cup and 2024 Puig Women's America's Cup, raced in the AC40 foiling monohull. The team competed as Swedish Challenge powered by Artemis Technologies topping the Group B pool of non-America's Cup teams in both events and ultimately finishing fourth in both.
- 2025: In late 2025, Artemis Racing announced its entry to the SailGP championship for the 2026 season onwards. Iain Percy was announced as CEO whilst Nathan Outteridge rejoins the Swedish syndicate as helmsman. The team fosters Swedish talent hiring Julius Hallström from Rockwool Denmark SailGP team and promoting members of the Swedish Challenge 2024 Youth Americas Cup team in reserve sailor roles.

== See also ==
- Artemis Technologies
