= Groninger Studentencorps Vindicat atque Polit =

Dutch student association

Coordinates: 53.218717°N 6.568542°E

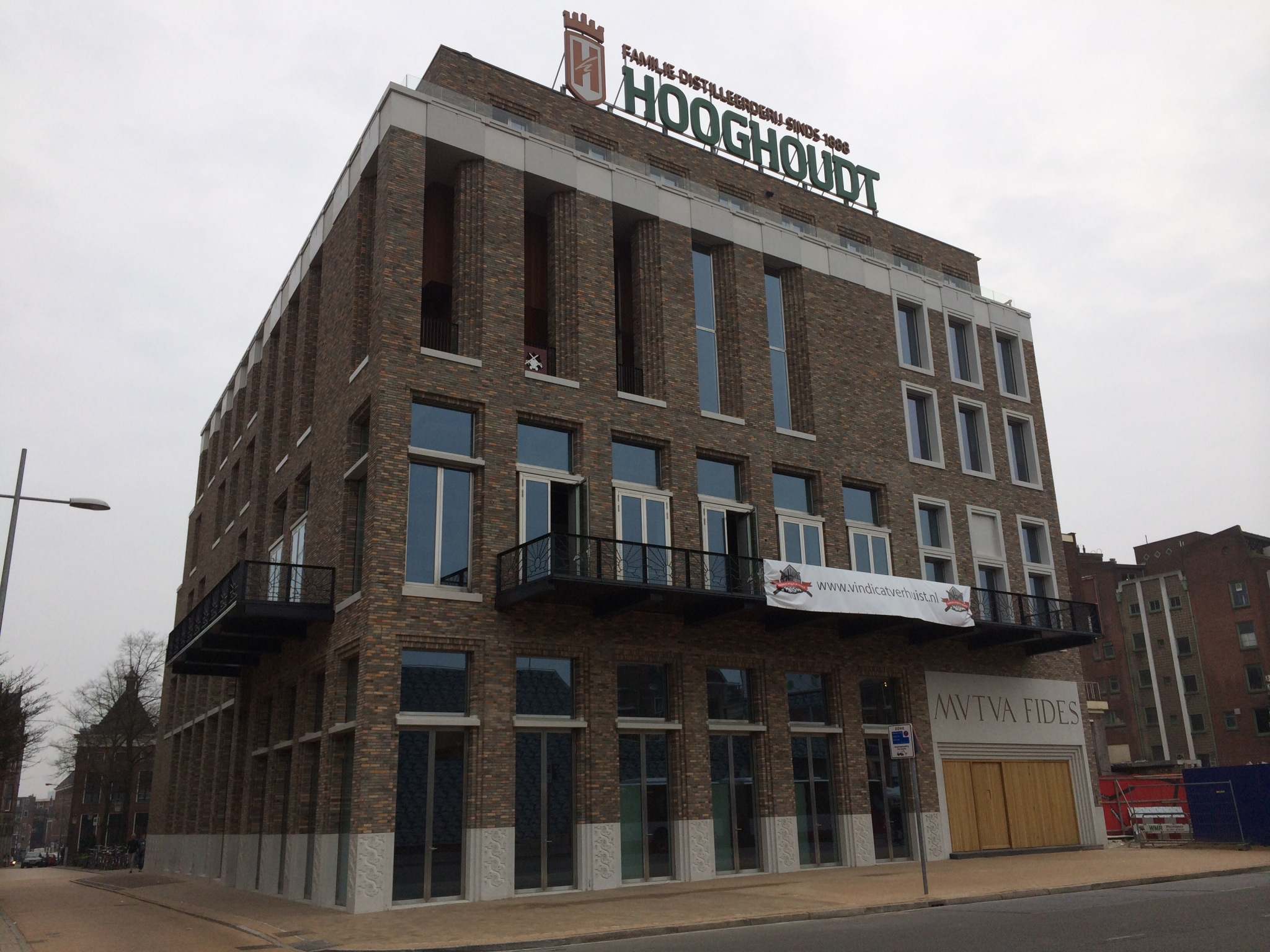
Vindicat building at Grote Markt 27 in Groningen.

The Groninger Studenten Corps Vindicat atque Polit (Latin for Uphold and Refine (lit. (The sword) avenges and (the file) scrapes)) is the oldest Dutch student association and was founded on February 4, 1815, as a reaction to attacks on students from local citizens. The first rector of the senate was B.J. Winter. With nearly 2500 members Vindicat is the second largest student organization in Groningen, a city in the north of The Netherlands.

Vindicat's society building has a prominent place at the central square of Groningen and is called Mutua Fides (Mutual Trust or Confidence). Its current building is relatively new and was completed in 2014 as part of a large redevelopment in the city centre. The old building was demolished in the same year. In 2005, a copy of the old Mutua Fides has been built in the miniature city Madurodam.

Notable (former) members include princess Christina of the Netherlands, prince Maurits of Orange-Nassau, van Vollenhoven, prince Bernhard of Orange-Nassau, van Vollenhoven, and Wim Duisenberg.

== Controversy ==
Vindicat has been involved in numerous incidents which have reached national news broadcasts. Most notably, in 1997 a hazing incident caused the death of 18-year-old Reinout Pfeiffer. The organisation had been warned to take measures, but in 2001, 2005 and 2016 hazing rituals caused further injuries, in addition to incidents of sexism in 2016 and 2017. It was also discovered Vindicat forced members to sign contracts that banned them from talking to the media. This led to new rules and guidelines with respect to hazing-related alcohol usage and reporting of incidents.

In 2016 the Dutch minister of education Jet Bussemaker called the response from the University of Groningen to another hazing incident "completely insufficient", which resulted in a short-lived proposal to completely ban all hazing activities for all student societies in Groningen. In the evaluation a committee instituted by the University of Groningen called for 'large cultural changes'.

After further accusations of disorderly behaviour in a restaurant, Vindicat's yearly subsidy from the University of Groningen was temporary suspended in September 2017.

In March 2020, during the early stage of the COVID-19 pandemic, 900 members of Vindicat travelled to northern Italy for a ski vacation. During the trip the governmental covid travel safety advice changed to 'only if necessary'. The large perceived corona risk motivated the Party for Freedom to ask questions in the House of Representatives. The students had to return earlier after the trip received widespread national attention.

In March 2023 two geese were rescued from a house belonging to Vindicat. One wall of the room the geese were found in had a spray-painted swastika, which caused further controversy.

== Gallery ==
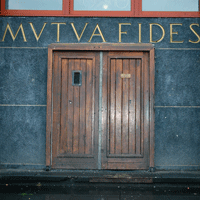
Main entrance of the old building, demolished in 2014

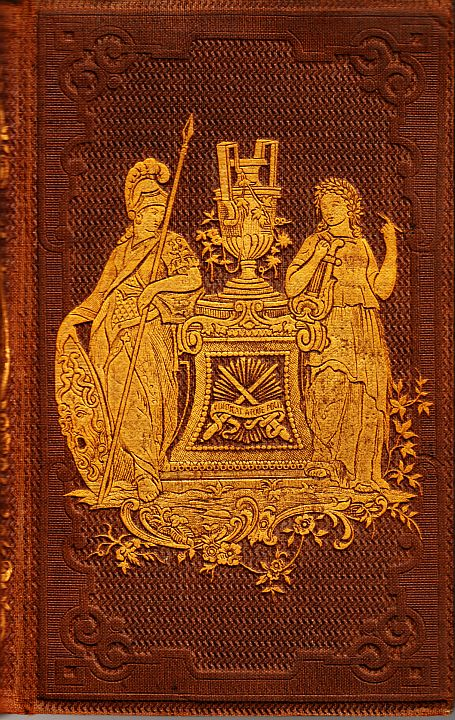
Cover of an 1854 Vindicat students' song book
