= Real Club Náutico de Barcelona =

Coordinates: 41.376826°N 2.182949°E

- Burgee
- Short name: RCNB
- Founded: 1876
- Location: Barcelona, Catalonia, Spain
- Website: www.rcnb.com

The Royal Barcelona Yacht Club (Spanish: Real Club Náutico de Barcelona, Catalan: Reial Club Nàutic de Barcelona (RCNB)) is a member-only yacht club based in Barcelona. It was established in 1876 and is one of the oldest yacht clubs in Catalonia, Spain.

This club is located at one end of Barcelona harbor. It is a well-equipped yacht club, with its own delimited area very close to the competing Royal Barcelona Maritime Club (Reial Club Marítim de Barcelona). The RCNB's area is an "administrative concession" from the Barcelona Port Authority and it houses the club's premises, as well as a restaurant overlooking the moored yachts that is open to the public.

The club has 175 moorings, of which 20 are available for hire. The remaining moorings are private property.

The Reial Club Nàutic de Barcelona has participated in many sailing competitions during its long existence. It has won a great number of awards.

The club organizes together with the fashion and perfumes company Puig the "Puig Vela Clásica" race that is run every year during the month of July, in Barcelona waters. The main feature of this race is that it is reserved for traditional and classical boats only. This regatta is one of the main classical sailboats races of all those celebrated worldwide.
