= Royal Maas Yacht Club =

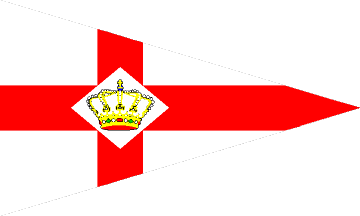
- Burgee

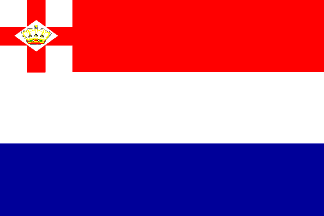
- Ensign
- Founded: 1851
- Location: Veerdam 1, Rotterdam, Netherlands
- Website: http://www.de-maas.nl

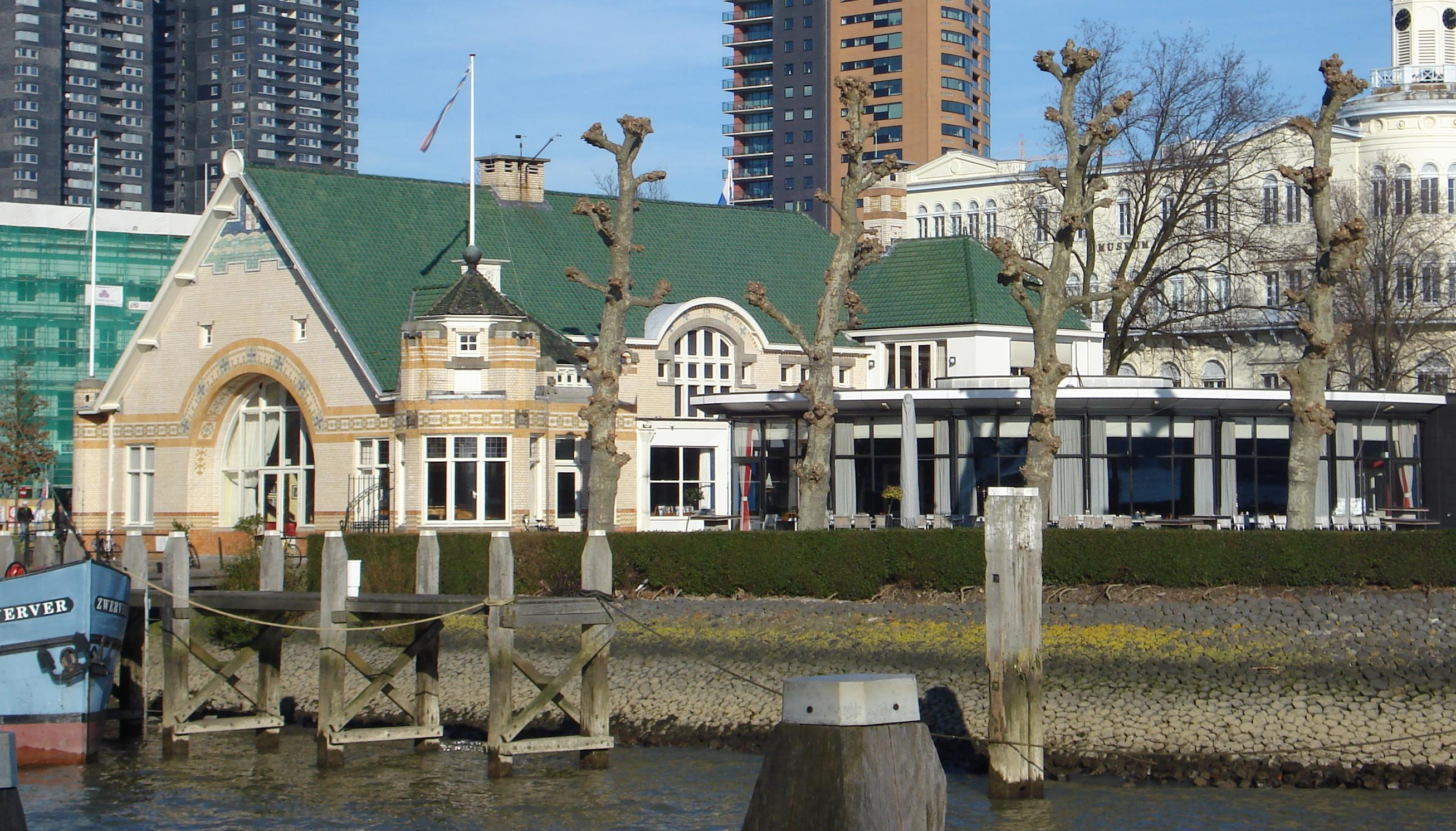
The clubhouse

The Royal Maas Yacht Club (Dutch: Koninklijke Roei- en Zeilvereniging De Maas) is a Dutch yacht club and rowing club located in the centre of Rotterdam.

Members are able to engage in sailing and rowing and the yacht club's name, de Maas, stems from the name of the river Nieuwe Maas flowing through Rotterdam.

The yacht club, founded in 1851, belongs to the oldest yacht clubs in the Netherlands. It has around 2500 members. The predicate 'Royal' was bestowed in 1901; in 1931 women were allowed to become a member. 'Maas' members have, by royal decree, the privilege to fly an embellished Netherlands ensign, showing a St George cross and golden King's crown (see picture).

The clubhouse designed by the architects Barend Hooijkaas jr. en Michiel Brinkman, was opened in April 1909. This elegant Jugendstil creation, which just survived the bombardment of the centre of Rotterdam in May 1940, is an important example of modern architectural art in the Netherlands.

The club's patron is Queen Beatrix; her son the Prince of Orange and the mayor of Rotterdam are Maas members. The renowned Dutch sailor Conny van Rietschoten, who won the Whitbread race twice, was an honorary Maas member.

== See also ==
- Algemene Rotterdamse Studenten Roeivereniging "Skadi"
