= Bosbaan =

Rowing venue in Amstelveen, Netherlands

Coordinates: 52°19′35″N 4°50′16″E

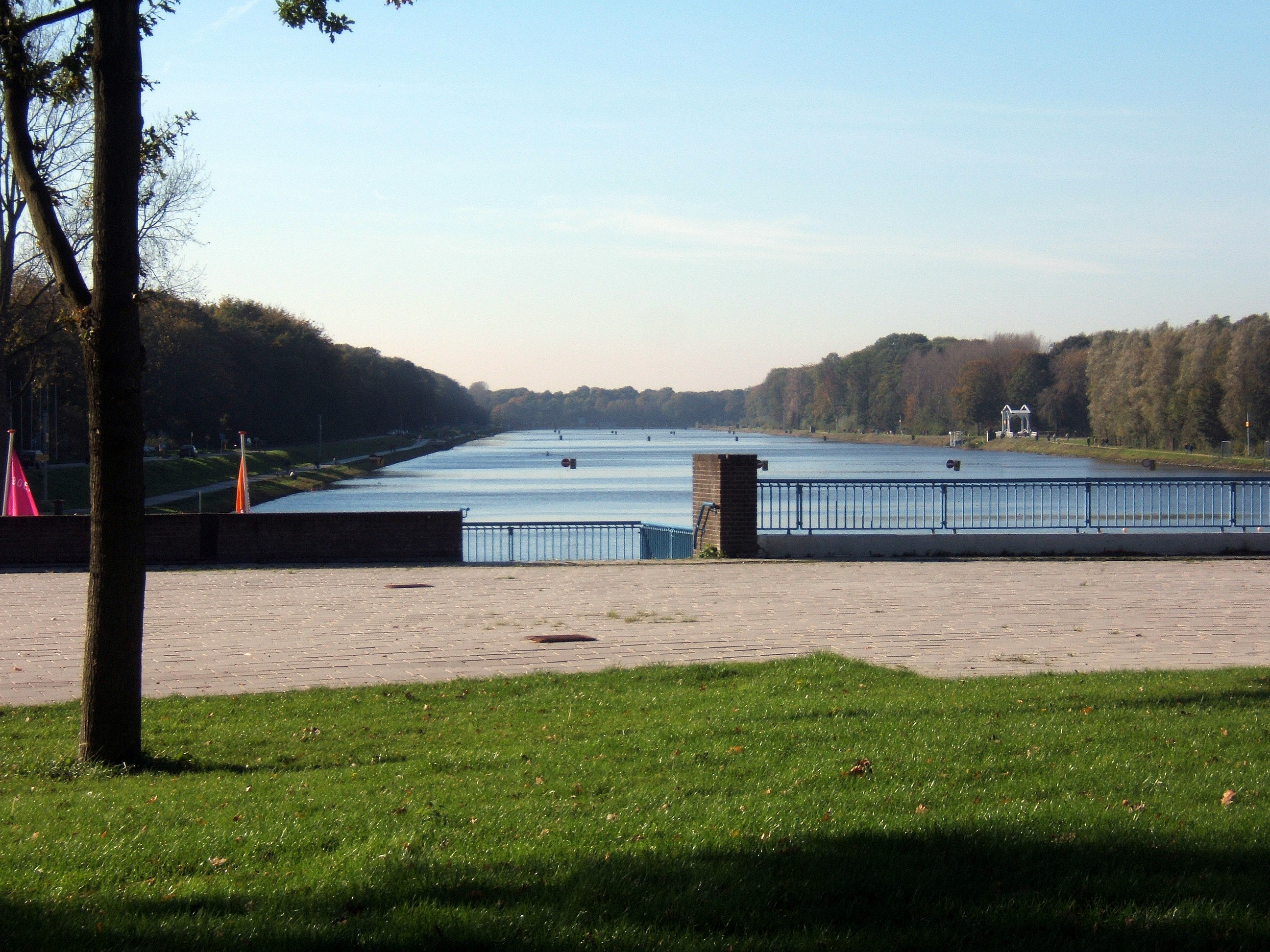
Bosbaan rowing course

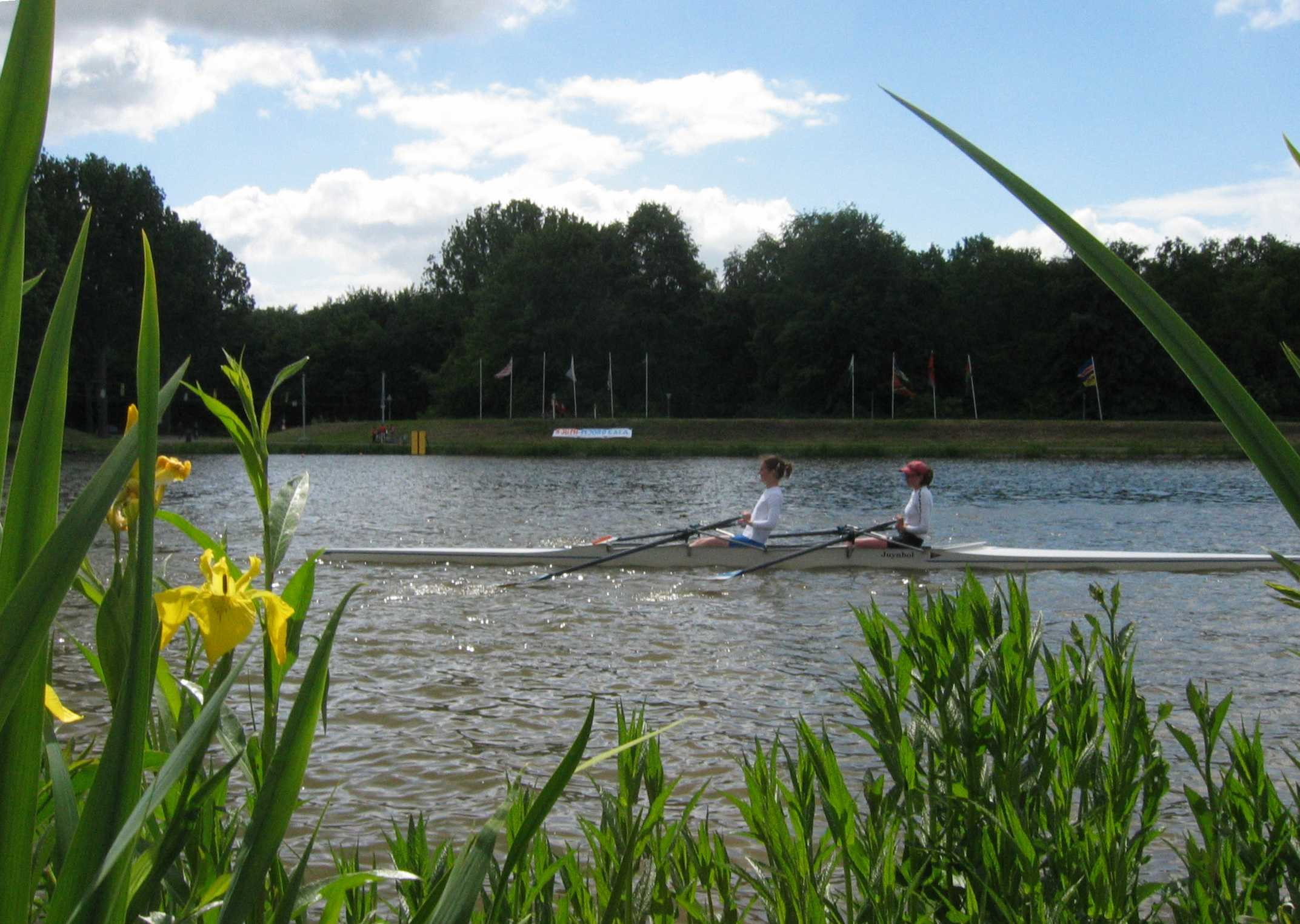
A Junior Double Scull at the Bosbaan

The Bosbaan is a rowing lake situated in the Amsterdamse Bos (Amsterdam Forest) in Amstelveen, Netherlands. Amstelveen is a municipality and a town in the Netherlands and is part of the metropolitan area of Amsterdam. Confusingly, all built structures at the north-eastern end of the course fall under jurisdiction of the city of Amsterdam. The Bosbaan (literal translation: Forest course) is the oldest artificial rowing course in the world.

The course was built in 1936 as part of an employment project and originally had five lanes, but was then widened to six lanes in 1954 when Amsterdam hosted the European Rowing Championships, the first international event where women were allowed to participate as elite rowers.

Following a major renovation in 2001, the Bosbaan measures 2200 metres in length, 118 metres across and features 8 lanes. In this reconstruction the boat storage facilities were also doubled in size, and the old grandstand demolished.

In July 2005 the first international championships (since the expansion of 2001) took place at the Bosbaan: the WU23 (World Championships Under 23). In 2006, the rowing course hosted the World Junior Championships and in 2007, it was the site of the 2nd Rowing World Cup Regatta. In 2014 it hosted the 2014 World Rowing Championships.

The Bosbaan hosts both the Olympic Training Centre for the national rowing association (KNRB) and the Vrije Universiteit student rowing club R.S.V.U. 'Okeanos'. Both are housed in a modern dedicated training and club facility, designed to be reminiscent of the former grandstand.

The venue is popular for leisure activities such as recreational running (the marked perimeter path is 5 km); running events; dragonboat races and angling.

The Bosbaan lies in parallel with the approach to Amsterdam Airport Schiphol's runway 09/27, at approx 2 km distance.
