= AC40 =

2024 America's Cup racing yacht

Development
- Year: 2022 –
- Role: inshore racing
- Name: AC40

Boat
- Crew: 4
- Displacement: 2,000 kg (4,400 lb) estimated
- Draft: 3.50 m (11 ft)

Hull
- Type: Foiling Monohull
- Construction: Carbon Fiber
- LOA: 11.80 m (39 ft)
- Beam: 3.38 m (11 ft)

Hull appendages
- General: topside-mounted ballasted canting T-wing foils
- Ballast: set in foils
- Rudder: centerline T-wing rudder

Rig
- Rig type: bermuda sloop
- Mast height: 17.92 m (59 ft)

Sails
- General: two semi-battened mainsail skins, one headsail skin
- Mainsail area: 63 m^{2} (680 sq ft)
- Jib/genoa area: 38 m^{2} (410 sq ft) J1; 32 m^{2} (340 sq ft) J2; 26 m^{2} (280 sq ft) J3
- Spinnaker area: N/A

The AC40 (America's Cup 40) is a one-design racing yacht used for the 2024 America's Cup preliminary events and planned to be used for the 2024 Unicredit Youth America's Cup and 2024 Puig Women's America's Cup matches. The 12 m (39 ft) monohulls feature wing-like sailing hydrofoils mounted on canting arms, a soft double-skinned wingsail, and no keel.

Unlike AC75s, all systems are battery-powered, and grinders or cyclors are not needed to accumulate hydraulic pressure, reducing the crew to just four (two helmsmen and two trimmers).

== See also ==
- America's Cup yacht classes
