= Youth Sailing World Championships =

Youth Sailing competitions organised by World Sailing

- First held: 1971
- Organizer: World Sailing

The Youth Sailing World Championships is an annual international sailing world championship, for athletes between the ages of 12 and 19, on 31 December of the year of the event. It is organised by World Sailing and the host club. It was first held in Livorno in 1971, and it has been held every year since with the exception of 2020 due to the COVID 19 pandemic.

== Editions ==
Edition			Venue			Participation			Ref.
No.	Dates	Year	Club	City	Country	Events	Athletes	Nations	Ref.
1	9–13 August	1971		Livorno	Italy	2	82	17	
2	19–24 August	1972		Travemünde	West Germany	2	132	27	
3	11–19 August	1973		Tróia	Portugal	2	67	26	
4	21–26 August	1974	Club Nautic Costa Brava	Palamós	Spain	2	72	25	
5	21–26 August	1975	Largs Sailing Club	Largs	Australia	2		14	
6	4–11 July	1976		Toronto	Canada	2	61	23	
7	6–13 August	1977		Quiberon	France	2	61	21	
8	9–20 December	1978	Royal Freshwater Bay Yacht Club	Perth	Australia	2	50	18	
9	27 July – 5 Aug	1979	CONI-FIV Livorno	Livorno	Italy	2	71	25	
10	1–8 July	1980		Fort Worth	United States	2	64	23	
11	6–16 August	1981		Sines	Portugal	2	71	25	
12	1–10 September	1982	C.V. Como	Como	Italy	2	70	24	
13	8–18 December	1983		Auckland	New Zealand	2	49	18	
14	12–22 August	1984	San Diego Yacht Club	San Diego (dinghies)	United States	3	46	21	
14	12–22 August	1984		Cowes (windsurfing)	United Kingdom	2	50	21	
15	21–31 July	1985		St. Moritz	Switzerland	3	134	30	
16	20–30 August	1986		Porto Carras	Greece	3	113	32	
17	19–29 January	1987	Botany Bay Yacht Club; Georges River Sailing Club	Botany Bay	Australia	3	75	23	
18	4–10 July	1988		Barcelona	Spain	3	85	22	
19	27 August – 7 September	1989		Montreal	Canada	3	72	24	
20	15–21 July	1990		Muiden	Netherlands	5	106	32	
21	10–15 August	1991	Largs Sailing Club	Largs	United Kingdom	5	109	32	
22	9–15 April	1992		Vilamoura	Portugal	6		26	
23	4–10 July	1993	Circolo Vela Gargnano	Lake Garda	Italy	6		39	
24	5–15 July	1994		Marathon	Greece	6		34	
25	12–18 July	1995		Hamilton	Bermuda	6		34	
26	8–18 July	1996	New York Yacht Club	Newport	United States	6		41	
27	25 July – 4 August	1997		Fukuoka	Japan	6		42	
28	28 December – 5 January 1999	1998		Cape Town	South Africa	7		42	
29	1–10 July	1999		Kuopio	Finland	6	199	38	
30	28 December 2005 – 6 January 2001	2000		Sydney	Australia	6	183	37	
31	2–12 July	2001		Crozon-Morgat	France	7	237	48	
32	18–27 July	2002	Lunenburg Yacht Club	Lunenburg	Canada	6	143	30	
33	17–26 July	2003		Madeira	Portugal	6	181	40	
34	8–17 July	2004		Gdynia	Poland	7	247	52	
35	14–23 July	2005		Busan	South Korea	7	226	48	
36	13–21 July	2006	Weymouth and Portland National Sailing Academy	Weymouth	United Kingdom	7	277	63	
37	12–21 July	2007	Sail Kingston	Kingston	Canada	7	219	51	
38	10–19 July	2008	Sailing Aarhus	Aarhus	Denmark	7	245	58	
39	9–18 July	2009	Clube Armação de Búzios; Iate Clube Armação de Búzios	Búzios	Brazil	7	272	58	
40	8–17 July	2010		Istanbul	Turkey	8	331	59	
41	7–16 July	2011	Sailing Club Uskok	Zadar	Croatia	8	346	58	
42	12–21 July	2012	Royal St George Yacht Club; National Yacht Club; Royal Irish Yacht Club	Dún Laoghaire	Ireland	8	343	60	
43	13–20 July	2013	Limassol Nautical Club	Limassol	Cyprus	8	350	61	
44	12–19 July	2014	Clube Náutico de Tavira	Tavira	Portugal	8	366	67	
45	27 December – 3 January 2016	2015		Langkawi	Malaysia	9	426	77	
46	14–20 December	2016	Torbay Sailing Club	Waitematā Harbour, Auckland	New Zealand	9	379	65	
47	9–16 December	2017		Sanya	China	9	374	60	
48	14–22 July	2018	Corpus Christi Yacht Club / Emerald Beach Hotel	Corpus Christi	United States	9	382	66	
49	13–21 July	2019		Gdynia	Poland	9	409	66	
~~50~~		2020		Salvador	Brazil	Cancelled COVID-19			
50	13–17 December	2021		Al-Musannah	Oman	11	345	59	
51	10–14 July	2022		The Hague	Netherlands	11	415	67	
52	11–15 December	2023	Iate Clube Armação de Búziosa; Buzios Vela Clubea; Clube Aretê Búzios – Sede Praia	Búzios	Brazil	11	399	61	
53	13–20 July	2024	Fraglia Vela Riva; Circolo Surf Torbole; Circolo Vela Torbole; Circolo Vela Arco; Lega Navale Italiana Riva del Garda; Fraglia Vela Malcesine	Lake Garda	Italy	11	415	69	
54	15–19 December	2025	Vilamoura Sailing	Vilamoura	Portugal	11	424	67	

== Medal table ==
Rank	Nation	Gold	Silver	Bronze	Total
1	France (FRA)	35	42	30	107
2	Great Britain (GBR)	32	17	22	71
3	Australia (AUS)	31	25	21	77
4	United States (USA)	30	20	18	68
5	Spain (ESP)	23	21	15	59
6	Poland (POL)	21	12	16	49
7	Italy (ITA)	19	24	30	73
8	New Zealand (NZL)	18	21	21	60
9	Israel (ISR)	14	15	13	42
10	Brazil (BRA)	8	3	9	20
11	Netherlands (NED)	7	13	7	27
12	Norway (NOR)	7	4	2	13
13	Germany (GER)	6	13	17	36
14	Singapore (SGP)	6	1	3	10
15	Argentina (ARG)	5	7	6	18
16	Sweden (SWE)	5	6	8	19
17	Switzerland (SUI)	5	4	7	16
18	Finland (FIN)	3	6	5	14
19	Canada (CAN)	3	4	3	10
20	Cyprus (CYP)	3	1	1	5
21	Hong Kong (HKG)	3	0	4	7
22	Denmark (DEN)	2	5	5	12
23	China (CHN)	2	5	3	10
24	Russia (RUS)	2	3	5	10
25	Ireland (IRL)	2	2	4	8
26	Turkey (TUR)	2	1	5	8
27	South Korea (KOR)	2	1	0	3
28	Greece (GRE)	1	7	4	12
29	Croatia (CRO)	1	5	2	8
30	Slovenia (SLO)	1	4	2	7
31	Portugal (POR)	1	2	5	8
32	South Africa (RSA)	1	2	3	6
33	Czech Republic (CZE)	1	2	0	3
34	Bermuda (BER)	1	1	0	2
34	Ukraine (UKR)	1	1	0	2
34	Uruguay (URU)	1	1	0	2
37	Austria (AUT)	1	0	1	2
37	Hungary (HUN)	1	0	1	2
37	Peru (PER)	1	0	1	2
40	French Polynesia (TAH)	1	0	0	1
40	Puerto Rico (PUR)	1	0	0	1
42	Japan (JPN)	0	2	2	4
43	Thailand (THA)	0	2	1	3
44	Chile (CHI)	0	1	1	2
45	British Virgin Islands (IVB)	0	1	0	1
45	Individual Neutral Athletes (AIN)	0	1	0	1
45	Malaysia (MAS)	0	1	0	1
45	Malta (MLT)	0	1	0	1
49	Belgium (BEL)	0	0	4	4
50	Guatemala (GUA)	0	0	1	1
50	U.S. Virgin Islands (ISV)	0	0	1	1
50	West Germany (FRG)	0	0	1	1
53	East Germany (GDR)	0	0	0	0
Totals (53 entries)		310	310	310	930

== Participation ==
IOC Nations	No. Sailors	Boats	First Year	No Year	1970s									1980s										1990s										2000s										2010s										2020s						
IOC Nations	No. Sailors	Boats	First Year	No Year	71	72	73	74	75	76	77	78	79	80	81	82	83	68	85	86	87	88	89	90	91	92	93	94	95	96	97	98	99	00	01	02	03	04	05	06	07	08	09	10	11	12	13	14	15	16	17	18	19	00	21	22	23	24	25	26
Netherlands Antilles	21	21	1994	16					?																			1		1					1							2	2	2	1	1	1	2	2	1	1	1	1	N/A		1				
Authorised Neutral Athletes	14	10	2025	1					?																																													N/A					14	
Algeria	4	4	1994	3					?																			1	1																				2					N/A						
Andorra	2	2	2009	2					?																																		1	1										N/A						
Angola	4	4	2003	3					?																												1						1						2					N/A						
Netherlands Antilles	24	21	1995	11					?																				2																				1	3	3	4	2	N/A	1	2	2	2	2	
Argentina	240	168	1974	39				3	?					3	3			1	1		1		1	1	1	1	2	2			2	2		5	7	3	7	4	3	5	5	5	10	6	8	10	6	7	12	14	13	13	12	N/A	11	13	13	12	12	
Aruba	8	7	2014	6					?																																							2	1	2				N/A			1	1	1	
Australia	384	268	1973	49			3	3	1	3	3	3	3	3		3	3	4	6	5	5	5	5	5	6	7	8	8	8	8	8	10	8	8	10	7	7	10	10	10	9	9	10	12	12	12	12	12	14	14	14	14	14	N/A		15			15	
Austria	141	91	1972	39		6	2		?				3	3	3	3			5	4		2		2	1	1	2	1				5		3	4		5	5	6	4	1	1	4	4	5	4	4	5	6	6	2	3	7	N/A	4	2	6	2	5	
Bahamas	22	21	2005	15					?																														2	1			1	1	1	1	2	1	1	3		1		N/A	1	2		2	2	
Barbados	4	4	2006	4					?																															1									1			1		N/A				1		
Belgium	192	136	1972	46		4	2	3	?	3	1		2	2	3	3			6	5	1	5	2	4	2	5	1	5	3	3	5	5	5		4			4	2	8	7	6	4	7	9	9	8	7	2	2	3	4	4	N/A	3	6	4	5	4	
Bermuda	101	72	1984	35					?									1		2			4	4	4	3		6	7	6	5	2	4	4	3	3	4	1		3	6	5	1	3	1	1	1	1	2	3	1	2	1	N/A	2	2	2		1	
Belize	4	4	2015	3					?																																								2			1	1	N/A						
Belarus	19	17	1999	8					?																								2		3			1		1	1					2		4					5	N/A						
Botswana	2	1	2009	1					?																																		2											N/A						
Brazil	342	234	1972	43		2			?	1	3	3	4	3					1				1	1	1	1	3	3	4	5	5	9	7	7	9	7	7	9	10	10	10	10	10	12	12	12	12	12	14	14	14	12	12	N/A	14	15	14	15	12	
Brunei	7	4	2010	2					?																																			4			3							N/A						
Bulgaria	21	19	1994	10					?																			2									1	1	1	3				4	4	1				2				N/A		2				
Canada	351	243	1971	54	8	6	3	3	?	3	3	3	3	3	3	3	3	5	6	4	4	4	5	6	6	3	8	8	8	8	8	7	8	5	8	8	7	2	4	3	10	8	4	6	5	9	10	6	11	10	10	10	10	N/A	13	11	12	13	14	
Cayman Islands	28	27	1976	16					?	1								2	3											3							1												2	2	2	1	1	N/A	2	2	2	2	2	
Chile	111	74	1973	21			1		?																					1									2	1		1	5	6	5	6	8	6	6	5	8	10	7	N/A	9	10	6	4	4	
China	68	51	1997	11					?																						1								8								8	3	8	10	14			N/A		1	6	5	4	
CIS	2	2	1992	1					?																	2																												N/A						
Cook Islands	8	8	2003	5					?																												1												1	2	2	2		N/A						
Colombia	21	20	1994	14					?																			1		1										1	1	1		2	2	2	2	1				2		N/A	3		1	1		
Croatia	130	100	1993	31					?																		1	1		1	1	3	1	4	2	1	4	3	4	4	2	5	5	5	11	2	2	2	4	3	6	8	7	N/A	7	8	8	7	8	
Cuba	5	4	2004	2					?																													4																N/A			1			
Cyprus	68	59	1986	20					?										4								2									2	2	2	3	3	2	4	3	4	12	8	5	1			N/A		4	1	2	1				
Czech Republic	114	91	1972	32		4			?										1								3		1	1	2	1	2	2	2	1	1	7	3	3	1	1	4	4		2	2	1	3	6	4	6	8	N/A	7	6	8	8	9	
Denmark	289	198	1971	50	8	4	3	3	?	3	3	3	3	3	3	4	3	5	6	3	2	3		2	1				2	4	6	6	6	6	9	6	6	6	6	10	10	10	10	12	11	6	6	8	9	9	9	9	9	N/A	6	6	7	7	7	
Dominican Republic	8	8	2021	4					?																																													N/A	2	2	2	2		
Ecuador	31	24	1996	13					?																					1												1	3	6	2		2	1	2	1		2		N/A	3	2	5			
Egypt	13	13	2015	8					?																																								2	1	1	1	3	N/A	2		2		1	
El Salvador	4	4	2005	4					?																														1	1														N/A			1		1	
Spain	354	245	1972	50		6	3	3	2	3	3	3	3		3	3			4	4	2	5	2	2	3	5	4	5	4	4	2	7	5	5	8	8	7	8	8	8	3	5	7	9	11	12	12	12	12	14	11	13	14	N/A	15	16	16	15	15	
Estonia	62	55	1999	20					?																								4		2		2	3		5	1	4	2	3	3	1	4	1	2				1	N/A	2	4	4	6	8	
Fiji	10	10	1995	9					?																				2																				1	1	1	1		N/A	1	1	1		1	
Finland	220	158	1971	52	8	6	3	3	?	3	3	1	3	3	3	3	3	3	3	3	4	5	2	2	1	1	7	5	3	3	2	1	7	4	1	3		6	1	2	6	9	3	4	4	2	4	8	10	6	6	8	8	N/A	7	8	6	6	4	
France	438	304	1971	54	6	6	3	3	?	3	3	3	3	1	1	3	3	6	8	5	3	3	5	4	5	8	8	8	8	8	8	10	8	8	10	8	8	10	10	10	10	10	10	12	12	12	12	12	10	14	13	14	14	N/A	16	16	14	14	16	
United Kingdom	454	315	1971	54	4	6	3	3	?	3	3	3	3	3	3	3	3	6	6	5	5	5	5	6	6	8	8	8	8	8	8	10	8	8	10	8	8	10	10	10	10	10	10	12	12	12	12	13	14	14	14	14	14	N/A	16	16	15	16	16	
Germany	388	266	1971	54	8	6	1	1	?	3	3	3	3	1	3	3	3	6	5	2	2	5	4	3	6	3	6	8	8	8	8	8	8	8	10	8	8	10	10	10	10	10	10	10	9	10	10	8	10	12	10	12	12	N/A	13	12	12	14	12	
West Germany	18	13	1973	7			2	2	?					2						2	3			3		4																												N/A						
East Germany	0	0	0	0					?																																													N/A						
Greece	161	126	1974	40				2	?				3		3	3	1		5	4	1			2	4	8	7	8	3	7	4	6	6	7	7	2	1	5		2	2	4		2	4	2	3	1		1	1	2	1	N/A	8	8	7	7	7	
Grenada	2	2	2024	2					?																																													N/A				1	1	
Guatemala	27	21	2000	13					?																										2		1	2	4	3	4		3			3				1		1		N/A	1	1			1	
Guam	4	4	1994	3					?																			1				2	1																					N/A						
Hong Kong	182	134	1972	43		6	3	3	?	3	3	3	3	3	3	3	3								2	2	1	2		1	2	2	2	2	2	2	3	1	2	5	2	2	3	3	6	8	10	6	10	13	6	8	10	N/A		6	7	7	8	
Hungary	107	73	1993	20					?																		1	1									1			4			2	6	5	1	3	8	1	2	4	3	11	N/A	8	10	10	14	12	
Indonesia	6	5	2005	4					?																														2										2	1			1	N/A						
India	31	24	1995	16					?																				1	1	1	1	1						3	1		1			4		2	5	3				1	N/A	2	2	2			
International Olympic Committee	1	1	1992	1					?																	1																												N/A						
Ireland	197	140	1971	48	2	4	2	2	?		3		3		3	3		3	6	5	2	4	1		3	1	4	1	4	6	4	5	6	6	6	1	6	6	4	4	1	6	4	6	4	8	8	8	4	2	4	2	6	N/A	4	4	6	6	4	
Iceland	3	3	2008	3					?																																	1												N/A	1	1				
Israel	238	181	1971	45	2	6	2	3	?		3		4					1	5	3	3	1	2	3	5	7	5	5	2	2	6	7	6	2	6		6	7	4	8	3	3	5	2	8	8	8	8		8	8	8	8	N/A	8	10	9	8	10	
United States Virgin Islands	68	44	1971	21	2	2		2	?																														1	4	2	1	4	5	2	4		1	2		7	7	5	N/A	5	3	3	3	3	
Italy	431	295	1971	54	4	6	3	3	?	3	3	3	2	3	3	3	3	6	5	5	5	5	4	4	6	8	8	8	7	7	8	6	5	5	9	6	8	10	10	10	10	10	10	12	12	12	12	12	14	14	14	14	14	N/A	16	16	15	15	15	
British Virgin Islands	11	11	1989	9					?														1																	2	2	1	1						1		1	1	1	N/A						
Jamaica	4	3	1983	3					?								2																											1										N/A				1		
Japan	310	215	1972	44		4			?			3					3	3	4	3	4	4	3	3	2	3	7	7	8	8	8	8	7	7	7	6	7	6	7	7	6	6	5	7	7	8	8	9	12	10	10	13	11	N/A	13	10	12	12	12	
Kenya	44	34	1985	11					?										6	4				4	3		5	1	3			6	5	4	3																			N/A						
South Korea	157	119	1972	29		2			?															1				2	2	2	8	2	8	4	4	4	4	6	10	7	6	3	6	5	8	8	8	7	5	7	8	8	8	N/A					4	
Latvia	33	32	2004	14					?																													1		1		1						1	5	3	2	4	1	N/A	3	4	1	4	2	
Saint Lucia	11	11	2007	9					?																																1		1	1	2	2	1	1		1	1			N/A						
Lithuania	52	46	1993	15					?																		1				1							3		2		3		3	3	5	4	5				3	5	N/A		4		3	7	
Luxembourg	9	6	1971	6	2	2	2		?						1									1														1																N/A						
Macau	3	2	2015	1					?																																								3					N/A						
Morocco	1	1	2025	1					?																																													N/A					1	
Malaysia	87	59	1984	19					?									1						1										5	6			5	3		2		5	4	7	7	5	9	14	1	2		1	N/A				5	4	
Moldova	4	4	2000	3					?																										2			1		1														N/A						
Mexico	157	124	1976	37					?	3			2	3	3	3		3					1	4	1		2	1	1	3	3	5	2	2	4					2	2	4	6	5	4	4	8	8	8	8	8	10	6	N/A	3	5	6	8	6	
North Macedonia	2	2	2010	2					?																																			1		1								N/A						
Malta	16	14	1986	10					?											2				1			1																				1	1				2	2	N/A			2	2	2	
Montenegro	3	3	2011	3					?																																				1									N/A		1		1		
Monaco	22	19	1992	12					?																	1	1	1	1	1					2			2		6										1			3	N/A				2	1	
Mozambique	4	4	2013	3					?																																						2	1			1			N/A						
Myanmar	22	12	1997	6					?																						5	2			2				4	5							4							N/A						
Namibia	2	1	1998	1					?																							2																						N/A						
Netherlands	353	255	1971	54	4	4	3	3	?	3	3	1	3	3	3	3	3	5	5	5	5	5	5	6	6	8	8	8	9	8	8	8	8	8	5	6	4	7	7	9	7	8	9	9	10	10	10	8	8	8	9	9	9	N/A	9	11	11	8	11	
Norway	205	157	1971	47	8	4	3	3	1	3	3	3	1	4	3	1		3	1			1		1	3	2	4	2	3	2	1	5	3	4				4	2	4	7	8	4	6	5	7	6	6	8	7	10	8	6	N/A	6	8	7	8	6	
New Zealand	393	272	1972	52		2		3	2	3	3	3	3	3	3	3	3	5	6	4	4	4	4	4	6	6	8	8	7	7	8	6	6	8	10	8	8	10	10	10	10	10	10	12	12	9	9	12	14	13	14	14	12	N/A		15	13	13	13	
Oman	12	9	2012	6					?																																					2	1	1		3			1	N/A	4					
Pakistan	3	3	1984	3					?									1																						1	1													N/A						
Paraguay	13	13	2007	10					?																																2	2	2	1	1	1	1	1				1	1	N/A						
Peru	55	52	1997	19					?																						1								1	1			3	2	2	3	4	2	4	4	1	2	4	N/A	2	4	4	4	7	
Poland	272	204	1972	37		4		3	?										3	2						4	8	4	4	4	3	3	8	4	4	4	3	10	4	3	5	4	8	10	10	10	10	10	11	14	14	12	14	N/A	10	10	13	11	14	
Portugal	269	185	1972	44		4	3	3	?					3	3	3			4			4	3	3	3	8	8	8	8	7	7	7	6	6	7	7	7	7	4	5	1	1	6	5	6	10	11	11	11	6	5	7	7	N/A	8	9	10	8	9	
Philippines	4	3	1993	3					?																		1																					1	2					N/A						
Papua New Guinea	5	5	1997	4					?																						1																		2	1	1			N/A						
Puerto Rico	72	56	1976	21					?	1								1	4	2																	4	4	6	3			3	3	4	2	2	3	2		1			N/A	1	6	6	7	7	
Qatar	1	1	2012	1					?																																					1								N/A						
Romania	7	6	2014	5					?																																							1	3			1		N/A				1	1	
Romania	2	1	1986	1					?											2																																		N/A						
South Africa	215	144	1971	39	2		3	3	?	3	3		3		3											4	8	8	5	5	6	8	7	4	8	4	4	8	4	4	3	6	6	10	10	7	7	8	12	8	6	2	4	N/A		6	5	6	2	
Russia	148	112	1972	26		4			?									2		4				3	3			1	5	5	5		6		3			1		2		2	2	8	7	8	8	10	9	8	10	10	13	N/A	9					
Soviet Union	5	3	1972	2		2	3		?																																													N/A						
Samoa	10	10	2003	10					?																												1	1					1	1					1	1	1	1		N/A		1		1		
Seychelles	24	23	1993	11					?																		5	2	2						2			3	2	3		1							2					N/A	1	1				
Singapore	198	134	1984	33					?									1						1			2	2	3		6	5	2	4	4	1	4	5	8	8	9	9	8	7	12	9	8	11	14	5	6	5	10	N/A	3	7	8	8	3	
Slovenia	65	50	1997	20					?																						1						1	1		1	1	2	2	2	4	2	3	4	4		2		3	N/A	6	6	12	7	1	
San Marino	1	1	1994	1					?																			1																										N/A						
Serbia	18	18	2008	12					?																																	1	1			2	1				1	1	2	N/A	2	2	2	2	1	
Sri Lanka	4	4	2015	3					?																																								1					N/A			1	2		
Switzerland	271	184	1971	53	4	8	2	3	?	3	3	3	3	3	3	3	3	6	8	4	4	4	4	5	5	3	4		4	7	5	1	3	8	4	6	8	5	6	6	6	1	4	6	3	6	4	6	6	6	7	7	8	N/A	6	9	12	13	10	
Slovakia	22	18	2000	11					?																										1			2		4					5			1	1	1			2	N/A	2	2		1		
Sweden	271	190	1971	55	8	6	3	3	1	3	3	3	3	3	3	2	3	6	6	5	5	5	3	4	4	5	7	7	6	4	4	4	6	4	4	4	6	3	6	6	6	6	6	8	8	5	4	5	5	6	6	6	6	N/A	6	9	7	7	7	
Tahiti	16	11	1998	7					?																							2					1													4		3		N/A			2	2	2	
Tanzania	3	3	2014	3					?																																							1	1			1		N/A						
Turks and Caicos Islands	5	5	2015	5					?																																								1		1	1	1	N/A		1				
Thailand	55	44	1997	17					?																						2							1		1		1	1	4	2	9	3	3	7		2	2	10	N/A	3	1		3		
Chinese Taipei	38	33	1984	13					?									2																						1		1			1				5	4	8	6	2	N/A	1	3	2	2		
Trinidad and Tobago	3	3	1976	3					?	1																															1	1												N/A						
Trinidad and Tobago	8	8	2015	6					?																																								2	1				N/A	1	1		2	1	
Tunisia	8	8	2000	7					?																										1											1	1	1	1					N/A				1	2	
Turkey	162	123	1990	24					?															3	2									4	4	2		4		4	1	4	4	10	10	8		7	7	8	8	8	8	N/A	10	10	12	12	12	
United Arab Emirates	16	15	1983	11					?								1			1	3	1	1	1	2																	2												N/A	2	1		1		
Ukraine	44	37	1993	16					?																		2					4			5					1		2		2	2	4	2		1				4	N/A	1	2	2	6	4	
United States	430	294	1971	55	2	6	3	3	3	3	3	3	2	3	3	3	3	6	4	5	5	5	4	5	5	7	8	8	8	8	7	9	6	7	9	8	8	9	8	10	9	9	10	11	12	12	12	12	13	13	14	14	14	N/A	16	15	15	14	16	
Uruguay	68	51	1993	24					?																		1			1	1	1		1	1	1			1		1	1	5			1	1	5	8	8	8	5	2	N/A	4	4	2	2	3	
Uzbekistan	3	2	1999	1					?																								3																					N/A						
Vanuatu	2	2	2015	1					?																																								2					N/A						
Venezuela	11	10	1973	8			1		?					3																1												1	1							2		1	1	N/A						
Saint Vincent and the Grenadines	4	4	2023	3					?																																													N/A			1	2	1	
Yugoslavia	9	6	1979	3					?				3			3				3																																		N/A						
Zimbabwe	22	19	1981	11					?						3	3		2		2	2			1	1			3	1			2																2						N/A						
Boats			–		41	66	43	47	?	42	41	34	47	43	48	47	33	34	111	90	60	66	59	89	92	98	140	138	132	133	144	146	143	134	172	108	135	176	162	205	163	186	200	238	244	248	248	261	299	264	255	265	281	N/A	251	310	287	307	311	
Sailors			–		82	132	67	72	?	61	61	50	71	64	71	70	49	96	134	113	75	85	72	106	109	130	178	175	166	171	187	205	196	183	237	143	181	247	226	277	219	245	272	331	346	343	350	366	426	379	374	382	409	N/A	345	415	399	415	424	

== Equipment ==
Event	Class	Gender	Year																																																						
			71	72	73	74	75	76	77	78	79	80	81	82	83	84	85	86	87	88	89	90	91	92	93	94	95	96	97	98	99	00	01	02	03	04	05	06	07	08	09	10	11	12	13	14	15	16	17	18	19	(20)	21	22	23	24	25
One-person dinghies	Byte	B																																																							
One-person dinghies	Byte	G																														●		●																							
One-person dinghies	Europe	B				O			O		O			O						O																																					
One-person dinghies	Europe	G				O			O		O			O						O				●																																	
One-person dinghies	Laser	B			O		O	O		O		O	O		O	O	O	O	O		O	●	●	●	●	●	●	●	●	●	●	●	●	●	●	●	●	●	●	●																	
One-person dinghies	Laser	G			O		O	O		O		O	O		O	O	O	O	O		O																																				
One-person dinghies	Laser Radial	B																																							●	●	●	●	●	●	●	●	●	●	●	(●)	●	●	●	●	●
One-person dinghies	Laser Radial	G																				●	●		●	●	●	●	●	●	●		●		●	●	●	●	●	●	●	●	●	●	●	●	●	●	●	●	●	(●)	●	●	●	●	●
Two-person dinghies	29er	B/Mx																																								O	O	O	O	O										●	●
Two-person dinghies	29er	B																																●					●	●		O	O	O	O	O	●	●	●	●	●	(●)	●	●	●		
Two-person dinghies	29er	G																																●					●	●		O	O	O	O	O	●	●	●	●	●	(●)	●	●	●	●	●
Two-person dinghies	420	B	O	(2)		O	O		O	O	O			O			O		O	O			O	●					●	●	●	●	●		●	●	●	●			●	●	●	●	●	●	●	●	●	●	●						
Two-person dinghies	420	G	O	(2)		O	O		O	O	O			O			O		O	O			O	●					●	●	●	●	●		●	●	●	●			●	●	●	●	●	●	●	●	●	●	●	(●)	●	●	●	●	●
Two-person dinghies	420	B / Mx	O	(2)		O	O		O	O	O			O			O		O	O			O																													(●)	●	●	●	●	●
Two-person dinghies	470	O			●										●			●																																							
Two-person dinghies	Fireball	O						●																																																	
Two-person dinghies	Flipper	O	●																																																						
Two-person dinghies	Laser 2	B										O	O			O					O	O			●	●	●	●																													
Two-person dinghies	Laser 2	G										O	O			O					O	O			●	●	●	●																													
Multi-hulls	Hobie 16	O																												●			●			●	●	●	●		●																
Multi-hulls	SL16	O																																						●		●	●	●	●	●	●										
Multi-hulls	Nacra 15	O																																														●	●	●							
Multi-hulls	Nacra 15	Mx																																																	●	●	●	●	●	●	
Boards	Mistral	B														O	O	O	O	O	O	●	●	●	●	●	●	●	●	●	●	●	●	●	●	●	●	●																			
Boards	Mistral	G														O	O	O	O	O	O	●	●	●	●	●	●	●	●	●	●	●	●	●	●	●	●	●																			
Boards	RS:X	B																																					●	●	●	●	●	●	●	●	●	●	●	●	●						
Boards	RS:X	G																																					●	●	●	●	●	●	●	●	●	●	●	●	●						
Boards	T293	B																																																			●	●	●	●	●
Boards	T293	G																																																			●	●	●	●	●
Boards	Formula Kite	B																																																			●	●	●	●	●
Boards	Formula Kite	G																																																			●	●	●	●	●
Total			2	2	2	2	2	2	2	2	2	2	2	2	2	3	3	3	3	3	3	5	5	6	6	6	6	6	6	6	6	6	6	6	6	7	7	7	7	7	7	8	8	8	8	8	9	9	9	9	9		11	11	11	11	11

Gender Guide
O (Open)
(2) (Open) in two age bands
B (Boys)
G (Girls)
Mx (Mixed) Male and Female Pair
BM (Boys/Mixed) Male/Male Pair or a Male/Female Pair

== One Person Dinghy ==
=== Open One Person Dinghy ===
Class	Year	Nations	No. Entries	Gold	Silver	Bronze	Ref.
ILCA	1973	Portugal	19	Augie Diaz (USA)	Jorgen Pudenz (GER)	José Luis Doreste Blanco (ESP)	
Europe	1974	Spain	22	A. Navarro (ESP)	C. Gilbert (NZL)	M. Hamann (GER)	
ILCA	1975	United Kingdom		Carl Buchan (USA)	Hans Jorn Kongelf (NOR)	Johan Ling-Vannechs (SWE)	
ILCA	1976	Canada	23	A Svensson (SWE)	Bechardt (FIN)	Frederiksen (DEN)	
Europe	1977	France	21	Gustav Doreste (ESP)	R. Moner (FRA)	P. Jokinen (FIN)	
ILCA	1978	Australia	18	Andrew Menkart (USA)	Willie Packer (AUS)	Peter Kempkers (NZL)	
Europe	1979	Italy	23	Louis Doreste (ESP)	Russell Coutts (NZL)	Mattias Soderstrom (SWE)	
ILCA	1980	United States	22	Derek (Larry) Kleist (AUS)	Andrew Brown (GBR)	Walter Rothlauf (GER)	
ILCA	1981	Portugal	25	Russell Coutts (NZL)	Thierry Berger (FRA)	Charley Mckee (USA)	
Europe	1982	Italy	24	Tom Rindell (FIN)	Stephan Lange (GER)	Fabio Ascoli (ITA)	
ILCA	1983	New Zealand	17	John Irvine (NZL)	Armandos Ortolano (GRE)	Roland Gaebler (GER)	
ILCA	1984b	United States	18	Stuart Childerley (GBR)	Gianluca Grisoli (ITA)	Hank Lammens (CAN)	
ILCA	1985	Switzerland	28	Andrew Beadsworth (GBR)	Jan Henk Maas (NED)	Andreas Willim (GER)	
ILCA	1986	Greece	26	Kevin Hall (USA)	Richard Clarke (CAN)	Adam Beashel (AUS)	
ILCA	1987	Australia	18	Rodney Davies (CAN)	Alejandro Colla (ARG)	Nik Burfoot (NZL)	
Europe	1988	Spain	17	Risto Tapper (FIN)	Peer Moberg (NOR)	Gabrielli Benussi (ITA)	
ILCA	1989	Canada	20	Stu Bannatyne (NZL)	Robert David Hirst (IVB)	Joshua Faddy (AUS)	

=== Boy's One Person Dinghy ===
Class	Year	Nations	No. Entries	Gold	Silver	Bronze	Ref.
ILCA 6 or 7	1990	Netherlands	28	Dean Barker (NZL)	Brian Camet (USA)	B. Kitchen (CAN)	
ILCA 6 or 7	1991	United Kingdom	30	Robert Scheidt (BRA)	Dean Barker (NZL)	Rudolfa Somaini (ARG)	
ILCA 6 or 7	1992	Portugal	23	Michael Hare (USA)	Dan Slater (NZL)	Mateusz Kusznierewicz (POL)	
ILCA 6 or 7	1993	Italy	38	Karl Suneson (SWE)	Julien Bicler (FRA)	Iain Percy (GBR)	
ILCA 6 or 7	1994	Greece	35	Dan Slater (NZL)	Ben Ainslie (GBR)	Philipp Buchert (GER)	
ILCA 6 or 7	1995	Bermuda	36	Ben Ainslie (GBR)	Philipp Buchert (GER)	Gustavo Lima (POR)	
ILCA 6 or 7	1996	United States	36	Simon Small (NZL)	Filipe Silva (POR)	Matthew Von Bibra (AUS)	
ILCA 6 or 7	1997	Japan	35	Daniel Wallberg (SWE)	Bernard Luttmer (CAN)	Francisco Sanchez Ferrer (ESP)	
ILCA 6 or 7	1998	South Africa	33	Gareth Blanckenberg (RSA)	Marin Misura (CRO)	Francisco Sanchez Ferrer (ESP)	
ILCA 6 or 7	1999	Finland	31	Francisco Sanchez Ferrer (ESP)	Marin Misura (CRO)	Andrew Murdoch (NZL)	
ILCA 6 or 7	2000	Australia	30	Ben Austin (AUS)	Andrew Murdoch (NZL)	Thomas Le Breton (FRA)	
ILCA 6 or 7	2001	France	39	Mark Powell (GBR)	Ben Lamb (AUS)	John Eloff (RSA)	
ILCA 6 or 7	2002	Canada	24	Andrew Campbell (USA)	Ivan Kljakovic Gaspic (CRO)	Tobias Schadewaldt (GER)	
ILCA 6 or 7	2003	Portugal	33	Ricky Ironmonger (AUS)	Norbert Wilandt (POL)	Tonci Stipanovic (CRO)	
ILCA 6 or 7	2004	Poland	41	Nick Thompson (GBR)	Towci Stipanovic (CRO)	Simon Grotelueschen (GER)	
ILCA 6 or 7	2005	South Korea	36	Giles Scott (GBR)	Jean Baptiste Bernaz (FRA)	Rutger Van Schaardenburg (NED)	
ILCA 6 or 7	2006	United Kingdom	44	Luke Ramsay (CAN)	Emil Cedergard (SWE)	Igor Lisovenka (RUS)	
ILCA 6 or 7	2007	Canada	38	Pavlos Kontides (CYP)	Josh Junior (NZL)	Philipp Buhl (GER)	
ILCA 6 or 7	2008	Denmark	45	Pavlos Kontides (CYP)	Luke Lawrence (USA)	Sam Meech (NZL)	
ILCA 6 or 7	2009	Brazil	52	Sam Meech (NZL)	Tomás Pellejero (ARG)	Pascal Timshel (DEN)	
ILCA 6 or 7	2010	Turkey		Thomas Saunders (NZL)	Keerati Bualong (MAS)	Giovanni Coccoluto (ITA)	
ILCA 6 or 7	2011	Zadar		Maxime Mazard (FRA)	San-Luka Zelko (SLO)	Giovanni Coccoluto (ITA)	
ILCA 6 or 7	2012	Ireland		Mark Spearman (AUS)	Finn Lynch (IRL)	Hermann Tomasgaard (NOR)	
ILCA 6 or 7	2013	Cyprus		Juanky Perdomo (PUR)	Joel Rodríguez (ESP)	Sébastien Schneiter (SUI)	
ILCA 6 or 7	2014	Tavira		Joel Rodríguez (ESP)	Seafra Guilfoyle (IRL)	Ryan Lo (SIN)	
ILCA 6 or 7	2015	Langkawi		Alistair Young (AUS)	George Gautrey (NZL)	Daniel Whiteley (GBR)	
ILCA 6 or 7	2016	Auckland		Finnian Alexander (AUS)	Paolo Giargia (ITA)	Carrson Pearce (USA)	
ILCA 6 or 7	2017	Sanya		Maor Ben Hrosh (ISR)	Daniil Krutskikh (RUS)	Guido Gallinaro (ITA)	
ILCA 6 or 7	2018	Corpus Christi		Josh Armit (NZL)	Juan Cardozo (ARG)	Zac Littlewood (AUS)	
ILCA 6 or 7	2019	Gdynia		Yiğit Yalçın Çıtak (TUR)	Zac Littlewood (AUS)	Tytus Butowski (POL)	
ILCA 6	2020	Brazil	CANCELLED DUE TO COVID				
ILCA 6	2021	Al-Mussanah		Sebastian Kempe (BER)	Luka Zabukovec (SLO)	José Saraiva (POR)	
ILCA 6	2022	Netherlands		Rocco Wright (IRE)	Sebastian Kempe (BER)	Ole Schweckendiek (GER)	
ILCA 6	2023	Brazil		Mattia Cesana (ITA)	Luka Zabukovec (SLO)	João Pontes (POR)	
ILCA 6	2024	Italy		Antonio Pascali (ITA)	Hidde Schraffordt (NED)	Weka Bhanubandh (THA)	
ILCA 6	2025	Portugal		David Coates (USA)	Jiří Tomeš (CZE)	Emilios Boeros (CYP)	

m===One Person Dinghy – Female===

Class	Year	Nations	No. Entries	Gold	Silver	Bronze	Ref.
ILCA 6	1990	Netherlands	11	Giselle Camet (USA)	L. Andrew (CAN)	Robeta Zucchinetti (ITA)	
ILCA 6	1991	United Kingdom	16	Carolijn Brouwer (NED)	Sabine Schumann (GER)	Katrina Percy (GBR)	
Europe	1992	Portugal	15	Severine Blondet (FRA)	Maria Martin (ESP)	Lilian Bauer (GER)	
ILCA 6	1993	Italy	21	Camilla Pedersen (NOR)	Roberta Zucchinetti (ITA)	Sara Dahlberg (SWE)	
ILCA 6	1994	Greece	18	Shelley Hesson (NZL)	Doris Wetzel (GER)	Sara Ahlen (SWE)	
ILCA 6	1995	Bermuda	23	Sarah Blanck (AUS)	Efi Mantaraki (GRE)	Petra Niemann (GER)	
ILCA 6	1996	United States	20	Anika Leerssen (USA)	Nicole Pellegrin (CAN)	Robyn Keen (RSA)	
ILCA 6	1997	Japan	30	Sarah Macky (NZL)	Clementine Destailleur (FRA)	Katarzyna Szotynska (POL)	
ILCA 6	1998	South Africa	22	Katarzyna Szotynska (POL)	Sarah Ayton (GBR)	Jo Dikkenberg (AUS)	
ILCA 6	1999	Finland	24	Sophie De Turckheim (FRA)	Sara Winther (NZL)	Amanda Clark (USA)	
Byte	2000	Australia	23	Siren Sundby (NOR)	Kalarzyna Brzoska (POL)	Hanne Jansch (GER)	
ILCA 6	2001	France	26	Wiebke Schroder (GER)	Kate O’Brien (NZL)	Natalie Sarah Lloyd (GBR)	
Byte	2002	Canada	20	Jennifer Spalding (CAN)	Karin Soderstrom (SWE)	Paige Railey (USA)	
ILCA 6	2003	Portugal	24	Paige Railey (USA)	Krystal Weir (AUS)	Sarah Steyaert (FRA)	
ILCA 6	2004	Poland	31	Sarah Steyaert (FRA)	Jo Aleh (NZL)	Charlotte Dobson (GBR)	
ILCA 6	2005	South Korea	31	Paige Railey (USA)	Xu Lijia (CHN)	Alison Young (GBR)	
ILCA 6	2006	United Kingdom	42	Tina Mihelic (CRO)	Marit Bouwmeester (NED)	Maiken Foght Schutt (DEN)	
ILCA 6	2007	Canada	34	Gabrielle King (AUS)	Anne Haeger (USA)	Sarah Gunni Toftedal (DEN)	
ILCA 6	2008	Denmark	40	Gabrielle King (AUS)	Susana Romero (ESP)	Cushla Hume-Merry (NZL)	
ILCA 6	2009	Brazil	37	Elizabeth Yin (SIN)	Anne-Marie Rindom (DEN)	Mathilde De Kerangat 0 (FRA)	
ILCA 6	2010	Turkey		Michelle Broekhuizen (NED)	Heidi Tenkanen (FIN)	Erika Reineke (USA)	
ILCA 6	2011	Croatia		Tiril Bue (NOR)	Erika Reineke (USA)	Sandy Fauthoux (FRA)	
ILCA 6	2012	Ireland		Julia Carlsson (SWE)	Line Høst (NOR)	Cecilia Zorzi (ITA)	
ILCA 6	2013	Cyprus		Line Høst (NOR)	Agata Barwińska (POL)	Monika Mikkola (FIN)	
ILCA 6	2014	Tavira		Martina Reino (ESP)	Haddon Hughes (USA)	Monika Mikkola (FIN)	
ILCA 6	2015	Langkawi		Mária Érdi (HUN)	Hannah Andersohn (GER)	Magdalena Kwaśna (POL)	
ILCA 6	2016 Auckland	New Zealand		Dolores Moreira (URU)	Sandra Luli (CRO)	Carolina Albano (ITA)	
ILCA 6	2017	China		Charlotte Rose (USA)	Dolores Moreira (URU)	Daisy Collingridge (GBR)	
ILCA 6	2018	United States		Charlotte Rose (USA)	Emma Savelon (NED)	Valeriya Lomatchenko (RUS)	
ILCA 6	2019	Gdynia		Chiara Benini (ITA)	Ana Moncada (ESP)	Shai Kakon (ISR)	
ILCA 6	2020	Brazil	CANCELLED DUE TO COVID				
ILCA 6	2021	Oman		Florencia Chiarella (PER)	Anja von Allmen (SUI)	Théa Lubac (FRA)	
ILCA 6	2022	Netherlands		Eve McMahon (IRL)	Evie Saunders (AUS)	Roos Wind (NED)	
ILCA 6	2023	Brazil		Roos Wind (NED)	Emma Mattivi (ITA)	Sienna Wright (IRL)	
ILCA 6	2024	Italy		Maria Vittoria Arseni (ITA)	Hermionie Ghicas (GRE)	Isabella Mendoza (USA)	
ILCA 6	2025	Portugal		Irene de Tomás (ESP)	Hanna Rogowska (POL)	Mirja Dohl (GER)	

== Two Person Dinghy ==
=== Two Person Dinghy – Open ===
Class	Year	Nations	No. Entries	Gold	Silver	Bronze	Ref.
420	1971	Sweden	25	Mats Berglund (SWE); Per Larsson (SWE)	Geoffrey Meek (RSA); Felix Unite (RSA)	J Corminboeuf (SUI); Daniel Corminboeuf (SUI)	
Flipper	1971	Sweden	16	Fritz Hovman (DEN); Ole Sorensen (DEN)	Frantz-Otto Falkengren (SWE); Margareta Falkengren (SWE)	Olle Johansson (SWE); Thomas Norrby (SWE)	
420 u16	1972	West Germany	16	Shimson Brokman (ISR); Eitan Freidlander (ISR)	J.M. Belles (ESP); UNKNOWN (ESP)	G.W. Larimoore (USA); UNKNOWN (USA)	
420 u19	1972	West Germany	50	Jan Eric Vollebregt (NED); Sjoerd Vollebregt (NED)	G. Rietveld (NED); UNKNOWN (NED)	J. Bickerton (GBR); UNKNOWN (GBR)	
470	1973	Portugal	24	Antonio Gorostegui (ESP); Manuel Albalat (ESP)	Tommy Lufstadt (SWE); S Endlund (SWE)	Peter Winters (BEL); P Surkyn (BEL)	
420	1974	Spain	25	Thomas Estela (ESP); M Estela (ESP)	Robert Whitehurst (USA); David Whitehurst (USA)	Shimson Brokman (ISR); Eitan Freidlander (ISR)	
420	1975	United Kingdom		Robert Whitehurst (USA); UNKNOWN (USA)	Thomas Estela (ESP); UNKNOWN (ESP)	Murray Jones (NZL); UNKNOWN (NZL)	
Fireball	1976	Canada	19	Alberto Navarro (ESP); Gustav Doreste (ESP)	Rainer Froelich (SUI): Muntz (SUI)	David Barnes (NZL): Nones (NZL)	
Fireball	1977	France	20	Peter Melvin (USA); David Woolsey (USA)	Wolfgang Hunger (GER): Korte (GER)	David Souben (FRA): Souben (FRA)	
420	1978	Australia	16	Chris Dickson (NZL); David Mackay (NZL)	Rodney Beurteaux (AUS); Geoff Backshall (AUS)	Fernando Sallent (ESP); Alfredo Rigau (ESP)	
Laser II	1980	United States	21	Chris Dickson (NZL); Sean Reeves (NZL)	Peter Koskull (FIN); Marko Koski (FIN)	Allen Lindsey (USA); Peter Lindsey (USA)	
Laser II	1981	Portugal	23	John Shadden (USA); Ron Rosenberg (USA)	Fernando Leon (ESP); Bernardino Balle (ESP)	Peter Von Koskoll (FIN); John Von Koskull (FIN)	
420	1982	Italy	23	Fernando Leon (ESP): Nunez (ESP)	Denis Jones (AUS); Anthony Dean (AUS)	Hecht (GER); Zander (GER)	
470	1983	New Zealand	16	Jason Belben (GBR); Andrew Hemmings (GBR)	Andrea Mura (ITA); Paolo Brichetti (ITA)	Magnus Lundgren (SWE); Urban Lagneus (SWE)	
Laser 2	1984b	United States	16	Stefan Seger (SUI); Bruno Zeltner (SUI)	Dennis Jones (AUS); Damon Cook (AUS)	Davide Giubellini (ITA); Fabio Ferrone (ITA)	
Laser 2	1985	Switzerland	23	Jens Olbrysch (GER); Bernd Oster (GER)	Jorge Calafat (ESP); Carlos Torralba (ESP)	Piotr Dolinski (POL); Jaroslaw Goszczynski (POL)	
470	1986	Greece	23	Gwenael Berthet (FRA); Jean Francois Berthet (FRA)	Jorge Juan Calafat (ESP); Carlos Ivan Torralba (ESP)	Vasco Vascotto (ITA); Lucio Boggi (ITA)	
420	1987	Australia	15	Nir Shental (ISR); Ran Shental (ISR)	Jean-Francois Berthet (FRA); Gwwenael Berthet (FRA)	Michele Ivaldi (ITA); Matteo Ivaldi (ITA)	
420	1988	Spain	19	Maxime Paul (FRA); Dimitri Deruelle (FRA)	Alain Stettler (SUI); M Renkler (SUI)	N Bover (ESP); M Reynes (ESP)	
Laser 2	1989	Canada	13	Maxime Paul (FRA); Dimitri Deruelle (FRA)	Matteo Ivaldi (ITA); Alberto Predieri (ITA)	Ryan Cox (USA); K.C. Aalfred (USA)	
Laser 2	1990	Netherlands	17	H. Rocha (POR); J Dduarte (POR)	P. Katch (USA); N Cromwell (USA)	Jason Muir (AUS); Dominic White (AUS)	
420	1991	United Kingdom	17	Philippe Gildas (FRA); Tanguy Cariou (FRA)	Gustavo Doreste (ESP); Dimas Wood (ESP)	Alessandro Bonifacio (ITA); Nitja Gialuz (ITA)	

=== Two Person Dinghy – Male ===
Class	Year	Nations	No. Entries	Gold	Silver	Bronze	Ref.
420	1992	Portugal	17	Sylvain Mizzi (FRA); Baptiste Meyer (FRA)	Andrew Estcourt (NZL); Matthew Stechmann (NZL)	Joaquim Moreira (POR); Pedro Bessa (POR)	
Laser II	1993	Italy	23	Zeevi Kalach (ISR); Elad Ronen (ISR)	Gustavo Martinez Doreste (ESP); Dimas Wood (ESP)	Simon Cooke (NZL); Edward Smyth (NZL)	
Laser II	1994	Greece	22	David Ames (USA); PJ Buhler (USA)	Rodrigo Amado (BRA); Leonardo Santos (BRA)	Justin Steel (AUS); Christian Stevens (AUS)	
Laser II	1995	Bermuda	21	Nicholas Rogers (GBR); Pom Green (GBR)	David Ames (USA); PJ Buhler (USA)	Etiene Huter (SUI); Pierre Huter (SUI)	
Laser II	1996	United States	22	Mats Hellman (NED); Dirk-Jan Lucas (NED)	Christopher Draper (GBR); Daniel Newman (GBR)	Michael Bond (CAN); Michael Bassett (CAN)	
420	1997	Japan	25	Nicolas Charbonnier (FRA); Clement Faure (FRA)	Graham Vials (GBR); Joe Glanfield (GBR)	Yogev Joseph (ISR); Shachaf Amir (ISR)	
420	1998	South Africa	29	Matthew Davies (NZL); Kevin Borrows (NZL)	Shachaf Amir (ISR); Yogev Yosef (ISR)	Nicolas Charbonnier (FRA); David Deguine (FRA)	
420	1999	Finland	31	Nicolas Charbonnier (FRA); David Deguine (FRA)	Alberto Padron (ESP); Antonio Del Castillo (ESP)	Nicholas Bryant (AUS); Samuel Gill (AUS)	
420	2000	Australia	28	Alberto Padron (ESP); Antonio Del Castillo (ESP)	Panagiotis Kabouridis (GRE); Athanasios Siouzios (GRE)	Gavin Fee (AUS); Tom Burger (AUS)	
420	2001	France	29	Mattia Pressich (ITA); Giacomo De Gavardo (ITA)	Roy Junhao Tay (SIN); Dahui Ou (SIN)	Matthew Chew (AUS); James Seymour (AUS)	
29er	2002	Canada	21	Nathan Outteridge (AUS); Ayden Menzies (AUS)	Geoff Woolley (NZL); Mark Overington (NZL)	Guillaume Vigna (FRA); Thibaut Gatt (FRA)	
420	2003	Portugal	26	Nathan Outteridge (AUS); Ayden Menzies (AUS)	Le Loic Bacquer (FRA); Yannick Peduzzi (FRA)	Lucas Calabrese (ARG); Damien Saponara (ARG)	
420	2004	Poland	32	Nathan Outteridge (AUS); Iain Jensen (AUS)	Thomas Rahier (FRA); Mathieu Rahier (FRA)	Jonathan Mcgovern (GBR); Stuart Bithell (GBR)	
420	2005	South Korea	32	Wee Chin Teo (SIN); Terence Koh (SIN)	Wataru Saito (JPN); Hiroto Yoshinaga (JPN)	Tom Malindine (GBR); James Clark (GBR)	
420	2006	United Kingdom	35	Sebastian Peri Brusa (ARG); Santiago Masseroni (ARG)	Sam Kivell (AUS); Max Taylor (AUS)	Marcos Adler (BRA); Bruno Leal Faria (BRA)	
29er	2007	Canada	23	Henrik Sogaard (DEN); Søren Kristensen (DEN)	Paul Snow-Hansen (NZL); Blair Tuke (NZL)	James Ellis (GBR); Rob Partridge (GBR)	
29er	2008	Denmark	25	James Peters (GBR); Edward Fitzgerald (GBR)	Germán Billoch (ARG); Gastón Cheb Terrab (ARG)	Judge Ryan (USA); Hans Henken (USA)	
420	2009	Brazil	31	Philip Sparks (GBR); Ben Gratton (GBR)	Gabriel Skoczek (FRA); Thibaut Soler (FRA)	Benjamín Grez Ahrens (CHI); Carlos Vergara Infante (CHI)	
420	2010	Turkey	36	Jordi Xammar Hernandez (ESP); Joan Herp (ESP)	Joâo Villas Boas (POR); Tomás Camelo (POR)	Jeremy Bachelin (SUI); Alexandre Massard (SUI)	
420	2011	Croatia	34	Jordi Xammar Hernandez (ESP); Alex Claville (ESP)	Daichi Mototsu (JPN); Yuki Hino (JPN)	Angus Galloway (AUS); Alexander Gough (AUS)	
420	2012	Ireland	30	David Charles (ESP); Alex Charles (ESP)	Guillaume Pirouelle (FRA); Valentin Sipan (FRA)	Pieter Goedhart (NED); Lars Van Stekelenborg (NED)	
420	2013	Cyprus	31	Tiago Brito (BRA); Andrei Kneipp (BRA)	Matteo Pilati (ITA); Michele Cecchin (ITA)	Diogo Pereira (POR); Pedro Cruz (POR)	
420	2014	Portugal	32	Yia Jia Loh (SIN); Jonathan Yeo (SIN)	Mohammad Faizal Norizan (MAS); Ahmad Syukri Abdul Aziz (MAS)	Ibuki Koizumi (JPN); Kotaro Matsuo (JPN)	
420	2015	Malaysia	33	Will Logue (USA); Bram Brakman (USA)	Leonardo Lombardi (BRA); Rodrigo Luz (BRA)	Douglas Elmes (IRL); Colin O'Sullivan (IRL)	
420	2016	New Zealand	25	Wiley Rogers (USA); Jack Parkin (USA)	Ido Bilik (ISR); Ofek Shalgi (ISR)	Fausto Peralta (ARG); Martin Arroyo Verdi 0 (ARG)	
420	2017			Australia; Otto Henry; Rome Featherstone	United States; Thomas Rice; Trevor Bornarth	Israel; Ido Bilik; Noam Homri	
420	2018			United States; Joseph Hermus; Walter Henry	Australia; Otto Henry; Rome Featherstone	Poland; Kacper Paszek; Bartek Reiter	
420	2019	Poland	30	Seb Menzies (NZL); Blake Mcglashan (NZL)	Demetrio Sposato (ITA); Gabriele Centrone (ITA)	Tal Sade (ISR); Noam Homri (ISR)	

=== Two Person Dinghy – Male/Mixed ===
Class	Year	Nations	No. Entries	Gold	Silver	Bronze	Ref.
420	2020						
420	2021	Oman	22	Florian Krauss (GER); Jannis Summchen (GER)	Ian Clive Walker March (ESP); Finn Dicke (ESP)	Roi Levy (ISR); Ariel Gal (ISR)	
420	2022	Netherlands	23	Freddie Parkin (USA); Asher Beck (USA)	Roi Levy (ISR); Ariel Gal (ISR)	Ema Samarzija (CRO); Leon Scheidl (CRO)	
420	2023	Brazil	24	Quan Cardi (ITA); Mattia Tognocchi (ITA)	Zou Schemmel (FRA); Jean-Philippe Boudard (FRA)	Miguel Angel Morales Hernandez (ESP); Alejandro Martin (ESP)	
420	2024	Italy	24	Lisa Vucetti (ITA) vittorio Bonifacio (ITA)	Colin Postel (FRA); Théo Henry (FRA)	Miguel Padrón Ferrer (ESP); Luis Mesa Oliver (ESP)	
420	2025	Portugal	28	Sviatoslav Madonich (UKR); Dmytro Karabadzhak (UKR)	Ziv Shtub (ISR); Loya Sheffler (ISR)	Cameron Brown (NZL); Oliver Stone (NZL)	

=== Two Person Dinghy – Female ===
Class	Year	Nations	No. Entries	Gold	Silver	Bronze	Ref.
420	1992	Portugal	15	Tracy Hayley (USA); Linda Wennerstrom (USA)	Pauline Lecadre (FRA); Laure Fernandez (FRA)	Uta Koch (FRG); Sabine Haberger (FRG)	
Laser II	1993	Italy	15	Storm Nuttal (GBR); Sally Cuthbert (GBR)	Melinda Henshaw (NZL); Lisa Jack (NZL)	Lindsay Staniforth (CAN); Alison Matthews (CAN)	
Laser II	1994	Greece	15	Storm Nuttal (GBR); Sally Cuthbert (GBR)	Briohny Hooper (AUS); Amanda Miller (AUS)	Susie Wood (NZL); Jennifer Cheyne (NZL)	
Laser II	1995	Bermuda	13	Jessie Cuthbert (GBR); Sally Cuthbert (GBR)	Barbara Snieders (NED); Wynkhe Bodewes (NED)	Claudine Tosi (ITA); Frederica Meringolo (ITA)	
Laser II	1996	United States	16	Jessie Cuthbert (GBR); Sally Cuthbert (GBR)	Joanne Knight (NZL); Linda Dickson (NZL)	Laura Dillon (IRL); Ciara Peelo (IRL)	
420	1997	Japan	18	Marion Barbarin (FRA); Elise Garreau (FRA)	Johanna Innemee (NED); Lobke Berkhout (NED)	Paola Richelli (ITA); Geemma Fiorentono (ITA)	
420	1998	South Africa	18	Lisa Charlson (AUS); Sarah Roberts-Thomson (AUS)	Johanna Innemee (NED); Lobke Berkhout (NED)	Nicoletta Aloj (ITA); Nicole Spada (ITA)	
420	1999	Finland	22	Marie Riou (FRA); Anne-Claire Leberre (FRA)	Sonja Berger (GER); Sabine Walter (GER)	Nicoletta Aloj (ITA); Nicole Spada (ITA)	
420	2000	Australia	21	Victoria Rawlinson (GBR); Emma Rawlinson (GBR)	Melissa Bryant (AUS); Martha Leonard (AUS)	Manuelle Adam (FRA); Virginia Adam (FRA)	
420	2001	France	24	Melissa Bryant (AUS); Martha Leonard (AUS)	Emma Rawlinson (GBR); Victoria Rawlinson (GBR)	Marjolaine Le Moigne (FRA); Laurie Morvan (FRA)	
29er	2002		14	Pippa Wilson (GBR); Jenny Marks (GBR)	Elise Rechichi (AUS); Rayshele Martin (AUS)	Rachel O'Brien (NZL); Kelly Riechelmann (NZL)	
420	2003	Portugal	20	Elise Rechichi (AUS); Rayshele Martin (AUS)	Camille Lecointre (FRA); Gwendolyn Lemaitre (FRA)	Alison Martin (GBR); Bethan Carden (GBR)	
420	2004	Poland	28	Elise Rechichi (AUS); Tessa Parkinson (AUS)	Lydia Koppin (GER); Kristina Kummer (GER)	Pippa Wilson (GBR); Hariette Trumble (GBR)	
420	2005	South Korea	21	Marie Lumeau (FRA); Claire Bossard (FRA)	Megan Magill (USA); Briana Provancha (USA)	Mariana Basilio (BRA); Gabriela Biekarck (BRA)	
420	2006	United Kingdom	24	Belinda Kerl (AUS); Chelsea Hall (AUS)	Agueda Suria (ESP); Marta Martinez-Pons (ESP)	Sarah Tan (SIN); Tze Ting (SIN)	
29er	2007	Canada	18	Emily Dellenbaugh (USA); Briana Provancha (USA)	Sophie Weguelin (GBR); Sophie Ainsworth (GBR)	Hannah Nattrass (AUS); Michelle Muller (AUS)	
29er	2008	Denmark	18	Frances Peters (GBR); Claire Lasko (GBR)	Annemiek Bekkering (NED); Jeske Kisters (NED)	Hannah Nattrass (AUS); Michelle Muller (AUS)	
420	2009	Brazil	24	Martine Soffiatti Grael (BRA); Kahena Kunze (BRA)	Camilla Marino (ITA); Claudia Soricelli (ITA)	Griselda Khng (SIN); Cecilia Low (SIN)	
420	2010	Turkey	28	Linda Fahrni (SUI); Maja Siegenthaler (SUI)	Maelenn Lemaitre (FRA); Aloise Retornaz (FRA)	Lara Vadlau (AUT); Hannah Hanke (AUT)	
420	2011	Croatia	31	Lara Vadlau (AUT); Tanja Frank (AUT)	Morgan Kiss (USA); Christina Lewis (USA)	Nikole Barnes (ISV); Agustina Barbuto (ISV)	
420	2012	Ireland	26	Ilaria Paternoster (ITA); Benedetta Disalle (ITA)	Carrie Smith (AUS); Ella Clark (AUS)	Annabel Vose (GBR); Kirstie Urwin (GBR)	
420	2013	Cyprus	27	Carrie Smith (AUS); Ella Clark (AUS)	Nadja Horwitz (CHI); Carmina Malsh (CHI)	Ilaria Paternoster (ITA); Benedetta Di Salle (ITA)	
420	2014	Portugal	27	Silvia Mas Depares (ESP); Marta Davila Mateu (ESP)	Yahel Wallach (ISR); Stav Brokman (ISR)	Ewa Romaniuk (POL); Katarzyna Goralska (POL)	
420	2015	Malaysia	24	Julia Szmit (POL); Hanna Dzik (POL)	Nia Jerwood (AUS); Lisa Smith (AUS)	Maria Caba (ESP); Carla Diaz (ESP)	
420	2016	New Zealand	21	Julia Szmit (POL); Hanna Dzik (POL)	Alexandra Stalder (ITA); Silvia Speri (ITA)	Violette Dorange (FRA); Camille Orion (FRA)	
420	2017	China	25	Carmen Cowles (USA); Emma Cowles (USA)	Violette Dorange (FRA); Camille Orion (FRA)	Arianna Passamonti (ITA); Giulia Fava (ITA)	
420	2018	United States	22	Carmen Cowles (USA); Emma Cowles (USA)	Vita Heathcote (GBR); Emilia Boyle (GBR)	Violette Dorange (FRA); Camille Orion (FRA)	
420	2019	Poland	24	Madeline Hawkins (USA); Yumi Yoshiyasu (USA)	Neus Ballester (ESP); Andrea Perelló (ESP)	Theresa Steinlein (GER); Lina Plettner (GER)	
420	2020						
420	2021	Oman	19	Neus Ballester Bover (ESP); Andrea Perello Mora (ESP)	Vanessa Lahrkamp (USA); Katherine Mcnamara (USA)	Manon Pennaneach (FRA); Victoire Lerat (FRA)	
420	2022	Netherlands	21	Maria Perello Mora (ESP); Marta Cardona Alcantara (ESP)	Amelie Wehrle (GER); Amelie Rinn (GER)	Camilla Michelini (ITA); Margherita Bonifaccio (ITA)	
420	2023	Brazil	21	Joana Faulhaber (BRA); Gabriela Vassel (BRA)	Maayan Shemesh (ISR); Emilie Louviot (ISR)	Iakovina Kerkezou (GRE); Danai Giannouli (GRE)	
420	2024	Italy	19	Danai Giannouli (GRE); Iakovina Kerkezou (GRE)	Nicola Sadler Keen (ESP); Sofía Cavaco Torres (ESP)	Zeynep Çaçur (TUR); Zeynep Köy (TUR)	
420	2025	Portugal	20	Sabine Potter (GBR); Merle Nieuwland (GBR)	Emy Combet (FRA); Juliette Peyre (FRA)	Tessa Clinton (NZL); Amelia Higson (NZL)	

== Two Person Skiff ==
=== Two Person Skiff – Open ===
Class	Year	Nations	No. Entries	Gold	Silver	Bronze	Ref.
29er	2010	Turkey	18	Gael Jaffrezic (FRA); Julien Bloyet (FRA)	Alexandra Maloney (NZL); Sam Bullock (NZL)	Antoine Screve (USA); James Moody (USA)	
29er	2011	Croatia	23	Carlos Robles (ESP); Florian Trittel (ESP)	Antoine Screve (USA); Maximiliano Agnese (USA)	Max Deckers (NED); Annette Duetz (NED)	
29er	2012	Ireland	24	Carlos Robles (ESP); Florian Trittel (ESP)	Lucas Rual (FRA) thomas Biton (FRA)	Klaus Lange (ARG); Mateo Majdalani (ARG)	
29er	2013	Cyprus	29	Lucas Rual (FRA); Emile Amoros (FRA)	Ida Svensson (SWE); Rasmus Rosengren (SWE)	Markus Somerville (NZL); Jack Simpson (NZL)	
29er	2014	Portugal	30	Brice Yrieix (FRA); Loïc Fischer Guillou (FRA)	Quinn Wilson (USA); Riley Gibbs (USA)	Markus Somerville (NZL); Isaac Mchardie (NZL)	

=== Two Person Skiff – Male ===
Class	Year	Nations	No. Entries	Gold	Silver	Bronze	Ref.
29er	2015	Malaysia	31	Peter Lin Janezic (SLO); Anze Podlogar (SLO)	Jackson Keon (NZL); Nick Egnot Johnson (NZL)	Tomas Mathisen (NOR); Mads Mathisen (NOR)	
29er	2016	New Zealand	25	Great Britain; Crispin Beaumont; Tom Darling	France; Gwendal Nael; Lilian Mercier	Australia; John Cooley; Simon Hoffman	
29er	2017	China	30 Nations	France; Théo Revil; Gautier Guevel	Norway; Mathias Berthet; Alexander Franks-Penty	Argentina; Santiago Duncan; Elías Dalli	
29er	2018	United States	25 Nations	Norway; Mathias Berthet; Alexander Franks-Penty	New Zealand; Seb Lardies; Scott McKenzie	Australia; Henry Larkings; Miles Davey	
29er	2019	Poland	28 Nations	Norway; Mathias Berthet; Alexander Franks-Penty	Finland; Ville Korhonen; Edvard Bremer	Australia; Archie Cropley; Max Paul	
29er	2020	Brazil					
29er	2021	Oman	24 Nations	France; Hugo Revil; Karl Devaux	Spain; Mateo Codoñer; Simón Codoñer	United States; Ian Nyenhuis; Noah Nyenhuis	
29er	2022	Netherlands	24 Nations	Argentina; Máximo Videla; Tadeo Funes	Great Britain; Santiago Sesto-Cosby; Leo Wilkinson	New Zealand; George Lee Rush; Seb Menzies	

=== Two Person Skiff – Male/Mixed ===
Class	Year	Nations	No. Entries	Gold	Silver	Bronze	Ref.
29er	2023	Brazil	30	Hugo Revil (FRA); Karl Devaux (FRA)	Alex Demurtas (ITA); Giovanni Santi (ITA)	Ben O'Shaughnessy (IRL); Ethan Spain (IRL)	
29er	2024	Italy	29	Ewa Lewandowska (POL); Krzysztof Królik (POL)	Finian Morris (GBR); Charlie Gran (GBR)	Jocelyn Le Goff (FRA); Jules Vidor (FRA)	
29er	2025	Portugal	30	Szymon Kolka (POL); Bartosz Zmudzinski (POL)	Nolann Huet Des Aunay (FRA); Titouan Gresset (FRA)	Zion Brandão Da Cunha Faria (BRA); João Vicente Botelho Joppert (BRA)	

=== Two Person Skiff – Female ===
Year	Gold	Silver	Bronze	Ref.
2015	Finland; Sirre Kronlöf; Veera Hokka	Denmark; Lærke Graversen; Iben Nielsby Christensen	New Zealand; Greta Stewart; Kate Stewart	
2016	Australia; Natasha Bryant; Annie Wilmot	Poland; Aleksandra Melzacka; Maja Micińska	New Zealand; Greta Stewart; Kate Stewart	
2017 Sanya	Italy; Margherita Porro; Sofia Leoni	Russia; Zoya Novikova; Diana Sabirova	Australia; Jasmin May Galbraith; Chloe Fisher	
2018 Corpus Christi	Norway; Pia Andersen; Nora Edland	United States; Berta Puig; Isabella Casaretto	Russia; Zoya Novikova; Diana Sabirova	
2019 Gdynia	United States; Berta Puig; Isabella Casaretto	Malta; Antonia Schultheis; Victoria Schultheis	Sweden; Martina Carlsson; Amanda Ljunggren	
2021 Al-Mussanah	Great Britain; Emily Mueller; Florence Brellisford	United States; Charlie Leigh; Sophie Fisher	Slovenia; Alja Petrič; Katja Filipič	
2022 The Hague	Argentina; Amparo Stupenengo; Julia Pantin	France; Lucie Gout; Fleur Babin	Japan; Manase Ichihashi; Rinko Goto	
2023 Búzios	Poland; Ewa Lewandowska; Julia Żmudzińska	France; Sarah Jannin; Fleur Babin	Hungary; Boróka Fehér; Szonja Fehér	
2024 Lake Garda	Poland; Alicja Dampc; Alicja Tutkowska	Finland; Una Heinilä; Silja-Sophie Laukkanen	United States; Annie Sitzmann; Molly Bonham	
2025 Vilamoura	Great Britain; Lila Edwards; Amelie Hiscocks	Poland; Antonina Puchowska; Alicja Dampc	Argentina; Carolina Barceló; Agustina Argüelles	

== Multihulls ==
Class	Gender	Year	Nations	No. Entries	Gold	Silver	Bronze	Ref.
Hobie 16	Open	1998	South Africa	12	Billy Besson (TAH); Tamatoa Audovin (TAH)	Matthieu Souben (FRA); Gurvan Bontemps (FRA)	Andre Cahu (BRA); Victor De Azevedo Costa (BRA)	
N/A	N/A	1999		Discipline Not Included				
N/A	N/A	2000	Australia	Discipline Not Included				
Hobie 16 +Spinn	Open	2001	France	12	Romain Motteau (FRA); François Morvan (FRA)	Chris Kitchen (NZL); Mark Overington (NZL)	Robbie Lovig (AUS); Glen Douglas (AUS)	
N/A	N/A	2002		Discipline Not Included				
N/A	N/A	2003		Discipline Not Included				
Hobie 16 +Spinn	Open	2004	Poland	11	Tom Phipps (GBR); Jonathan Cook (GBR)	Julien Villion (FRA); Martin Bataille (FRA)	Juan Maegli Jnr. (GUA); Jason Hess (GUA)	
Hobie 16 +Spinn	Open	2005	South Korea	11	Evan Walker (AUS); Kyle Langford (AUS)	Tom Phipps (GBR); Jon Cook (GBR)	Julien Villion (FRA); Martin Bataille (FRA)	
Hobie 16 +Spinn	Open	2006	United Kingdom	13	Tom Phipps (GBR); Richard Glover (GBR)	Bruno Vilela Frey (BRA); Ricieri Vidal Marchi (BRA)	Jenna Mai Hansen (DEN); Jonahtan Bay (DEN)	
Hobie 16 +Spinn	Open	2007	Canada	15	Richard Glover (GBR); Andrew Glover (GBR)	Emil Landry (DEN); Jacob Dannefer (DEN)	Jason Waterhouse (AUS); Michael McCormick (AUS)	
Hobie 16 +Spinn	Open	2008	Denmark	16	Valentin Bellet (FRA); Romain Bellet (FRA)	Matthew Whitehead (RSA); Michael Ovenstone (RSA)	James Ellis (GBR); Andrew Glover (GBR)	
Hobie 16 +Spinn	Open	2009	Brazil	17	Jason Waterhouse 0 (AUS); Lisa Darmanin 0 (AUS)	Romain Bellet (FRA); Valentin Bellet (FRA)	Francesco Porro 0 (ITA); Luca Marsaglia 0 (ITA)	
SL16	Open	2011	Croatia	14	Martin Lowy (BRA); Kim Andrade (BRA)	Nicolaj Bjornholt Christiansen (DEN); Daniel Bjornholt Christiansen (DEN)	Rupert White (GBR); Nikola Boniface (GBR)	
SL16	Open	2012	Ireland	15	Rupert White (GBR); Tom Britz (GBR)	Paul Darmanin (AUS); Lucy Copeland (AUS)	Martin Manzoil Lowy (BRA); Kim Vidal (BRA)	
SL16	Open	2013	Cyprus	15	Isaac Mchardie (NZL); Micah Wilkinson (NZL)	Paul Darmanin (AUS); Lucy Copeland (AUS)	James Henson (GBR); Olivier Greber (GBR)	
SL16	Open	2014	Portugal	16	Louis Flament (FRA); Charles Dorange (FRA)	Jordi Booth Ferrando (ESP); Ruben Booth Ferrando (ESP)	Kim Vidal (BRA); Ant nio Lopes (BRA)	
SL16	Open	2015	Malaysia	14	Louis Flament (FRA); Charles Dorange (FRA)	Shaun Connor (AUS); Sophie Renouf (AUS)	Tamryn Lindsay (NZL); William Mckenzie (NZL)	
SL16	Open	2016	New Zealand	20	Tim Mourniac (FRA); Charles Dorange (FRA)	Romain Screve (USA); Ian Brill (USA)	Henri Demesmaeker (BEL); Isaura Maenhaut (BEL)	
Nacra 15	Open	2017	China	18	Max Wallenberg (SUI); Amanda Bjork-Anastassov (SUI)	Shannon Dalton (AUS); Jayden Dalton (AUS)	Lucas Claeyssens (BEL); Anne Vandenberghe (BEL)	
Nacra 15	Open	2018	United States	24	Teresa Romairone (ARG); Dante Cittadini (ARG)	Andrea Spagnolli (ITA); Giulia Fava (ITA)	Greta Stewart (NZL); Tom Fyfe (NZL)	
Nacra 15	Mixed	2019	Poland	21	Will Cooley (AUS); Rebecca Hancock (AUS)	Titouan Petard (FRA); Marion Declef (FRA)	Silas Mühle (GER); Levke Möller (GER)	
Nacra 15	Mixed	2020	Brazil	Cancelled due to COVID-19 pandemic				
Nacra 15	Mixed	2021	Oman	11	Thomas Proust (FRA); Eloïse Clabon (FRA)	Kay Brunsvold (USA); Cooper Delbridge (USA)	Axel Grandjean (SUI); Noémie Fehlmann (SUI)	
Nacra 15	Mixed	2022	Netherlands	14	Axel Grandjean (SUI); Noemie Fehlmann (SUI)	Daniel Garcia De La Casa (ESP); Nora Garcia De La Casa (ESP)	Tiphaine Rideau (FRA); Titouan Moreau (FRA)	
Nacra 15	Mixed	2023	Brazil	12	Daniel Garcia De La Casa (ESP); Nora Garcia De La Casa (ESP)	Cody Roe (USA); Brooke Mertz (USA)	Marie Mazuay (SUI); Clément Guignard (SUI)	
Nacra 15	Mixed	2024	Italy	12	Lorenzo Sirena (ITA); Alice Dessy (ITA)	Côme Vic Molinero (FRA); Fatima Tia (FRA)	Hannelien Borghijs (BEL); Sander Borghijs (BEL)	
Nacra 15	Mixed	2025	Portugal	13	Lorenzo SIRENA 0 (ITA); Alice DESSY 0 (ITA)	Marius PRAUD 0 (FRA); Emilie MANSOURI 0 (FRA)	Dylan TOMKO 0 (USA); Casey SMALL 0 (USA)	

== Windsurfing ==
=== Windsurfing – Open ===
Class	Year	Nations	No. Entries	Gold	Silver	Bronze	1st Female	Ref.
Mistral	1984a	United Kingdom	46	Knut Budig (GER)	Bruce Wylie (AUS)	Anders Bringdal (SWE)	27th / Jorunn Horgen (NOR)	
Mistral	1985	Switzerland	60	Keill Price (AUS)	Christopher Lawrence (AUS)	Paco Wirz (ITA)	28th Johanna Soderstrom (SWE)	
Mistral	1986	Greece	41	Christopher Lawrence (AUS)	Petteri Somervuori (FIN)	Nikos Kaklamanakis (GRE)	10th / Jessica Crisp (AUS)	
Mistral	1987	Australia	27	Robert Normann (USA)	Jessica Crisp (AUS)	Robert Gough (AUS)	2nd / Jessica Crisp (AUS)	
Mistral	1988	Spain	30	David Woods (AUS)	Raul Fiedler (SWE)	Asier Fernandez (ESP)	5th / Lisa Gullberg (SWE)	
Mistral	1989	Canada	26	Thierry Renault (FRA)	Gal Fridman (ISR)	Mathew Wemms (GBR)	unknown	

=== Windsurfing – Male ===
Class	Year	Nations	No. Entries	Gold	Silver	Bronze	Ref.
Mistral	1990	Netherlands	21	Ethan Passant (USA)	Mattais Bornhaeuser (GER)	Aaaron Mcintosh (NZL)	
Mistral	1991	United Kingdom	19	Carl Ouvrard (FRA)	Brendan Todd (AUS)	Kevin Lowery (USA)	
Mistral	1992	Portugal	16	Amir Levinson (ISR)	Scott Haladay (USA)	Marco Casagrande (ITA)	
Mistral	1993	Italy	26	Beaudel Moulson (AUS)	Stephane Jaouen (FRA)	Dean Tomlinson (GBR)	
Mistral	1994	Greece	28	Amir Levinson (ISR)	Stephane Jaouen (FRA)	Pawel Gardahaut (POL)	
Mistral	1995	Bermuda	25	Amir Levinson (ISR)	Pawel Gordasiewicz (POL)	Jon-Paul Tobin (NZL)	
Mistral	1996	United States	26	Przemek Miarczynski (POL)	Guido Willems (NED)	Julien Legrand (FRA)	
Mistral	1997	Japan	22	Ricardo W. Santos (BRA)	Julien Bontemps (FRA)	Curro Manchon (ESP)	
Mistral	1998	South Africa	20	Ricardo W. Santos (BRA)	Alexandre Guyader (FRA)	Nick Dempsey (GBR)	
Mistral	1999	Finland	21	Chi Ho Ho (HKG)	Michael Lancey (AUS)	Yoni Ben-Zeev (ISR)	
Mistral	2000	Australia	21	Joeri Van Dijk (NED)	Nicolas Guyader (FRA)	KingYin Chan (HKG)	
Mistral	2001	France	29	Joeri Van Dijk (NED)	Byron Kokalanis (GRE)	Kowk Fai Cheng (HKG)	
Mistral	2002	Canada	17	Tom Ashley (NZL)	Byron Kokalanis (GRE)	Jan Schenck (SUI)	
Mistral	2003	Portugal	21	Wing Ho Yu (HKG)	Mariano Benitez (ARG)	Byron Kokalanis (GRE)	
Mistral	2004	Poland	20	Kamil Lewandowski (POL)	Nimrod Mashich (ISR)	Federico Esposito (ITA)	
Mistral	2005	South Korea	17	Lukasz Grodzicki (POL)	Pierre Lecoq (FRA)	Juan Moreno (ESP)	
RS:X	2006	United Kingdom	29	Lukasz Grodzicki (POL)	Fabian Heidegger (ITA)	Pierre Le Coq (FRA)	
RS:X	2007	Canada	20	Pierre Le Coq (FRA)	Ron Asulin (ISR)	Dimitris Vlachakis (GRE)	
RS:X	2008	Denmark	27	Michalis Malekkides (CYP)	Thiseas Kampas (GRE)	Oliver-Tom Schliemann (GER)	
RS:X	2009	Brazil	24	Joseph Gueguen (FRA)	Michalis Malekkides (CYP)	Jorge Renato do Amaral Silva (BRA)	
RS:X	2010	Turkey	30	Mateo Sanz (ESP)	Cho Won-woo (KOR)	Pawel Tarnowski (POL)	
RS:X	2011	Croatia	33	Wonwoo Cho (KOR)	Mateo Sanz (ESP)	Louis Giard (FRA)	
RS:X	2012	Ireland	30	Wonwood Cho (KOR)	Mattia Camboni (ITA)	Maxime Labat (FRA)	
RS:X	2013	Cyprus	28	Kieran Martin (GBR)	Oleksandr Tugaryev (UKR)	Radosław Furmański (POL)	
RS:X	2014	Portugal	32	Yael Paz (ISR)	Mattia Camboni (ITA)	Radoslaw Furmanski (POL)	
RS:X	2015	Malaysia	29	Titouan Le Bosq (FRA)	Francisco Saubidet (ARG)	Brenno FRANCIOLI (BRA)	
RS:X	2016	New Zealand		Yoav Omer (ISR)	Sil Hoekstra (NED)	Chen Hao Chen (CHN)	
RS:X	2017	China	26	Yoav Cohen (ISR)	Chen Hao (CHN)	Sil Hoekstra (NED)	
RS:X	2018	United States	27	Geronimo Nores (USA)	Nicolò Renna (ITA)	Fabien Pianazza (FRA)	
RS:X	2019	Poland	29	Fabien Pianazza (FRA)	Nicolò Renna (ITA)	Liam Segev (ISR)	
N/A	2020	Brazil	CANCELLED DUE TO COVID				
T293+	2021	Oman	18	Federico Alan Pilloni (ITA)	Boris Shaw (GBR)	Ozan Turker (TUR)	
iQFoil	2022	Netherlands	31	Charlie Dixon (GBR)	Hidde Van Der Meer (NED)	Nacho Baltasar Summers (ESP)	
T293+	2023	Brazil	32	Stanisław Trepczyński (POL)	Leonardo Tomasini (ITA)	Noé Garandeau (FRA)	
iQFoil	2024	Italy	38	Federico Pilloni (ITA)	Igor Lewinski (POL)	Makani Andrews (USA)	
iQFoil	2025	Portugal	38	Peleg Rajuan (ISR)	Mattia Saoncella (ITA)	Rory Meehan (AUS)	

=== Windsurfing – Female ===
Class	Year	Nations	No. Entries	Gold	Silver	Bronze	Ref.
Mistral	1990	Netherlands	12	J.S. Cooper (GBR)	M. Schmidt (GER)	K. Bagdasarova (RUS)	
Mistral	1991	United Kingdom	10	Natasha Sturges (AUS)	Elena Branulec (FRA)	Erna Driessen (NED)	
Mistral	1992	Portugal	12	Natasha Sturges (AUS)	Erna Driessen (NED)	Elena Draoulec (FRA)	
Mistral	1993	Italy	17	Natasha Sturges (AUS)	Stephanie Cretiaux (FRA)	Agata Pokorowska (POL)	
Mistral	1994	Greece	20	Amelie Lux (GER)	Agata Pokorowska (POL)	Justine Gardahaut (FRA)	
Mistral	1995	Bermuda	14	Amelie Lux (GER)	Sandrine Nuvolone (FRA)	Sivan Yosefh (ISR)	
Mistral	1996	United States	13	Perinne Vancilve (FRA)	Miroslawa Rymko (POL)	Helen Cartwright (GBR)	
Mistral	1997	Japan	14	Miroslawa Rymko (POL)	Anat Kologny (ISR)	Anja Kaser (SUI)	
Mistral	1998	South Africa	12	Eugenie Raffin (FRA)	Anat Kolodny (ISR)	Wai Kei Chan (HKG)	
Mistral	1999	Finland	14	Natalia Kosinska (POL)	Marine Begaghel (FRA)	Belen Hernandez (ESP)	
Mistral	2000	Australia	11	Agata Brygola (POL)	Allison Shreeve (AUS)	Jenny Le Bihan (FRA)	
Mistral	2001	France	13	Zofia Klepacka (POL)	Marion Defay (FRA)	Dana Solev (ISR)	
Mistral	2002	Canada	12	Zofia Klepacka (POL)	Blanca Manchon (ESP)	Wai Man Chan (HKG)	
Mistral	2003	Portugal	11	Zofia Klepacka (POL)	Flavia Tartaglini (ITA)	Blanca Manchon (ESP)	
Mistral	2004	Poland	13	Zofia Klepacka (POL)	Anne Sophie Le Page (FRA)	Laura Linares (ITA)	
Mistral	2005	South Korea	14	Blanca Manchon Dominguez (ESP)	Anne Sophie Le Page (FRA)	Laura Linares (ITA)	
RS:X	2006	United Kingdom	18	Laura Linares (ITA)	Maayan Davidovich (ISR)	Malgorzata Bialecka (POL)	-
RS:X	2007	Canada	15	Laura Linares (ITA)	Moana Delle (GER)	nina Szymczyk (POL)	
RS:X	2008	Denmark	15	Laura Linares (ITA)	Maja Dziarnowska (POL)	Patricia Freitas (BRA)	
RS:X	2009	Brazil	15	Hei Man Hayley Victoria Chan (HKG)	Isobel Hamilton (GBR)	leonore Bosch (FRA)	
RS:X	2010	Turkey		Kamila Smektala (POL)	Isobel Hamilton (GBR)	Ofir Halevy (ISR)	
RS:X	2011	Croatia	19	Veronica Fanciulli (ITA)	Siripon Kaewduang-Ngam (THA)	Naomi Cohen (ISR)	
RS:X	2012	Ireland	23	Saskia Sills (GBR)	Naomi Cohen (ISR)	Veronica Fanciulli (ITA)	
RS:X	2013	Cyprus	22	Lu Yunxiu (CHN)	Marta Maggetti (ITA)	Sara Wennekes (NED)	
RS:X	2014	Portugal	21	Stefaniya Elfutina (RUS)	Shi Hongmei (CHN)	Marta Maggetti (ITA)	
RS:X	2015	Malaysia	21	Stefaniya Elfutina (RUS)	Emma Wilson (GBR)	Xian Ting Huang (CHN)	
RS:X	2016	New Zealand	27	Yoav Omer (ISR)	Sil Hoekstra (NED)	Chen Hao Chen (CHN)	
RS:X	2017	China	19	Emma Wilson (GBR)	Giorgia Speciale (ITA)	Ting Yu (CHN)	
RS:X	2018	United States	17	Islay Watson (GBR)	Veerle Ten Have (NZL)	Giorgia Speciale (ITA)	
RS:X	2019	Poland	20	Linoy Geva (ISR)	Yana Reznikova (RUS)	Héloïse Macquaert (FRA)	
N/A	2020	Brazil	CANCELLED DUE TO COVID				
Techno 293+	2021	Oman	17	Manon Pianazza (FRA)	Kristyna Chalupnikova (CZE)	Zoe Fernandez De Bobadilla Ramos (ESP)	
iQFoil	2022	Netherlands	29	Tamar Steinberg (ISR)	Merve Vatan (TUR)	Lina Erzen (SLO)	
Techno 293+	2023	Brazil	21	Kristyna Pinosova (CZE)	Lina Erzen (SLO)	Darcey Shaw (GBR)	
iQFoil	2024	Italy	26	Carola Colasanto (ITA)	Darcey Shaw (GBR)	Sofia Hamalainen (FIN)	
iQFoil	2025	Portugal	25	Medea Marisa Falcioni (ITA)	Taisia Stopchenko (AIN)	Nurhayat Guven (TUR)	

== Kiteboarding ==
=== Kiteboarding – Male ===
Class	Year	Nations	No. Entries	Gold	Silver	Bronze	Ref.
Formula; Kite	2021	Oman	16	Maximilian Maeder (SGP)	Riccardo Pianosi (ITA)	Mikhail Novikov (RUS)	
Formula; Kite	2022	Netherlands	19	Maximilian Maeder (SGP)	Riccardo Pianosi (ITA)	Jakub Jurkowski (POL)	
Formula; Kite	2023	Brazil	19	Maximilian Maeder (SGP)	Qibin Huang (CHN)	Riccardo Pianosi (ITA)	
Formula; Kite	2024	Italy	14	Lucas Pes Fonseca (BRA)	Gian Andrea Stragiotti (SUI)	Nell de Jaham (FRA)	
Formula; Kite	2025	Portugal	18	Gian Andrea Stragiotti (SUI)	Toby Wigglesworth (NZL)	Nell de Jaham (FRA)	

=== Kiteboarding – Female ===
Class	Year	Nations	No. Entries	Gold	Silver	Bronze	Ref.
Formula; Kite	2021	Oman	10	Gal Zukerman (ISR)	Julia Damasiewicz (POL)	Héloïse Pégourié (FRA)	
Formula; Kite	2022	Netherlands	9	Julia Damasiewicz (POL)	Héloïse Pegourie (FRA)	Derin Atakan (TUR)	
Formula; Kite	2023	Brazil	10	Derin Atakan (TUR)	Catalina Turienzo (ARG)	Mika Kafri (ISR)	
Formula; Kite	2024	Italy	6	Maria Catalina Turienzo (ARG)	Meijing Xiao (CHN)	Derin Atakan (TUR)	
Formula; Kite	2025	Portugal	10	Suofeiya Li (CHN)	Emma Rennie (GBR)	Karolina Jankowska (POL)	
