= 2010 ISAF Youth Sailing World Championships =

Event title
- Edition: 40th

Event details
- Venue: Istanbul, Turkey
- Dates: 8 - 17 July 2011

The 2010 ISAF Youth Sailing World Championships took place in Istanbul, Turkey, from July 8 to 17, 2010. It was the 40th edition of the ISAF Youth Sailing World Championships.

== Competition format ==
=== Events and equipment ===
Event	Equipment
Men's dinghy (single hander)	Laser Radial
Men's dinghy (double hander)	420
Men's windsurfer	RS:X
Women's dinghy (single hander)	Laser Radial
Women's dinghy (double hander)	420
Women's windsurfer	RS:X
Open Skiff	29er
Open Multihull	SL 16

== Summary ==
=== Medal table ===
* Host nation (Turkey)

Rank	Nation	Gold	Silver	Bronze	Total
1	Spain	2	0	0	2
2	New Zealand	1	1	0	2
3	France	1	0	1	2
3	Switzerland	1	0	1	2
5	Netherlands	1	0	0	1
5	Poland	1	0	0	1
7	Denmark	0	1	0	1
7	Finland	0	1	0	1
7	Great Britain	0	1	0	1
7	Portugal	0	1	0	1
7	South Korea	0	1	0	1
7	Thailand	0	1	0	1
13	United States	0	0	3	3
14	Austria	0	0	1	1
14	Israel	0	0	1	1
14	Italy	0	0	1	1
Totals (16 entries)		7	7	8	22

=== Event medalists ===
==== Men's events ====
Event	First	Second	Third
Laser Radial	Thomas Saunders; New Zealand	Keerati Bualong; Thailand	Giovanni Coccoluto; Italy
420	Jordi Xammar; Joan Herp; Spain	Jao Villas Boas; Tomas Camelo; Portugal	Jeremy Bachelin; Alexandre Massard; Switzerland
RS:X	Mateo Sanz; Spain	Cho Won-woo; South Korea	Pawel Tarnowski; France

==== Women's events ====
Event	First	Second	Third
Laser Radial	Michelle Broekhuizen; Netherlands	Heidi Tenkanen; Finland	Erika Reineke; United States
420	Linda Fahrni; Maja Siegenthaler; Switzerland	Maelenn Lemaitre; Aloise Retornaz; France	Lara Vadlau; Hannah Hanke; Austria
RS:X	Kamila Smektala; Poland	Isobel Hamilton; Great Britain	Ofir Halevy; Israel

==== Open events ====
Event	First	Second	Third
29er	Gael Jaffrezic; Julien Bloyet; France	Alex Maloney; Sam Bullock; New Zealand	Antoine Screve; James Moody; United States
SL 16	Chase Lurati; Paul Daranin; Australia	Daniel Bjornholt; Nicolaj Bjornholt; Denmark	Taylor Palmer; Maximiliano Agnese; United States
