= 2019 Youth Sailing World Championships =

Event title
- Edition: 49th

Event details
- Venue: Gdynia, Poland
- Dates: 13 - 20 July 2019

The 2019 ISAF Youth Sailing World Championships took place in Gdynia, Poland from July 13 to 20 2019. It was the 49th edition of the ISAF Youth Sailing World Championships.

== Competition format ==
=== Events and equipment ===
Event	Equipment
Men's dinghy (single hander)	Laser Radial
Men's dinghy (double hander)	420
Men's skiff	29er
Men's windsurfer	RS:X
Women's dinghy (single hander)	Laser Radial
Women's dinghy (double hander)	420
Women's skiff	29er
Women's windsurfer	RS:X
Mixed Multihull	Nacra 15

== Summary ==
=== Medal table ===
* Host nation (Poland)

Rank	Nation	Gold	Silver	Bronze	Total
1	United States	2	0	0	2
2	Italy	1	2	0	3
3	Australia	1	1	1	3
3	France	1	1	1	3
5	Israel	1	0	3	4
6	New Zealand	1	0	0	1
6	Norway	1	0	0	1
6	Turkey	1	0	0	1
9	Spain	0	2	0	2
10	Finland	0	1	0	1
10	Malta	0	1	0	1
10	Russia	0	1	0	1
13	Germany	0	0	2	2
14	Poland*	0	0	1	1
14	Sweden	0	0	1	1
Totals (15 entries)		9	9	9	27

=== Event medalists ===
==== Men's events ====
Event	First	Second	Third
Laser Radial	Yiğit Yalçın Çıtak; Turkey	Zac Littlewood; Australia	Tytus Butowski; Poland
420	Seb MenziesHermus; Blake McGlashan; New Zealand	Demetrio Sposato; Gabriele Centrone; Italy	Tal Sade; Noam Homri; Israel
29er	Mathias Berthet; Alexander Franks-Penty; Norway	Ville Korhonen; Edvard Bremer; Finland	Archie Cropley; Max Paul; Australia
RS:X	Fabien Pianazza; France	Nicolo Renna; Italy	Liam Segev; Israel

==== Women's events ====
Event	First	Second	Third
Laser Radial	Chiara Benini Floriani; Italy	Ana Moncada Sanchez; Spain	Shai Kakon; Israel
420	Madeline Hawkins; Yumi Yoshiyasu; United States	Neus Ballester; Andrea Perelló; Spain	Theresa Steinlein; Lina Plettner; Germany
29er	Berta Puig; Bella Casaretto; United States	Antonia Schultheis; Victoria Schultheis; Malta	Martina Carlsson; Amanda Ljunggren; Sweden
RS:X	Linoy Geva; Israel	Yana Reznikova; Russia	Heloise Macquaert; France

==== Mixed events ====
Event	First	Second	Third
Nacra 15	Will Cooley; Rebecca Hancock; Australia	Titouan Petard; Marion Declef; France	Silas Mühle; Levke Möller; Germany
