= 1996 IYRU Youth Sailing World Championships =

Event title
- Edition: 26th
- Host: New York Yacht Club

Event details
- Venue: Newport, Rhode Island, USA
- Dates: 8 - 18 July 1996

The 1996 IYRU Youth Sailing World Championships took place in Newport, Rhode Island, United States from the 8 to 18 July 1996. It was the 26th edition of the IYRU Youth Sailing World Championships.

== Competition format ==
=== Events and equipment ===
Event	Equipment
Men's dinghy (single hander)	Laser
Men's dinghy (double hander)	Laser II
Men's windsurfer	Minstral
Women's dinghy (single hander)	Laser Radial
Women's dinghy (double hander)	Laser II
Women's windsurfer	Minstral

== Summary ==
=== Medal table ===
* Host nation (United States)

Rank	Nation	Gold	Silver	Bronze	Total
1	Great Britain	1	1	1	3
2	Netherlands	1	1	0	2
2	New Zealand	1	1	0	2
2	Poland	1	1	0	2
5	France	1	0	1	2
6	United States*	1	0	0	1
7	Canada	0	1	1	2
8	Australia	0	1	0	1
9	Ireland	0	0	1	1
9	Portugal	0	0	1	1
9	South Africa	0	0	1	1
Totals (11 entries)		6	6	6	18

=== Event medalists ===
==== Men's events ====
Event	First	Second	Third
Laser	Simon Small; New Zealand	Matthew von Bibra; Australia	Filipe Silva; Portugal
Laser II	Mats Hellman; Dirk Jan Lucas; Netherlands	Chris Draper; Daniel Newman; Great Britain	Michael Bond; Michael Bassett; Canada
Minstral	Przemyslaw Miarczynski; Poland	Guido Willems; Netherlands	Julien Legrand; France

==== Women's events ====
Event	First	Second	Third
Laser Radial	Anika Leerssen; United States	Nicole Pellegrin; Canada	Robyn Jane Keen; South Africa
Laser II	Jessie Cuthbert; Sally Cuthbert; Great Britain	Joanne Knight; Linda Dickson; New Zealand	Laura Dillon; Ciara Peelo; Ireland
Minstral	Perinne Vancilve; France	Miroslawa Rymko; Poland	Helen Cartwright; Great Britain
