= 2000 ISAF Youth Sailing World Championships =

Event title
- Edition: 32nd

Event details
- Venue: Sydney, Australia
- Dates: 28 December 2000 - 6 January 2001

The 2000 ISAF Youth Sailing World Championships took place in Sydney, Australia from 28 December 2000 to 6 January 2001. It was the 30th edition of the ISAF Youth Sailing World Championships.

== Competition format ==
=== Events and equipment ===
Event	Equipment
Men's dinghy (single hander)	Laser
Men's skiff	420
Men's windsurfer	Minstral
Women's dinghy (single hander)	Byte CII
Women's skiff	420
Women's windsurfer	Minstral

== Summary ==
=== Medal table ===
* Host nation (Australia)

Rank	Nation	Gold	Silver	Bronze	Total
1	Australia*	1	2	1	4
2	Poland	1	1	0	2
3	Great Britain	1	0	0	1
3	Netherlands	1	0	0	1
3	Norway	1	0	0	1
3	Spain	1	0	0	1
7	France	0	1	3	4
8	Greece	0	1	0	1
8	New Zealand	0	1	0	1
10	Germany	0	0	1	1
10	Hong Kong	0	0	1	1
Totals (11 entries)		6	6	6	18

=== Event medalists ===
==== Men's events ====
Event	First	Second	Third
Laser	Ben Austin; Australia	Andrew Murdoch; New Zealand	Thomas Le Breton; France
420	Alberto Padron; Antonio Del Castillo; Spain	Panagiotis Kabouridis; Athanasios Siouzios; Greece	Gavin Fee; Tom Burger; Australia
Minstral	Joeri Van Dyk; Netherlands	Nicolas Guyader; France	King Yin Chan; Hong Kong

==== Women's events ====
Event	First	Second	Third
Byte CII	Siren Sundby; Norway	Katarzyna Brzoska; Poland	Hanne Jansch; Germany
420	Victoria Rawlinson; Emma Rawlinson; Great Britain	Melissa Bryant; Martha Leonard; Australia	Manuelle Adam; Virginie Adam; France
Minstral	Agata Brygola; Poland	Allison Shreeve; Australia	Jenny Le Bihan; France
