= 1995 IYRU Youth Sailing World Championships =

Event title
- Edition: 25th

Event details
- Venue: Hamilton, Bermuda
- Dates: 12 - 18 July 1995

The 1995 IYRU Youth Sailing World Championships took place in Hamilton, Bermuda from the 12 to 18 July 1995. It was the 25th edition of the IYRU Youth Sailing World Championships.

== Competition format ==
=== Events and equipment ===
| Event | Equipment |
|---|---|
| Men's dinghy (single hander) | Laser |
| Men's dinghy (double hander) | Laser II |
| Men's windsurfer | Mistral |
| Women's dinghy (single hander) | Laser Radial |
| Women's dinghy (double hander) | Laser II |
| Women's windsurfer | Mistral |

== Summary ==
=== Medal table ===
* Host nation (Bermuda)

| Rank | Nation | Gold | Silver | Bronze | Total |
|---|---|---|---|---|---|
| 1 | Great Britain | 3 | 0 | 0 | 3 |
| 2 | Germany | 1 | 1 | 1 | 3 |
| 3 | Israel | 1 | 0 | 1 | 2 |
| 4 | Australia | 1 | 0 | 0 | 1 |
| 5 | France | 0 | 1 | 0 | 1 |
| 5 | Greece | 0 | 1 | 0 | 1 |
| 5 | Netherlands | 0 | 1 | 0 | 1 |
| 5 | Poland | 0 | 1 | 0 | 1 |
| 5 | United States | 0 | 1 | 0 | 1 |
| 10 | Italy | 0 | 0 | 1 | 1 |
| 10 | New Zealand | 0 | 0 | 1 | 1 |
| 10 | Portugal | 0 | 0 | 1 | 1 |
| 10 | Switzerland | 0 | 0 | 1 | 1 |
| Totals (13 entries) | | 6 | 6 | 6 | 18 |

=== Event medalists ===
==== Men's events ====
| Event | First | Second | Third |
|---|---|---|---|
| Laser | Ben Ainslie; Great Britain | Philipp Buchert; Germany | Gustavo Lima; Portugal |
| Laser II | Nick Rogers; Pom Green; Great Britain | David James; PJ Buhler; United States | Etienne Huter; Pierre Huter; Switzerland |
| Mistral | Amir Levinson; Israel | Pawel Gordasiewicz; Poland | Jon-Paul Tobin; New Zealand |

==== Women's events ====
| Event | First | Second | Third |
|---|---|---|---|
| Laser Radial | Sarah Blanck; Australia | Efi Mantaraki; Greece | Petra Niemann; Germany |
| Laser II | Jessie Cuthbert; Sally Cuthbert; Great Britain | Barbara Snieders; Wynkhe Bodewes; Netherlands | Claudia Tosi; Frederica Meringolo; Italy |
| Mistral | Amelie Lux; Germany | Sandrine Nuvolone; France | Sivan Yosefh; Israel |
