= 2014 ISAF Youth Sailing World Championships =

Event title
- Edition: 44th

Event details
- Venue: Tavira, Portugal
- Dates: 12 - 19 July 2014

The 2014 ISAF Youth Sailing World Championships took place in Tavira, Portugal, from July 12 to 19, 2014 . It was the 44th edition of the ISAF Youth Sailing World Championships.

== Competition format ==
=== Events and equipment ===
Event	Equipment
Men's dinghy (single hander)	Laser Radial
Men's dinghy (double hander)	420
Men's windsurfer	RS:X
Women's dinghy (single hander)	Laser Radial
Women's dinghy (double hander)	420
Women's windsurfer	RS:X
Open Skiff	29er
Open Multihull	SL 16

== Summary ==
=== Medal table ===
* Host nation (Portugal)

Rank	Nation	Gold	Silver	Bronze	Total
1	Spain	3	1	0	4
2	France	2	0	0	2
3	Israel	1	1	0	2
3	Russia	1	1	0	2
5	Singapore	1	0	1	2
6	United States	0	2	0	2
7	China	0	1	0	1
7	Ireland	0	1	0	1
7	Malaysia	0	1	0	1
10	Poland	0	0	2	2
11	Brazil	0	0	1	1
11	Finland	0	0	1	1
11	Italy	0	0	1	1
11	Japan	0	0	1	1
11	New Zealand	0	0	1	1
Totals (15 entries)		8	8	8	24

=== Event medalists ===
==== Men's events ====
Event	First	Second	Third
Laser Radial	Joel Rodriguez Perez; Spain	Seafra Guilfoyle; Ireland	Ryan Lo; Singapore
420	Yia Jia Loh; Jonathan Yeo; Singapore	Mohammad Faizal Norizan; Ahmad Syukri Abdul Aziz; Malaysia	Ibuki Koizumi; Kotaro Matsuo; Japan
RS:X	Yael Paz; Israel	Mattia Camboni; Italy	Radoslaw Furmanski; Poland

==== Women's events ====
Event	First	Second	Third
Laser Radial	Martina Reino Cacho; Spain	Haddon Hughes; United States	Monika Mikkola; Finland
420	Silvia Mas Depares; Marta Davila Mateu; Spain	Yahel Wallach; Stav Brokman; Israel	Ewa Romaniuk; Katarzyna Goralska; Poland
RS:X	Stefaniya Elfutina; Russia	Shi Hongmei; China	Marta Maggetti; Italy

==== Open events ====
Event	First	Second	Third
29er	Brice Yrieix; Loic Fischer Guillou; France	Quinn Wilson; Riley Gibbs; United States	Markus Somerville; Isaac Mchardie; New Zealand
SL 16	Louis Flament; Charles Dorange; France	Jordi Booth Ferrando; Ruben Booth Ferrando; Spain	Kim Vidal; Antônio Lopes; Brazil
