= 2013 ISAF Youth Sailing World Championships =

Event title
- Edition: 43rd

Event details
- Venue: Limassol, Cyprus
- Dates: 13 - 20 July 2013

The 2013 ISAF Youth Sailing World Championships took place in Limassol, Cyprus, from July 13 to 20, 2013 . It was the 43rd edition of the ISAF Youth Sailing World Championships.

== Competition format ==
=== Events and equipment ===
| Event | Equipment |
|---|---|
| Men's dinghy (single hander) | Laser Radial |
| Men's dinghy (double hander) | 420 |
| Men's windsurfer | RS:X |
| Women's dinghy (single hander) | Laser Radial |
| Women's dinghy (double hander) | 420 |
| Women's windsurfer | RS:X |
| Open Skiff | 29er |
| Open Multihull | SL 16 |

== Summary ==
=== Medal table ===
* Host nation (Cyprus)

| Rank | Nation | Gold | Silver | Bronze | Total |
|---|---|---|---|---|---|
| 1 | Australia | 1 | 1 | 0 | 2 |
| 2 | Great Britain | 1 | 0 | 2 | 3 |
| 3 | Brazil | 1 | 0 | 0 | 1 |
| 3 | China | 1 | 0 | 0 | 1 |
| 3 | France | 1 | 0 | 0 | 1 |
| 3 | New Zealand | 1 | 0 | 0 | 1 |
| 3 | Norway | 1 | 0 | 0 | 1 |
| 3 | Puerto Rico | 1 | 0 | 0 | 1 |
| 9 | Italy | 0 | 2 | 0 | 2 |
| 10 | Poland | 0 | 1 | 1 | 2 |
| 11 | Chile | 0 | 1 | 0 | 1 |
| 11 | Spain | 0 | 1 | 0 | 1 |
| 11 | Sweden | 0 | 1 | 0 | 1 |
| 11 | Ukraine | 0 | 1 | 0 | 1 |
| 15 | Netherlands | 0 | 0 | 2 | 2 |
| 16 | Finland | 0 | 0 | 1 | 1 |
| 16 | Portugal | 0 | 0 | 1 | 1 |
| 16 | Switzerland | 0 | 0 | 1 | 1 |
| Totals (18 entries) | | 8 | 8 | 8 | 24 |

=== Event medalists ===
==== Men's events ====
| Event | First | Second | Third |
|---|---|---|---|
| Laser Radial | Juanky Perdomo; Puerto Rico | Joel Rodriguez; Spain | Sebastien Schneiter; Switzerland |
| 420 | Tiago Brito; Andrei Kneipp; Brazil | Matteo Pilati; Michele Cecchin; Italy | Diogo Pereira; Pedro Cruz; Portugal |
| RS:X | Kieran Martin; Great Britain | Tugaryev Oleksandr; Ukraine | Radoslaw Furmanski; Poland |

==== Women's events ====
| Event | First | Second | Third |
|---|---|---|---|
| Laser Radial | Line Flem Host; Norway | Agata Barwinska; Poland | Monika Mikkola; Finland |
| 420 | Carrie Smith; Ella Clark; Australia | Nadja Horwitz; Carmina Malsh; Chile | Ilaria Paternoster; Benedetta Di Salle; Great Britain |
| RS:X | Lu Yunxiu; China | Marta Maggetti; Italy | Sara Wennekes; Netherlands |

==== Open events ====
| Event | First | Second | Third |
|---|---|---|---|
| 29er | Lucas Rual; Emile Amoros; France | Ida Svensson; Rasmus Rosengren; Sweden | Markus Somerville; Jack Simpson; Netherlands |
| SL 16 | Isaac McHardie; Micah Wilkinson; New Zealand | Paul Darmanin; Lucy Copeland; Australia | James Henson; Olivier Greber; Great Britain |
