= 2009 ISAF Youth Sailing World Championships =

Event title
- Edition: 39th

Event details
- Venue: Búzios, Brazil
- Dates: 9 - 18 July 2009

The 2009 ISAF Youth Sailing World Championships took place in Búzios, Brazil, from July 9 to 18, 2009. It was the 39th edition of the ISAF Youth Sailing World Championships.

== Competition format ==
=== Events and equipment ===
Event	Equipment
Men's dinghy (single hander)	Laser Radial
Men's dinghy (double hander)	420
Men's windsurfer	RS:X
Women's dinghy (single hander)	Laser Radial
Women's dinghy (double hander)	420
Women's windsurfer	RS:X
Open Multihull	Hobie 16

== Summary ==
=== Medal table ===
* Host nation (Brazil)

Rank	Nation	Gold	Silver	Bronze	Total
1	France	1	2	2	5
2	Great Britain	1	1	0	2
3	Brazil*	1	0	1	2
3	Singapore	1	0	1	2
5	Australia	1	0	0	1
5	Hong Kong	1	0	0	1
5	New Zealand	1	0	0	1
8	Denmark	0	1	1	2
8	Italy	0	1	1	2
10	Argentina	0	1	0	1
10	Cyprus	0	1	0	1
12	Chile	0	0	1	1
Totals (12 entries)		7	7	7	21

=== Event medalists ===
==== Men's events ====
Event	First	Second	Third
Laser Radial	Sam Meech; New Zealand	Tomás Pellejero; Argentina	Pascal Timshel; Denmark
420	Philip Sparks; Ben Gratton; Great Britain	Bernard Gabriel Skoczek; Thibaut Soler; France	Benjamín Grez Ahrens; Carlos Vergara Infante; Chile
RS:X	Joseph Gueguen; France	Michalis Malekkides; Cyprus	Jorge Renato do Amaral Silva; Brazil

==== Women's events ====
Event	First	Second	Third
Laser Radial	Elizabeth Yin; Singapore	Anne-Marie Rindom; Denmark	Mathilde De Kerangat; France
420	Martine Soffiatti Grael; Kahena Kunze; Brazil	Camilla Marino; Claudia Soricelli; Italy	Griselda Khng; Cecilia Low; Singapore
RS:X	Hei Man Chan; Hong Kong	Isobel Hamilton; Great Britain	Leonore Bosch; France

==== Open events ====
Event	First	Second	Third
Hobie 16	Jason Waterhouse; Lisa Darmanin; Australia	Romain Bellet; Valentin Bellet; France	Francesco Porro; Luca Marsaglia; Italy
