= 2011 ISAF Youth Sailing World Championships =

Event title
- Edition: 41st

Event details
- Venue: Zadar, Croatia
- Dates: 8 - 16 July 2011

The 2011 ISAF Youth Sailing World Championships took place in Zadar, Croatia, from July 8 to 16, 2011. It was the 41st edition of the ISAF Youth Sailing World Championships.

== Competition format ==
=== Events and equipment ===
| Event | Equipment |
|---|---|
| Men's dinghy (single hander) | Laser Radial |
| Men's dinghy (double hander) | 420 |
| Men's windsurfer | RS:X |
| Women's dinghy (single hander) | Laser Radial |
| Women's dinghy (double hander) | 420 |
| Women's windsurfer | RS:X |
| Open Skiff | 29er |
| Open Multihull | SL 16 |

== Summary ==
=== Medal table ===
* Host nation (Canada)

| Rank | Nation | Gold | Silver | Bronze | Total |
|---|---|---|---|---|---|
| 1 | Spain | 2 | 1 | 0 | 3 |
| 2 | France | 1 | 0 | 2 | 3 |
| 3 | Italy | 1 | 0 | 1 | 2 |
| 4 | Austria | 1 | 0 | 0 | 1 |
| 4 | Brazil | 1 | 0 | 0 | 1 |
| 4 | Norway | 1 | 0 | 0 | 1 |
| 4 | South Korea | 1 | 0 | 0 | 1 |
| 8 | United States | 0 | 3 | 0 | 3 |
| 9 | Denmark | 0 | 1 | 0 | 1 |
| 9 | Japan | 0 | 1 | 0 | 1 |
| 9 | Slovenia | 0 | 1 | 0 | 1 |
| 9 | Thailand | 0 | 1 | 0 | 1 |
| 13 | Australia | 0 | 0 | 1 | 1 |
| 13 | Great Britain | 0 | 0 | 1 | 1 |
| 13 | Israel | 0 | 0 | 1 | 1 |
| 13 | Netherlands | 0 | 0 | 1 | 1 |
| 13 | U.S. Virgin Islands | 0 | 0 | 1 | 1 |
| Totals (17 entries) | | 8 | 8 | 8 | 24 |

=== Event medalists ===
==== Men's events ====
| Event | First | Second | Third |
|---|---|---|---|
| Laser Radial | Maxime Mazard; France | Žan-Luka Zelko; Slovenia | Giovanni Coccoluto; Italy |
| 420 | Jordi Xammar; Alex Claville; Spain | Daichi Mototsu; Yuki Hino; Japan | Angus Galloway; Alexander Gough; Australia |
| RS:X | Cho Won-woo; South Korea | Mateo Sanz; Spain | Louis Giard; France |

==== Women's events ====
| Event | First | Second | Third |
|---|---|---|---|
| Laser Radial | Tiril Bue; Norway | Erika Reineke; United States | Sandy Fauthoux; France |
| 420 | Lara Vadlau; Tanja Frank; Austria | Morgan Kiss; Christina Lewis; United States | Nikole Barnes; Agustina Barbuto; U.S. Virgin Islands |
| RS:X | Veronica Fanciulli; Italy | Siripon Kaewduang – Ngam; Thailand | Naomi Cohen; Israel |

==== Open events ====
| Event | First | Second | Third |
|---|---|---|---|
| 29er | Carlos Robles; Florian Trittel; Spain | Antoine Screve; Mac Agnese; United States | Max Deckers; Annette Duetz; Netherlands |
| SL 16 | Martin Lowy; Kim Andrade; Brazil | Nicolaj Bjornholt Christiansen; Daniel Bjornholt Christiansen; Denmark | Rupert White; Nikola Boniface; Great Britain |
