= 2006 ISAF Youth Sailing World Championships =

Event title
- Edition: 36th

Event details
- Venue: Weymouth and Portland, United Kingdom
- Dates: 13 - 21 July 2006

The 2006 ISAF Youth Sailing World Championships took place on the Isle of Portland, Unkited Kingdom, from 13 to 21 July at the Weymouth and Portland National Sailing Academy. It was the 36th edition of the ISAF Youth Sailing World Championships.

== Competition format ==
=== Events and equipment ===
Event	Equipment
Men's dinghy (single hander)	Laser
Men's dinghy (double hander)	420
Men's windsurfer	RS:X
Women's dinghy (single hander)	Laser Radial
Women's dinghy (double hander)	420
Women's windsurfer	RS:X
Open Multihull	Hobie 16

== Summary ==
=== Medal table ===
* Host nation (Great Britain)

Rank	Nation	Gold	Silver	Bronze	Total
1	Australia	1	1	0	2
1	Italy	1	1	0	2
3	Poland	1	0	1	2
4	Argentina	1	0	0	1
4	Canada	1	0	0	1
4	Croatia	1	0	0	1
4	Great Britain*	1	0	0	1
8	Brazil	0	1	1	2
9	Israel	0	1	0	1
9	Netherlands	0	1	0	1
9	Spain	0	1	0	1
9	Sweden	0	1	0	1
13	Denmark	0	0	2	2
14	France	0	0	1	1
14	Russia	0	0	1	1
14	Singapore	0	0	1	1
Totals (16 entries)		7	7	7	21

=== Event medalists ===
==== Men's events ====
Event	First	Second	Third
Laser	Luke Ramsay; Canada	Emil Cedergardd; Sweden	Igor Lisovenka; Russia
420	Sebastian Peri Brusa; Santiago Masseroni; Argentina	Sam Kivell; Max Taylor; Australia	Marcos Adler; Bruno Leal Faria; Brazil
RS:X	Lukasz Grodzicki; Poland	Fabian Heidegger; Italy	Pierre Le Coq; France

==== Women's events ====
Event	First	Second	Third
Laser Radial	Tina Mihelic; Croatia	Marit Bouwmeester; Netherlands	Maiken Foght Schutt; Denmark
420	Belinda Kerl; Chelsea Hall; Australia	Agueda Suria; Marta Martinez-Pons; Spain	Sarah Tan; Tze Ting; Singapore
RS:X	Laura Linares; Italy	Maayan Davidovich; Israel	Malgorzata Bialecka; Poland

==== Open events ====
Event	First	Second	Third
Hobie 16	Tom Phipps; Richard Glover; Great Britain	Bruno Vilela Frey; Ricieri Vidal Marchi; Brazil	Jenna Mai Hansen; Jonathan Bay; Denmark
