= 1985 IYRU Youth Sailing World Championships =

1985 ISAF Youth Sailing World Championships
Event title
- Edition: 15th

Event details
- Venue: St Moritz, Switzerland
- Dates: 21 - 31 July 1985

The 1985 IYRU Youth Sailing World Championships took place in St Moritz, Switzerland between 21 and 31 July 1985. It was the 15th edition of the IYRU Youth Sailing World Championships.

== Competition format ==
=== Events and equipment ===
Event	Equipment
Open dinghy (single hander)	Laser
Open dinghy (double hander)	420
Open windsurfer	Mistral

== Summary ==
=== Medal table ===
* Host nation (Switzerland)

Rank	Nation	Gold	Silver	Bronze	Total
1	Australia	1	1	0	2
1	Germany	1	1	0	2
3	Great Britain	1	0	0	1
4	Spain	0	1	0	1
5	Italy	0	0	1	1
5	Netherlands	0	0	1	1
5	Poland	0	0	1	1
Totals (7 entries)		3	3	3	9

=== Event medalists ===
==== Open events ====
Event	First	Second	Third
Laser	Andrew Beadsworth; Great Britain	Jan Henk Maas; Germany	Andreas Willim; Netherlands
420	Jens Olbrysch; Bernd Oster; Germany	Jordi Calafat; Carlos Torralba; Spain	Piotr Dolinski; Jaroslaw Goszczynski; Poland
Mistral	Keill Price; Australia	Christopher Lawrence; Australia	Paco Wirz; Italy

=== Laser Youth Open ===
Pos.	Sail No.		Nats	Total points	Net points	Race 1		Race 2		Race 3		Race 4		Race 5		Race 6		Race 7		Race 8		Race 9		Race 10	
Pos.	Sail No.		Nats	Total points	Net points	Place	Points	Place	Points	Place	Points	Place	Points	Place	Points	Place	Points	Place	Points	Place	Points	Place	Points	Place	Points
1	K 05	Andrew Beadsworth	United Kingdom	35.4	25.4	1	0	1	0	2	3	3	5.7	1	0	5	10	1	0	4	8	3	5.7	2	3
2	H 23	Jan Henk Maas	Netherlands	104.7	33.7	2	3	2	3	1	0	1	0	2	3	6	11.7	2	3	OCS	71	1	0	5	10
3	G 21	Andreas Willim	Germany	72.1	51.1	4	8	3	5.7	15	21	5	10	7	13	1	0	3	5.7	1	0	2	3	3	5.7
4	KZ 20	Craig Monk	New Zealand	91.4	75.4	7	13	10	16	3	5.7	2	3	6	11.7	9	15	4	8	2	3	4	8	4	8
5	GR 10	Jack Kiseoglou	Greece	103	83	5	10	8	14	4	8	4	8	14	20	2	3	7	13	5	10	11	17	1	0
6	KA 04	Richard Stanning	Australia	133.4	110.4	3	5.7	7	13	17	23	8	14	12	18	3	5.7	5	10	9	15	8	14	9	15
7	B	Bart Bomans	Belgium	160.7	133.7	10	16	9	15	13	19	7	13	21	27	7	13	6	11.7	8	14	10	16	10	16
8	Z 17	Jean-Philippe Ryter	Switzerland	222	151	9	15	4	8	11	17	11	17	13	19	DNC	71	8	14	7	13	21	27	15	21
9	F 02	Vincent Berger	France	239.7	168.7	8	14	(DSQ)	71	18	24	6	11.7	19	25	14	20	25	31	13	19	5	10	8	14
10	OE 11	Thomas Chromecek	Austria	257	186	16	22	13	19	10	16	12	18	26	32	19	25	14	20	OCS	71	15	21	7	13
11	S 15	Stefan Andersson	Sweden	265.4	194.4	12	18	6	11.7	12	18	29	35	5	10	4	8	(DSQ)	71	3	5.7	OCS	71	11	17
12	CI 24	John Van Batenburg Stafford	Cayman Islands	271.7	200.7	6	11.7	19	25	36	42	30	36	8	14	8	14	10	16	OCS	71	17	23	13	19
13	KC 06	William Adams	Canada	248.7	208.7	34	40	18	24	6	11.7	15	21	22	28	17	23	12	18	19	25	18	24	28	34
14	N 01	Jan Erik Boestroem	Norway	254	218	26	32	16	22	19	25	19	25	24	30	16	22	19	25	12	18	13	19	30	36
15	I 26	Alessandro Castelli	Italy	294.7	223.7	14	20	14	20	24	30	17	23	20	26	DNC	71	37	43	16	22	6	11.7	22	28
16	L 03	Airola Niiles	Finland	305	234	13	19	21	27	14	20	23	29	27	33	22	28	13	19	20	26	OCS	71	27	33
17	BL 07	Ralph Henning	Brazil	281	246	22	28	17	23	25	31	16	22	29	35	26	32	21	27	23	29	19	25	23	29
18	D	Hansen Folke	Denmark	321	250	17	23	12	18	9	15	10	16	33	39	RET	71	16	22	OCS	71	16	22	18	24
19	PZ 14	Donat Kujawinski	Poland	325.7	254.7	15	21	26	32	30	36	21	27	32	38	RET	71	18	24	6	11.7	24	30	29	35
20	US 13	Frank Mccarthy	United States	301	255	32	38	40	46	22	28	24	30	25	31	12	18	11	17	10	16	25	31	40	46
21	J 16	Kenji Kawabe	Japan	339	268	20	26	OCS	71	16	22	20	26	28	34	15	21	17	23	OCS	71	14	20	19	25
22	IS 12	Gal Klarfeld	Israel	342	271	24	30	20	26	(DSQ)	71	14	20	17	23	13	19	34	40	29	35	22	28	44	50
23	P 27	Jose Pina	Portugal	344	273	21	27	24	30	39	45	28	34	16	22	18	24	26	32	OCS	71	26	32	21	27
24	IR 08	Craig Thompson	Ireland	344.7	273.7	11	17	DNF	71	7	13	41	47	3	5.7	10	16	9	15	OCS	71	DNF	71	12	18
25	E 29	Cesar Torne	Spain	356	285	(DSQ)	71	11	17	20	26	18	24	10	16	39	45	27	33	OCS	71	9	15	32	38
26	A 22	Jose Arondo	Argentina	370.7	299.7	OCS	71	OCS	71	8	14	13	19	4	8	11	17	OCS	71	11	17	OCS	71	6	11.7
27	KK 09	Patrick Charles	Kenya	380	309	31	37	22	28	35	41	26	32	31	37	RET	71	22	28	15	21	42	48	31	37
28	PR 30	Pedro Rodriquez	Puerto Rico	382	311	27	33	(DSQ)	71	42	48	32	38	15	21	33	39	28	34	14	20	28	34	38	44

=== 420 Youth Open ===
Pos.	Sail No.	Nats	Total points	Net points	Race 1		Race 2		Race 3		Race 4		Race 5		Race 6		Race 7		Race 8		Race 9		Race 10	
Pos.	Sail No.	Nats	Total points	Net points	Place	Points	Place	Points	Place	Points	Place	Points	Place	Points	Place	Points	Place	Points	Place	Points	Place	Points	Place	Points

=== Mistral Youth Open ===
Pos.	Sail No.		Nats	Gender	Total points	Net points	Race 1		Race 2		Race 3		Race 4		Race 5		Race 6		Race 7		Race 8		Race 9		Race 10	
Pos.	Sail No.		Nats	Gender	Total points	Net points	Place	Points	Place	Points	Place	Points	Place	Points	Place	Points	Place	Points	Place	Points	Place	Points	Place	Points	Place	Points
1	KA 39	Keill Price	Australia		35.4	25.4	1	0	1	0	2	3	3	5.7	1	0	(5)	10	1	0	4	8	3	5.7	2	3
2	KA 55	Christopher Lawrence	Australia		104.7	33.7	2	3	2	3	1	0	1	0	2	3	6	11.7	2	3	OCS	71	1	0	5	10
3	I 65	Paco Wirz	Italy		72.1	51.1	4	8	3	5.7	(15)	21	5	10	7	13	1	0	3	5.7	1	0	2	3	3	5.7
4	K 42	Barry Edington	United Kingdom		91.4	75.4	7	13	(10)	16	3	5.7	2	3	6	11.7	9	15	4	8	2	3	4	8	4	8
5	B 60	Wouter Cottyn	Belgium		103	83	5	10	8	14	4	8	4	8	(14)	20	2	3	7	13	5	10	11	17	1	0
6	K 51	Michael Oxley	United Kingdom		133.4	110.4	3	5.7	7	13	(17)	23	8	14	12	18	3	5.7	5	10	9	15	8	14	9	15
7	H 61	Armand Stiens	Netherlands		160.7	133.7	10	16	9	15	13	19	7	13	(21)	27	7	13	6	11.7	8	14	10	16	10	16
8	PR 66	Shannon Mcgarth	Puerto Rico		222	151	9	15	4	8	11	17	11	17	13	19	(DNC)	71	8	14	7	13	21	27	15	21
9	KZ 35	Andrew Mitchell	New Zealand		239.7	168.7	8	14	(DSQ)	71	18	24	6	11.7	19	25	14	20	25	31	13	19	5	10	8	14
10	F 47	Franck Luneteau	France		257	186	16	22	13	19	10	16	12	18	26	32	19	25	14	20	(OCS)	71	15	21	7	13
11	S	Jonas Sampson	Sweden		265.4	194.4	12	18	6	11.7	12	18	29	35	5	10	4	8	(DSQ)	71	3	5.7	OCS	71	11	17
12	KC	Pierre Graveline	Canada		271.7	200.7	6	11.7	19	25	36	42	30	36	8	14	8	14	10	16	(OCS)	71	17	23	13	19
13	OE	Bernhard Hachleitner	Austria		248.7	208.7	(34)	40	18	24	6	11.7	15	21	22	28	17	23	12	18	19	25	18	24	28	34
14	US	Tom Ryan	United States		254	218	26	32	16	22	19	25	19	25	24	30	16	22	19	25	12	18	13	19	(30)	36
15	IR 64	Julian Anderson	Ireland		294.7	223.7	14	20	14	20	24	30	17	23	20	26	DNC	71	37	43	16	22	6	11.7	22	28
16	VI 31	Jay Knoepfel	British Virgin Islands		305	234	13	19	21	27	14	20	23	29	27	33	22	28	13	19	20	26	(OCS)	71	27	33
17	L 40	Pasi Kousmanen	Finland		281	246	22	28	17	23	25	31	16	22	(29)	35	26	32	21	27	23	29	19	25	23	29
18	S 37	Mats Wilsson	Sweden		321	250	17	23	12	18	9	15	10	16	33	39	RET	71	16	22	OCS	71	16	22	18	24
19	D 49	Kai Hoffman	Denmark		325.7	254.7	15	21	26	32	30	36	21	27	32	38	RET	71	18	24	6	11.7	24	30	29	35
20	CZ 56	Jan Spidlen	Czech Republic		301	255	32	38	(40)	46	22	28	24	30	25	31	12	18	11	17	10	16	25	31	40	46
21	GR 52	Nikolas Kaklamanakis	Greece		339	268	20	26	(OCS)	71	16	22	20	26	28	34	15	21	17	23	OCS	71	14	20	19	25
22	OE 28	Georg Kendler	Austria		342	271	24	30	20	26	(DSQ)	71	14	20	17	23	13	19	34	40	29	35	22	28	44	50
23	G 6	Heinrich Schoop	Germany		344	273	21	27	24	30	39	45	28	34	16	22	18	24	26	32	(OCS)	71	26	32	21	27
24	E	Jose Luis Ballester	Spain		344.7	273.7	11	17	DNF	71	7	13	41	47	3	5.7	10	16	9	15	OCS	71	DNF	71	12	18
25	F 55	Fred Six	France		356	285	(DSQ)	71	11	17	20	26	18	24	10	16	39	45	27	33	OCS	71	9	15	32	38
26	H 41	Evert Jan Postema	Netherlands		370.7	299.7	(OCS)	71	OCS	71	8	14	13	19	4	8	11	17	OCS	71	11	17	OCS	71	6	11.7
27	GR 58	Kostas Moutikia	Greece		380	309	31	37	22	28	35	41	26	32	31	37	RET	71	22	28	15	21	42	48	31	37
28	S 08	Johanna Soderstrom	Sweden		382	311	27	33	(DSQ)	71	42	48	32	38	15	21	33	39	28	34	14	20	28	34	38	44
29	IS 26	Gur Steinberg	Israel		382	311	(DSQ)	71	15	21	29	35	33	39	18	24	37	43	DSQ	71	21	27	23	29	16	22
30	B 07	Nathalie Hens	Belgium		385	314	18	24	28	34	40	46	38	44	(DSQ)	71	28	34	15	21	25	31	34	40	34	40
31	L 36	Sael Sohkanen	Finland		362	318	30	36	30	36	34	40	22	28	(38)	44	29	35	29	35	33	39	37	43	20	26
32	P 23	Mario Ratinho	Portugal		400	329	(OCS)	71	OCS	71	28	34	9	15	11	17	30	36	23	29	OCS	71	20	26	24	30
33	US 33	Mike O'Bryan	United States		403	332	19	25	43	49	26	32	49	55	23	29	21	27	40	46	OCS	71	40	46	17	23
34	KZ 25	Bruce Trotter	New Zealand		407	336	37	43	25	31	21	27	25	31	DNC	71	24	30	24	30	30	36	31	37	DNC	71
35	KC 57	Richard Bisson	Canada		410	339	25	31	29	35	38	44	44	50	(DSQ)	71	34	40	20	26	24	30	35	41	36	42
36	B 45	Harald Jasper	Belgium		415	344	(OCS)	71	23	29	33	39	36	42	30	36	23	29	RET	71	22	28	32	38	46	32
37	I 54	Jean Jacques Diana	Italy		423	352	(OCS)	71	5	10	5	10	DSQ	71	9	15	RET	71	OCS	71	DSQ	71	7	13	14	20
38	Z 63	Michael Kuhne	Switzerland		414	361	29	35	36	42	23	29	35	41	45	51	36	42	38	44	32	38	33	39	(47)	53
39	J 67	Sato Keisei	Japan		434	363	28	34	35	41	43	49	42	48	37	43	20	26	32	38	OCS	71	30	36	42	48
40	KK 24	Jeremy Becker	Kenya		443	372	39	45	34	40	31	37	YMP	39	44	50	RET	71	35	41	34	40	29	35	39	45
41	F 01	Valerie Soula	France		427	375	33	39	41	47	45	51	37	43	35	41	35	41	33	39	27	33	(46)	52	35	41
42	PR 59	Christopher Mcgrath	Puerto Rico		450	379	40	46	(OCS)	71	DSQ	71	31	37	34	40	DNC	71	36	42	17	23	12	18	25	31
43	IR 48	Bill Coas	Ireland		454	383	23	29	(DNF)	71	27	33	34	40	dnc	71	31	37	39	45	18	24	27	33	dnf	71
44	KZ 03	Barbara Kendall	New Zealand		451	399	36	42	39	45	(46)	52	43	49	39	45	41	47	31	37	31	37	44	50	41	47
45	K 09	Natasha Pym	United Kingdom		457	400	35	41	37	43	47	53	51	57	40	46	32	38	30	36	35	41	41	47	49	55
46	IS 68	Eran Inbar	Israel		476	405	42	48	27	33	37	43	39	45	36	42	DNC	71	OCS	71	36	42	36	42	33	39
47	D 34	Hans Elmer	Denmark		473	418	45	51	32	38	44	50	45	51	43	49	25	31	42	48	40	46	(49)	55	48	54
48	KA 06	Samantha Harley	Australia		486	430	44	50	38	44	48	54	(50)	56	41	47	38	44	44	50	37	43	43	49	43	49
49	Z 62	Maarten Bauriedl	Switzerland		490	433	48	54	33	39	41	47	46	52	48	54	43	49	41	47	28	34	(51)	57	51	57
50	D 13	Anne Smith	Denmark		520	449	38	44	31	37	(DSQ)	71	40	46	46	52	27	33	OCS	71	OCS	71	38	44	45	51
51	Z 14	Lorenza Lorenza	Switzerland		537	466	43	49	44	50	(DSQ)	71	47	53	42	48	44	50	45	51	DNF	71	45	51	37	43
52	KK 05	Sonja Behmel	Kenya		541	470	41	47	(DNF)	71	50	56	52	58	50	56	45	51	47	53	38	44	47	53	46	52
53	KC 16	Edithe Trepannier	Canada		551	480	46	52	(DNF)	71	51	57	53	59	49	55	40	46	46	52	39	45	52	58	50	56
54	G 10	Claudia Rannetshauser	Germany		559	488	47	53	42	48	(DSQ)	71	48	54	47	53	42	48	43	49	OCS	71	48	54	52	58
55	CI 21	David Edward Stuart Walker	Cayman Islands		571	500	50	56	(DNF)	71	49	55	54	60	51	57	46	52	50	56	41	47	50	56	55	61
56	CI 30	Nicholas Grant Munyard	Cayman Islands		561	500	51	57	45	51	52	58	(55)	61	52	58	47	53	49	55	42	48	54	60	54	60
57	KK 29	Eric Allard	Kenya		574	503	(OCS)	71	DNF	71	32	38	27	33	DNC	71	DNC	71	DNF	71	26	32	39	45	DNC	71
58	IR 12	Edel O'Halloran	Ireland		631	560	RET	71	DNF	71	54	60	57	63	DNF	71	DNC	71	51	57	43	49	53	59	53	59
59	PR 15	Anita Gonzalez	Puerto Rico		632	561	52	58	RET	71	DNF	71	DNC	71	53	59	DNC	71	52	58	44	50	55	61	56	62
60	US 11	Taoi Curreri	United States		656	585	49	55	DNC	71	53	59	56	62	DNC	71	DNC	71	48	54	OCS	71	RET	71	DNC	71
