= 2012 ISAF Youth Sailing World Championships =

Event title
- Edition: 42nd

Event details
- Venue: Dublin, Ireland
- Dates: 14 - 20 July 2012

The 2012 Four Star Pizza ISAF Youth Sailing World Championships took place in Dublin, Ireland, from July 14 to 20, 2012. It was the 42nd edition of the ISAF Youth Sailing World Championships.

== Competition format ==
=== Events and equipment ===
Event	Equipment
Men's dinghy (single hander)	Laser Radial
Men's dinghy (double hander)	420
Men's windsurfer	RS:X
Women's dinghy (single hander)	Laser Radial
Women's dinghy (double hander)	420
Women's windsurfer	RS:X
Open Skiff	29er
Open Multihull	SL 16

== Summary ==
=== Medal table ===
* Host nation (Canada)

Rank	Nation	Gold	Silver	Bronze	Total
1	Great Britain	2	0	1	3
2	Spain	2	0	0	2
3	Australia	1	2	0	3
4	Italy	1	1	2	4
5	South Korea	1	0	0	1
5	Sweden	1	0	0	1
7	France	0	2	1	3
8	Norway	0	1	1	2
9	Ireland*	0	1	0	1
9	Israel	0	1	0	1
11	Argentina	0	0	1	1
11	Brazil	0	0	1	1
11	Netherlands	0	0	1	1
Totals (13 entries)		8	8	8	24

=== Event medalists ===
==== Men's events ====
Event	First	Second	Third
Laser Radial	Mark Spearman; Australia	Finn Lynch; Ireland	Hermann Tomasgaard; Norway
420	David Charles; Alex Charles; Spain	Guillaume Pirouelle; Valentin Sipan; France	Pieter Goedhart; Lars Van Stekelenborg; Netherlands
RS:X	Cho Won-woo; South Korea	Mattia Camboni; Italy	Maxime Labat; France

==== Women's events ====
Event	First	Second	Third
Laser Radial	Julia Carlsson; Sweden	Line Flem Host; Norway	Cecilia Zorzi; Italy
420	Ilaria Paternoster; Benedetta Disalle; Italy	Carrie Smith; Ella Clark; Australia	Annabel Vose; Kirstie Urwin; Great Britain
RS:X	Saskia Sills; Great Britain	Naomi Cohen; Israel	Veronica Fanciulli; Italy

==== Open events ====
Event	First	Second	Third
29er	Carlos Robles; Florian Trittel; Spain	Lucas Rual; Thomas Biton; France	Klaus Lange; Mateo Majdalani; Argentina
SL 16	Rupert White; Tom Britz; Great Britain	Paul Darmanin; Lucy Copeland; Australia	Martin Manzoil Lowy; Kim Vidal; Brazil
