= 2024 Youth Sailing World Championships =

Event title
- Edition: 53rd

Event details
- Venue: Lake Garda, Italy
- Dates: 11 - 20 July 2024

The 2024 Youth Sailing World Championships took place on Lake Garda, Italy from 11 to 20 July. It was the 53rd edition of the Youth Sailing World Championships.

== Competition format ==
=== Events and equipment ===
Event	Equipment
Boy's dinghy (single hander)	ILCA 6
Boy's windsurfer	iQFOiL
Boy's kitesurfer	Formula Kite
Girl's dinghy (single hander)	ILCA 6
Girl's dinghy (double hander)	420
Girl's skiff	29er
Girl's windsurfer	iQFOiL
Girl's kitesurfer	Formula Kite
Male/Mixed dinghy (double hander) (Note: Male/mixed. Male pairings allowed, mixed parings allowed, female pairings not allowed)	420
Male/Mixed skiff (Note: Male/mixed. Male pairings allowed, mixed parings allowed, female pairings not allowed)	29er
Mixed Multihull	Nacra 15

== Summary ==
=== Medal table ===
* Host nation (Brazil)

Rank	Nation	Gold	Silver	Bronze	Total
1	Italy*	6	0	0	6
2	Poland	2	1	0	3
3	Greece	1	1	0	2
4	Argentina	1	0	0	1
4	Brazil	1	0	0	1
6	France	0	2	2	4
7	Great Britain	0	2	0	2
8	Finland	0	1	1	2
8	Spain	0	1	1	2
10	China	0	1	0	1
10	Netherlands	0	1	0	1
10	Switzerland	0	1	0	1
13	United States	0	0	3	3
14	Turkey	0	0	2	2
15	Belgium	0	0	1	1
15	Thailand	0	0	1	1
Totals (16 entries)		11	11	11	33

=== Event medalists ===
==== Men's events ====
Event	First	Second	Third
ILCA 6	Antonio Pascali; Italy	Hidde Schraffordt; Netherlands	Weka Bhanubandh; Thailand
iQFOiL	Federico Pilloni; Italy	Igor Lewinski; Poland	Makani Andrews; United States
Formula Kite	Lucas Pes Fonseca; Brazil	Gian-Andrea Stragiotti; Switzerland	Nell de Jaham; France

==== Women's events ====
Event	First	Second	Third
ILCA 6	Maria Vittoria Arseni; Italy	Hermionie Ghicas; Greece	Isabella Mendoza Cabezas; United States
420	Iakovina Kerkezou; Giannouli Danai; Greece	Nicola Jane Sadler; Sofía Cavavo; Spain	Zeynep Çaçur; Zeynep Ela Koy; Turkey
29er	Alicja Dampc; Alicja Tutkowska; Poland	Una Heinilä; Silja-Sophie Laukkanen; Finland	Annie Sitzmann; Molly Bonham; United States
iQFOiL	Carola Colasanto; Italy	Darcey Shaw; Great Britain	Sofia Hamalainen; Finland
Formula Kite	Catalina Turienzo; Argentina	Meijing Xiao; China	Derin Atakan; Turkey

==== Mixed events ====
Event	First	Second	Third
Nacra 15	Lorenzo Sirena; Alice Dessy; Italy	Côme Vic-Molinero; Fatima Tia; France	Hannelien Borghijs; Sander Borghijs; Belgium
420 (Note: Male/mixed. Male pairings allowed, mixed parings allowed, female pairings not allowed)	Lisa Vucetti; Vittorio Bonifacio; Italy	Colin Postel; Théo Henry; France	Miguel Padrón Ferrer; Luis Mesa Oliver; Spain
29er (Note: Male/mixed. Male pairings allowed, mixed parings allowed, female pairings not allowed)	Ewa Lewandowska; Krzysztof Królik; Poland	Finian Morris; Charlie Gran; Great Britain	Jocelyn le Goff; Jules Vidor; France
