= Dimitri Deruelle =

French yacht racer

Dimitri Deruelle (born 5 December 1971) is a French yacht racer who competed in the 1992 Summer Olympics and in the 2000 Summer Olympics.
