= Lisa Darmanin =

Lisa Darmanin may refer to:

- Lisa Darmanin (politician), Australian senator
- Lisa Darmanin (sailor), Australian Olympic sailor
