= Klaus Lange =

Klaus Lange may refer to:

- Klaus Lange (handballer)
- Klaus Lange (sailor)
