= Murray Jones =

Murray Jones may refer to:

- Murray Jones (footballer), English football forward, coach and manager
- Murray Jones (sailor), New Zealand sailor
- Murray Jones (rugby union), New Zealand rugby union player
