= Fernando León =

Fernando León may refer to:

- Fernando León Boissier, Spanish sailor
- Fernando León de Aranoa, Spanish screenwriter and film director
- Fernando León, 1st Marquis of the Muni, Spanish politician and diplomat
- Fernando León (footballer) (born 1993), Ecuadorian footballer
