= Max Taylor =

Maxwell or Max Taylor may refer to:

== People ==
- Maxwell D. Taylor (1901–1987), United States Army general and diplomat
- Max Taylor (psychologist), Irish/UK psychologist
- Max Taylor (musician), British singer-songwriter
- Max Taylor (footballer), English professional footballer
- Max Taylor (racing driver), American racing driver
- Max Taylor, evening news anchor from 1987 to 1988 on WTWC-TV

== Characters ==
- Max Taylor, a.k.a. Screech, a vigilante protagonist in Screech
- Max Taylor, one of the main figures in the list of Dinosaur King characters
- Max Taylor, a character played by Benny Young in 1994's Funny Man (film)
- Max Taylor, a character played by Edward Underdown in 1948's Brass Monkey (film)
- Maxwell Taylor, a character played by Bill Maher in Out of Time (1988 film)
