= Carlos Robles =

Carlos Robles may refer to:

- Carlos Robles Piquer (1925–2018), Spanish diplomat and politician
- Carlos Robles (Colombian footballer) (born 1992), Colombian football midfielder
- Carlos Robles (footballer, born 2000) (born 2000), Mexican football defender
- Charlie Robles (1943–2011), Puerto Rican singer and actor
