= Chris Dickson =

Chris Dickson may refer to:

- Chris Dickson (footballer) (born 1984), English-born Ghanaian international footballer
- Chris Dickson (sailor) (born 1961), New Zealand yacht racer

== See also ==
- Chris Dixon, American internet entrepreneur and investor
- Chris Dixon (American football) (born 1981), indoor football head coach
- Chris Dixon, known during the Rhodesian raid on Westlands Farm as ‘Green Leader’
