= Maxime Paul =

French yacht racer (born 1971)

Maxime Paul (born 26 March 1971 in Toulon) is a French yacht racer who competed in the 1992 Summer Olympics.
