= Amanda Miller =

Amanda Miller may refer to:

- Amanda Miller (cyclist), American professional road, MTB and cyclo-cross racer
- Amanda Miller (choreographer), Eurovision Young Dancers 2001 jurist
- Amanda Miller (ice dancer), juvenile ice dancer in the 2014 United States Figure Skating Championships
- Amanda C. Miller, former professional name of voice actress Bennett Abara
- Amanda and Jerad Miller, perpetrators of the 2014 Las Vegas shootings
