= James Peters =

James or Jim Peters may refer to:

- Jimmy Peters (rugby) (1879–1954), English rugby player
- Jack Peters (James Peters), English football player
- James L. Peters (1889–1952), American ornithologist
- Jim Peters (athlete) (1918–1999), English long-distance runner
- James A. Peters (1922–1972), American zoologist
- Jimmy Peters Sr. (1922–2006), Canadian ice hockey player
- Jim Peters (politician) (1937–2026), New Zealand educator and politician
- Jimmy Peters Jr. (born 1944), Canadian ice hockey player
- James Peters (sailor) (born 1992), British Olympic Sailor
