= Josh Junior =

New Zealand sailor (born 1989)

Josh Junior (born 22 December 1989) is a New Zealand Olympic and international sailor.

== Sailing career ==
During the 2015 ISAF Sailing World Cup, Junior finished second in the men's Finn event in Weymouth.

After beating out Andrew Murdoch to qualify, he represented New Zealand at the 2016 Summer Olympics in the Finn class, finishing seventh.

Junior joined Team New Zealand in 2016 and was part of the crew that won the 2017 America's Cup.

In December 2019, Junior finished 1st at the 2019 Finn Gold Cup at the Royal Brighton Yacht Club. In doing so, he was the first ever New Zealand sailor to win the event.

Junior joined the New Zealand SailGP Team for the 2021–22 SailGP championship.

Junior represented New Zealand at the 2020 Summer Olympics in the Finn class and placed fifth after out qualifying Andy Maloney for selection. Maloney was Junior's coach during the regatta.
