= Olle Johansson =

Olle Johansson may refer to

- Olle Johansson (swimmer) (1927–1994), Swedish swimmer and water polo player
- Olle Johansson (sailor) (born 1957), Swedish sailor

== See also ==
- Kent-Olle Johansson (born 1960), Swedish wrestler
