= Tiago Brito =

Tiago Brito may refer to:

- Tiago Brito (futsal) (born 1991), Portuguese futsal player
- Tiago Brito (footballer) (born 2004), Portuguese footballer

== See also ==
- Thiago Brito (born 1992), Brazilian footballer
