= Mikhail Novikov =

Mikhail Novikov may refer to:

- Mikhail Novikov (biathlon coach), coached Svetlana Sleptsova
- Mikhail Mikhailovich Novikov, rector of the Moscow State University from 1919 to 1920
