= Andrew Murdoch (sailor) =

New Zealand sailor (born 1982)

Andrew Murdoch (born 16 July 1982 in Kawakawa) is a New Zealand sailor. He competed at the 2008 and 2012 Summer Olympics in the Men's Laser class, finishing in 5th place at both events.

He attempted to qualify for the Finn class for the 2016 Summer Olympics, but missed out on selection to Josh Junior, who finished seventh.
