= Joan Herp =

Spanish sailor (born 1993)

Joan Herp Morell (Note: In this Spanish name, the first or paternal surname is Herp and the second or maternal family name is Morell.) (born 18 October 1993) is a Spanish sailor. He and Jordi Xammar placed 12th in the men's 470 event at the 2016 Summer Olympics.
