= Diogo Pereira =

Diogo Pereira may refer to:

- Diogo Pereira (volleyball) (born 1997), Portuguese volleyball player
- Diogo Pereira (Brazilian footballer) (born 1990), Brazilian footballer
- Diogo Pereira (Portuguese footballer) (born 1995), Portuguese footballer
- Diogo Fernandes Pereira, 16th-century Portuguese navigator
