= Linda Dickson =

New Zealand sailor

Personal information
- Born: 3 March 1979 (age 47)

Sport
- Country: New Zealand
- Sport: Sailing

Linda Dickson (born 3 March 1979) is a New Zealand sailor. She competed at the 2004 Summer Olympics in Athens, in the women's 470 class.
