= Jordi Xammar =

Spanish sailor

Personal information
- Full name: Jordi Xammar Hernández
- Nationality: Spain
- Born: 2 December 1993 (age 32) Barcelona, Spain

Sport

Sailing career
- Class: 470
- Club: Club Nàutic Garraf
Medal record
Men's sailing
Representing Spain
Olympic Games
Bronze medal – third place	2020 Tokyo	470
World Championships
Silver medal – second place	2019 Enoshima	470
Bronze medal – third place	2018 Aarhus	470
Bronze medal – third place	2021 Vilamoura	470
European Championships
Silver medal – second place	2019 Sanremo	470
Bronze medal – third place	2017 Monaco	470

Jordi Xammar Hernández (born 2 December 1993) is a Spanish sailor. Xammar and Nicolás Rodríguez won the bronze medal in the men's 470 event at the 2020 Summer Olympics. Previously, Xammar and Joan Herp placed 12th in the men's 470 event at the 2016 Summer Olympics.

He skippered the Spanish entry in the 2017 Youth America's Cup and also a wildcard entry in the 2017 Extreme Sailing Series.
