= Israel Sailing Association =

Governing body for sailing in Israel

Israel Sailing Association איגוד השייט בישראל ISA
- IOC nation: Israel (ISR)
- Sport: Sailing
- Official website: sailing.org.il

HISTORY
- Year of formation: 1950

AFFILIATIONS
- International federation: International Sailing Federation (ISAF)
- ISAF member since: 1960
- Continental association: EUROSAF
- National Olympic Committee: Olympic Committee of Israel

ELECTED
- President: Yehuda Maayan

SECRETARIAT
- Address: Tel Aviv
- Secretary General: Dorith Stierler
- Olympic team manager: Gur Steinberg

FINANCE
- Company status: Association

The Israel Sailing Association (also known as the Israel Yachting Association; איגוד השייט בישראל) is the national governing body for the sport of sailing in Israel, recognized by the International Sailing Federation. Former Olympian Yehuda Maayan became Chairman of the Israel Sailing Association in 1992. Former Olympian Eli Zuckerman is the Chairman of the Professional Committee of the Israel Sailing Association.
