= Yachting New Zealand =

Sports governing body in New Zealand

Yachting New Zealand YNZ
- IOC nation: New Zealand (NZL)
- Sport: Sailing
- Official website: www.yachtingnz.org.nz

HISTORY
- Year of formation: 1954

AFFILIATIONS
- International federation: International Sailing Federation (ISAF)
- ISAF members page: www.sailing.org/about/members/mnas/new-zealand.php
- Continental association: Oceania Sailing Federation (OSAF)
- National Olympic Committee: New Zealand Olympic Committee

ELECTED
- President: Jan Dawson (NZL)

SECRETARIAT
- Address: Auckland
- Chief Executive: David Abercrombie (NZL)
- Number of staff: Approx. 20

FINANCE
- Company status: Incorporated Company

Yachting New Zealand is recognised by World Sailing as the governing body for the sport of sailing in New Zealand. Yachting New Zealand also facilitates training in sailing in and around the country.

== History ==
The emigration of Robert Logan (Senior) with the skills he had learnt boatbuilding on the Clyde encouraged the adoption of frameless diagonally planked two and three-skinned yachts in New Zealand. When combined with the use of the locally grown kauri Agathis australis the resulting hulls were extraordinarily long-lived, being highly resistant to rot and damage.

Logan's firm and his son's Archibald Logan, Robert Logan (Junior) and John Logan's own separate boatbuilding firm of Logan Brothers together with the Bailey boatbuilding family were to dominant yacht building in New Zealand from 1880 to the 1930s.

== Clubs ==
See Category:Yacht clubs in New Zealand

== Notable sailors ==
See Category:New Zealand sailors

=== Olympic sailing ===
See Category:Olympic sailors for New Zealand

High-profile sailor include Olympian and America's Cup legend Russell Coutts.

=== Offshore sailing ===
See Category:New Zealand sailors (sport)

New Zealand teams have a history in the America's Cup and it was the strong showing of the 12 metre KZ7 nicknamed the "plastic fantastic" with a young team led by Chris Dickson that brought global recognition. Team New Zealand continued the tradition, both challenging for and winning the America's Cup.

Peter Blake and Grant Dalton both became famous through success in the Whitbread Round the World Race.

== Marine industry ==
The marine industry is strong; high-profile builders include Boat Speed International.

== Bibliography ==
- Elliot, Robin; Kidd, Harold; Pardon, David (1999). Southern Breeze - A History of Yachting in New Zealand (Hardback). Auckland: Penguin Books. ISBN 0-670-88650-5.
- Holmes, Noel (1971). Century of Sail - Official History of the Royal New Zealand Yacht Squadron (Hardback). Wellington: Whitcombe and Tombs. ISBN 0-7233-0305-3.
- Titchener, Paul (1978). Little Ships of New Zealand (Hardback). Wellington: A.H & A.W. Reed. ISBN 0-589-01068-9.
- Wilkins, Ivor (2010). Classic - The Revival of Classic Boating in New Zealand (Hardback). Auckland: Random House. ISBN 978-1-86962-162-9.
