= Polish Yachting Association =

Polish Yachting Association PYA
- IOC nation: Poland (POL)
- Sport: Sailing
- Official website: www.pya.org.pl

HISTORY
- Year of formation: 1924

DEMOGRAPHICS
- Number of affiliated Sailing clubs: Approx. 85

AFFILIATIONS
- International federation: International Sailing Federation (ISAF)
- Continental association: EUROSAF
- National Olympic Committee: Polish Olympic Committee

ELECTED
- President: Wieslaw Kaczmarek

SECRETARIAT
- Address: Ludwiki 4 Str; 01-226 Warszawa
- Secretary General: Zbigniew Stosio
- Number of staff: Approx. 10

FINANCE
- Company status: Association

Ensign of the PZŻ.

The Polish Yachting Association (Polish: Polski Związek Żeglarski) is the national governing body for the sport of sailing in Poland, recognised by the International Sailing Federation.

In 1969, along with Les Glénans - France, Yacht Club de Morges - Switzerland, Centro Velico Caprera - Italy, National Schools Sailing Association - UK, Centro Internacional de Navigacion de Arousa - Spain, Les Glénans co-founded the International Sailing Schools Association in London, sometimes stated as Paris.

== Notable sailors ==
See Category:Polish sailors

=== Olympic sailing ===
See Category:Olympic sailors of Poland

=== Offshore sailing ===
See Category:Polish sailors (sport)
