= 2023 Sailing World Championships – ILCA 7 =

ILCA 7 at the 2023 Sailing World Championships
- Venue: The Hague, the Netherlands
- Dates: 13–20 August
- Competitors: 138 from 66 nations

Medalists
gold medal	Matthew Wearn	Australia
silver medal	Michael Beckett	Great Britain
bronze medal	George Gautrey	New Zealand

The ILCA 7 competition at the 2023 Sailing World Championships was the men's dinghy event and was held in The Hague, the Netherlands, 13–20 August 2023. The entries were limited to 140 boats. The competitors participated in an opening series that was planned to 10 races, followed by a medal race. The medal race was planned for 20 August.

The competition served as a qualifying event for the 2024 Olympic sailing competition with 16 out of 43 national quota being distributed at the event.

== Summary ==
Jean-Baptiste Bernaz of France was the reigning world champion, having won the 2022 ILCA 7 World Championship in Puerto Vallarta, while Matthew Wearn of Australia had won the Paris 2024 Test Event the month before. In the Sailing World Cup, Michael Beckett of Great Britain had won the Trofeo Princesa Sofía, Elliot Hanson of Great Britain had won the Semaine Olympique Française, Duko Bos of the Netherlands had won the Allianz Regatta, and Alexandre Boite of France had won the Kiel Week.

On the first day, Tonči Stipanović of Croatia started the racing with two race wins, with Becket recording one race win and one third in the other fleet. After four days of competition, Beckett had raised to the top as overnight leader. By the end of the opening series, Wearn was in top having a 20-point lead to George Gautrey of New Zealand and further one to Beckett. Results from the medal race saw Wearn win the gold medal, while Beckett of Great Britain won the silver medal, his first ILCA 7 World Championship medal.

With the final results, national quotas were awarded Australia, Great Britain, New Zealand, Italy, Cyprus, the Netherlands, Spain, Norway, Germany, Peru, Belgium, Finland, Hungary, Croatia, Ireland and Portugal.

== Results ==
Results of individual races
Pos	Helmsman	Country	I	II	III	IV	V	VI	VII	VIII	IX	X	MR	Tot	Pts
Gold medal	Matthew Wearn	Australia	11	11	6	5	1	3	2	7	25	65^{†}	12	148	83
Silver medal	Michael Beckett	Great Britain	3	1	3	2	BFD 70^{†}	2	5	8	2	66	4	166	96
Bronze medal	George Gautrey	New Zealand	15	16	3	4	16	1	1	26	BFD 70^{†}	9	10	171	101
4	Jean-Baptiste Bernaz	France	5	6	2	31	2	29	11	5	37^{†}	20	2	150	113
5	Lorenzo Brando Chiavarini	Italy	BFD 70^{†}	32	8	4	21	4	36	1	7	6	6	195	125
6	Pavlos Kontides	Cyprus	4	2	19	1	5	35	24	3	BFD 70^{†}	21	14	198	128
7	Duko Bos	Netherlands	18	3	2	18	19	7	34^{†}	6	16	34	8	165	131
8	Joaquín Blanco	Spain	16	13	10	16	26	9	9	15	14	54^{†}	16	198	144
9	Hermann Tomasgaard	Norway	2	5	28	11	14	13	44^{†}	22	12	31	18	200	156
10	Elliot Hanson	Great Britain	17	22	7	6	44	18	3	10	BFD 70^{†}	19	DNC 22	238	168
11	Thomas Saunders	New Zealand	10	13	21	3	17	30	7	34^{†}	32	17	–	184	150
12	Philipp Buhl	Germany	3	17	6	1	4	36	49^{†}	40	6	39	–	201	152
13	Joel Rodríguez	Spain	7	4	32	24	28	31	16	11	47^{†}	2	–	202	155
14	Stefano Peschiera	Peru	4	18	25	BFD 70^{†}	23	20	28	14	10	13	–	225	155
15	William de Smet	Belgium	6	25	12	BFD 70^{†}	22	16	25	20	20	10	–	226	156
16	Nik Aaron Willim	Germany	15	20	5	32	11	23	45^{†}	45	1	12	–	209	164
17	Ethan McAullay	Australia	6	47	8	7	18	38	51^{†}	23	5	28	–	231	180
18	Kaarle Tapper	Finland	5	15	32	14	9	14	50^{†}	49	35	8	–	231	181
19	Jonatán Vadnai	Hungary	8	24	1	BFD 70^{†}	34	6	32	25	17	35	–	252	182
20	Luke Elliott	Australia	7	14	41	5	7	37	33	12	BFD 70^{†}	27	–	253	183
21	Tonči Stipanović	Croatia	1	1	27	BFD 70^{†}	29	32	17	24	18	36	–	255	185
22	Filip Jurišić	Croatia	32	8	20	7	24	8	55^{†}	27	40	23	–	244	189
23	Finn Lynch	Ireland	12	4	20	BFD 70^{†}	15	58	8	17	19	38	–	261	191
24	Eduardo Marques	Portugal	33	2	15	25	36	22	20	37	46^{†}	4	–	240	194
25	Juan Ignacio Maegli	Guatemala	34	29	26	9	58^{†}	27	4	30	28	15	–	260	202
26	Ryan Lo	Singapore	16	19	19	12	38	15	29	53^{†}	8	49	–	258	205
27	Daniel Whiteley	Great Britain	17	7	31	BFD 70^{†}	8	60	14	32	33	5	–	277	207
28	Nooa Laukkanen	Finland	41	21	12	27	42^{†}	25	13	39	4	33	–	257	215
29	Emil Bengtson	Sweden	26	9	15	3	BFD 70^{†}	19	18	BFD 70	26	30	–	286	216
30	Dimitri Peroni	Italy	27	12	38	13	BFD 70^{†}	10	27	4	43	45	–	289	219
31	Valtteri Uusitalo	Finland	18	3	13	20	27	26	10	BFD 70^{†}	49	59	–	295	225
32	Johan Lundgaard Schubert	Denmark	25	7	13	42	55^{†}	33	43	9	36	18	–	281	226
33	Milivoj Dukić	Montenegro	31	12	29	16	50	11	52^{†}	41	11	25	–	278	226
34	Zac Littlewood	Australia	13	36	50^{†}	27	39	5	19	43	3	41	–	276	226
35	Finnian Alexander	Australia	14	14	48	40	53^{†}	12	15	2	39	44	–	281	228
36	Sam Whaley	Great Britain	9	5	26	BFD 70^{†}	40	50	22	29	53	1	–	305	235
37	Vishnu Saravanan	India	29	10	4	48^{†}	20	44	39	31	44	22	–	291	243
38	Francisco Guaragna Rigonat	Argentina	13	33	9	BFD 70^{†}	25	42	21	47	9	52	–	321	251
39	Yiğit Yalçın Çıtak	Turkey	20	31	18	13	BFD 70^{†}	21	30	33	48	40	–	324	254
40	Arthit Mikhail Romanyk	Thailand	22	23	23	19	57^{†}	28	31	57	23	32	–	315	258
41	Žan Luka Zelko	Slovenia	11	36	24	6	13	45	46	36	45	57^{†}	–	319	262
42	Alexandre Kowalski	France	23	43	1	17	33	55	63^{†}	44	41	16	–	336	273
43	Facundo Olezza	Argentina	12	26	11	35	3	34	DNE 70	58	DNC 70^{†}	26	–	345	275
44	Ewan McMahon	Ireland	40	17	44	10	12	49	23	50^{†}	38	46	–	329	279
45	Thomas van Ofwegen	Netherlands	30	22	45	23	64^{†}	40	35	16	29	STP 43	–	347	283
46	Berkay Abay	Turkey	31	31	30	9	37	24	56	42	24	69^{†}	–	353	284
47	Alexandre Boite	France	9	18	4	28	61	64	68^{†}	65	42	7	–	366	298
48	Khairulnizam Afendy	Malaysia	41	57	7	2	47	62	60	13	15	67^{†}	–	371	304
49	Benjamin Vadnai	Hungary	27	49	17	23	32	39	42	52^{†}	27	50	–	358	306
50	Dimitrios Papadimitriou	Greece	53	16	30	19	30	53	26	35	56^{†}	47	–	365	309
51	Niels Broekhuizen	Netherlands	BFD 70^{†}	32	35	8	46	51	62	21	54	3	–	382	312
52	Enrique Arathoon	El Salvador	10	61^{†}	28	24	10	43	61	18	60	58	–	373	312
53	Luc Chevrier	Saint Lucia	21	28	40	11	BFD 70^{†}	17	64	19	50	64	–	384	314
54	Kazumasa Segawa	Japan	33	30	16	BFD 70^{†}	45	61	37	28	22	43	–	385	315
55	Pedro Fernández Gamboa	Puerto Rico	35	34	RET 70^{†}	14	41	63	12	60	34	29	–	392	322
56	Clemente Seguel	Chile	19	15	17	32	51	56	40	38	BFD 70^{†}	55	–	393	323
57	Viktor Teplý	Czech Republic	37	27	14	BFD 70^{†}	60	48	53	62	13	11	–	395	325
58	Nicholas Halliday	Hong Kong	8	30	40	BFD 70^{†}	56	54	6	46	30	56	–	396	326
59	Juan Pablo Cardozo	Argentina	BFD 70^{†}	6	43	10	35	46	65	56	21	48	–	400	330
60	Francisco Renna	Argentina	47	25	10	38	49	41	41	48	31	63^{†}	–	393	330
61	Luke Ruitenberg	Canada	20	9	25	39	31	47	58	51	55	68^{†}	–	403	335
62	Just van Aanholt	Aruba	39	11	33	20	63	67^{†}	38	63	57	14	–	405	338
63	Wilhelm Kark	Sweden	29	59^{†}	29	25	6	57	47	54	59	51	–	416	357
64	Ondřej Teplý	Czech Republic	19	35	22	38	59	65^{†}	54	61	52	24	–	429	364
65	Fillah Karim	Canada	14	20	41	33	62	59	48	59	BFD 70^{†}	37	–	443	373
66	Ryan Anderson	Canada	21	8	34	29	48	66	66	BFD 70^{†}	BFD 70	53	–	465	395
67	Theo Peyre	France	28	37	46	8	52	52	67^{†}	64	51	62	–	467	400
68	Sebastian Kempe	Bermuda	34	51	24	18	43	69^{†}	57	66	58	61	–	481	412
69	Philip Walkenbach	Germany	49	33	14	37	54	68^{†}	59	55	61	60	–	490	422
70	Bruno Gašpić	Croatia	22	29	35	56^{†}	4	2	2	6	2	14	–	172	116
71	Willem Wiersema	Netherlands	24	26	49^{†}	35	2	8	26	8	3	6	–	187	138
72	Bruno Fontes	Brazil	36	21	39^{†}	31	21	10	8	1	4	7	–	178	139
73	Justin Barth	Germany	35	49^{†}	36	29	12	4	5	22	11	13	–	216	167
74	Santiago Sampaio	Portugal	BFD 70^{†}	19	42	44	15	14	7	14	19	3	–	247	177
75	Gauthier Verhulst	Switzerland	30	38	53^{†}	26	17	29	18	4	8	8	–	231	178
76	Chapman Petersen	United States	43	48^{†}	16	30	13	31	4	17	13	30	–	245	197
77	Cui Yinsheng	China	36	47	33	15	26	1	BFD 70^{†}	2	27	25	–	282	212
78	Georgios Papadakos	Greece	23	53^{†}	39	37	53	24	6	7	25	4	–	271	218
79	Uffe Tomasgaard	Norway	40	44	23	21	30	13	17	48^{†}	7	23	–	266	218
80	Lourenço Mateus	Portugal	38	48	18	40	5	42	BFD 70^{†}	10	9	12	–	292	222
81	Nico Naujock	Germany	28	34	34	BFD 70^{†}	10	3	1	42	46	24	–	292	222
82	Agustín Vidal	Argentina	50	45	5	52^{†}	36	7	13	36	22	9	–	275	223
83	Cesare Barabino	Italy	48	55^{†}	51	22	3	32	19	31	6	11	–	278	223
84	Philipp Andreas Grochtmann	Brazil	55	58^{†}	21	43	6	11	12	38	26	20	–	290	232
85	Keld Stentoft	Denmark	42	42	31	46^{†}	27	5	21	18	33	15	–	280	234
86	Campbell Patton	Bermuda	26	52	11	54^{†}	29	22	28	41	21	5	–	289	235
87	Leo Boucher	United States	56^{†}	41	42	47	34	39	3	9	16	17	–	304	248
88	Paul Hameeteman	Netherlands	54	28	37	41	16	33	BFD 70^{†}	25	5	10	–	319	249
89	Luke Deegan	New Zealand	43	23	50^{†}	30	7	34	25	45	15	28	–	300	250
90	Matteo Paulon	Switzerland	46	61	38	BFD 70^{†}	22	26	14	33	10	1	–	321	251
91	Aleksi Tapper	Finland	24	58	61^{†}	21	9	21	42	16	29	36	–	317	256
92	Leo Barreto	Spain	44	41	59	55	1	25	BFD 70^{†}	5	1	32	–	333	263
93	Matias Dyck	Ecuador	BFD 70^{†}	24	58	45	19	18	30	23	23	35	–	345	275
94	Daniel Escudero	United States	59	54	9	BFD 70^{†}	39	15	BFD 70	12	20	2	–	350	280
95	Ludvig Lindqvist	Sweden	42	50^{†}	46	15	41	50	35	3	30	18	–	330	280
96	Anastasios Panagiotidis	Greece	37	10	55	50	20	19	11	11	DNC 70^{†}	DNC 70	–	353	283
97	Chen Huichao	China	47	37	44	28	11	9	23	19	DNC 70^{†}	DNC 70	–	358	288
98	Maor Ben Hrosh	Israel	32	35	57	51	8	12	BFD 70^{†}	15	48	31	–	359	289
99	Ilija Marković	Montenegro	63	UFD 70^{†}	52	33	48	6	37	24	12	21	–	366	296
100	Guthrie Braun	United States	58^{†}	40	53	26	18	17	24	40	35	43	–	354	296
101	Caleb Armit	New Zealand	39	56^{†}	51	22	STP 36	35	43	37	28	19	–	366	310
102	Chusit Punjamala	Thailand	38	40	49	12	DNF 70^{†}	36	34	34	36	33	–	382	312
103	Vėjas Strelčiūnas	Lithuania	48^{†}	39	27	44	25	41	46	28	24	39	–	361	313
104	James Juhasz	Canada	25	46	64^{†}	48	23	56	33	21	40	26	–	382	318
105	Ricardo Seguel Lacamara	Chile	51	42	62	BFD 70^{†}	33	20	27	39	17	27	–	388	318
106	Luka Zabukovec	Slovenia	BFD 70^{†}	56	47	41	42	37	10	20	14	53	–	390	320
107	Kenji Nanri	Japan	49	60^{†}	54	51	31	45	9	29	18	38	–	384	324
108	Josep Cazador	Spain	44	44	UFD 70^{†}	47	14	DSQ 70	22	13	37	34	–	395	325
109	Mohit Saini	India	56^{†}	53	55	17	24	47	15	49	54	16	–	386	330
110	Renzo Sanguineti	Peru	45	46	43	36	37	38	BFD 70^{†}	26	34	41	–	416	346
111	Piotr Malinowski	Poland	50	DSQ 70^{†}	22	45	45	58	32	35	38	22	–	417	347
112	Antonios Bougiouris	Greece	45	52	37	34	46	44	16	27	DNC 70^{†}	DNC 70	–	441	371
113	Thad Lettsome	British Virgin Islands	46	54^{†}	45	39	38	30	36	43	51	49	–	431	377
114	Lee Wonn Kye	Singapore	57^{†}	39	57	53	49	23	38	53	41	29	–	439	382
115	Felipe Mallmann Fraquelli	Brazil	60	62^{†}	47	36	43	55	20	32	44	52	–	451	389
116	Clemens Kübber	Austria	55	60^{†}	36	43	40	43	47	52	39	37	–	452	392
117	Jeremy Moutout	Monaco	51	STP 28	56	RET 70^{†}	44	27	BFD 70	30	42	48	–	466	396
118	Eroni Leilua	Samoa	62	63^{†}	63	46	28	46	39	47	31	40	–	465	402
119	Radvilas Janulionis	Lithuania	DNF 70^{†}	55	60	49	32	16	44	59	43	44	–	472	402
120	Malcolm Benn Smith	Bermuda	59	51	52	42	50	59	31	60^{†}	47	42	–	493	433
121	Nikola Banjac	Serbia	52	57	58	34	52	54	BFD 70^{†}	56	32	47	–	512	442
122	Mārtiņš Atilla	Latvia	61	69^{†}	61	56	STP 59	28	29	44	55	55	–	517	448
123	Joshua Higgins	Bahamas	58	65^{†}	60	57	47	40	41	61	45	51	–	525	460
124	Huang Yang	Chinese Taipei	61	45	68^{†}	49	55	48	51	55	60	45	–	537	469
125	Jules Mitchell	Antigua and Barbuda	52	66^{†}	65	59	54	57	49	51	50	50	–	553	487
126	Mathieu Dale	U.S. Virgin Islands	57	62	65^{†}	50	56	61	45	50	52	54	–	552	487
127	Filipe Andre	Angola	65	50	67^{†}	52	51	52	53	63	53	60	–	566	499
128	Karl-Martin Rammo	Estonia	2	43	48	BFD 70^{†}	DNC 70	DNC 70	BFD 70	DNC 70	DNC 70	DNC 70	–	583	513
129	Alessio Spadoni	Italy	1	38	54	BFD 70^{†}	DNC 70	DNC 70	BFD 70	DNC 70	DNC 70	DNC 70	–	583	513
130	Pablo Bertran	Cayman Islands	62	67^{†}	63	55	62	53	50	54	61	56	–	583	516
131	Stefano Caiafa	Uruguay	66^{†}	66	56	53	57	62	40	64	56	62	–	582	516
132	Adil Elamrati	Morocco	54	64	69	54	65	51	57	DNF 70^{†}	49	58	–	591	521
133	Martin Aruja	Estonia	53	59	64	BFD 70^{†}	60	49	52	46	DNC 70	DNC 70	–	593	523
134	Gerardo Benitez	Mexico	60	63	59	59	STP 62	64^{†}	55	62	58	46	–	588	524
135	João Artur	Angola	67^{†}	64	62	58	59	60	54	58	59	57	–	598	531
136	Hamdi Slimani	Tunisia	64	65	67	58	BFD 70^{†}	63	48	57	62	61	–	615	545
137	Trent Hardwick	Belize	68^{†}	67	66	57	64	65	56	65	57	59	–	624	556
138	Peter Rajský	Slovakia	DSQ 70^{†}	68	66	60	63	66	58	66	63	63	–	643	573

Scoring system: low-point system; Source:
Legend: – Qualified for medal race(s); BFD – Black flag disqualification; DNC – Did not come to the starting area; DNE – Non excludable disqualification; DNF – Did not finish; DSQ – Disqualified; RET – Retired; STP – Standard penalty imposed; UFD – "U" flag disqualification; † – Discarded race not counted in the overall result;
