= 2017 Laser World Championship =

Sailing competition in Split, Croatia

Event title
- Edition: 38th

Event details
- Venue: Split, Croatia
- Dates: 12–19 September
- Titles: 1

Competitors
- Competitors: 147

Results
- (gold) Gold: (Cyprus) Pavlos Kontides
- (silver) Silver: (Australia) Tom Burton
- (bronze) Bronze: (Australia) Matthew Wearn

The 2017 Laser World Championship was held in Split, Croatia 12–19 September 2017. The world championship for the Laser class and organised by the International Laser Class Association and Jedrilicarski klub Mornar.

With no sailing possible on the last scheduled day of racing, the leader Pavlos Kontides of Cyprus was declared world champion of 2017.

== Results ==
=== Gold fleet ===
Results of individual races
Pos	Helmsman	Country	I	II	III	IV	V	VI	VII	VIII	IX	X	Pts
Gold medal	Pavlos Kontides	Cyprus	1	1	1	3	1	DNF	26	2	1	5	15
Silver medal	Tom Burton	Australia	18	2	6	7	1	1	5	4	4	23	30
Bronze medal	Matthew Wearn	Australia	9	3	1	1	2	2	11	24	5	6	31
4	Philipp Buhl	Germany	10	1	3	2	3	4	18	11	11	2	37
5	Jesper Stålheim	Sweden	10	4	5	4	6	5	7	UFD	3	11	45
6	Nick Thompson	Great Britain	3	5	8	3	1	DNF	20	1	13	14	48
7	Jean-Baptiste Bernaz	France	2	2	7	1	2	1	10	30	2	40	50
8	Thomas Saunders	New Zealand	15	3	7	2	4	3	23	5	8	19	51
9	Francesco Marrai	Italy	5	15	7	8	DNF	1	19	8	7	9	60
10	Lorenzo Brando Chiavarini	Great Britain	2	3	12	4	17	7	47	16	6	15	65
11	Elliot Hanson	Great Britain	2	10	1	8	4	7	43	27	16	4	69
12	Sam Meech	New Zealand	1	4	2	2	2	2	39	12	40	12	72
13	Christopher Barnard	United States	4	26	2	12	11	11	25	3	14	16	73
14	Luke Elliott	Australia	17	12	6	7	3	2	21	10	12	24	73
15	Charlie Buckingham	United States	32	6	4	12	14	21	15	7	9	8	75
16	Sergey Komissarov	Russia	1	6	3	5	8	8	12	18	31	33	84
17	Benjámin Vadnai	Hungary	7	18	25	11	7	13	8	15	10	13	84
18	Filip Jurišić	Croatia	15	12	5	7	9	DSQ	2	20	15	20	85
19	Karl-Martin Rammo	Estonia	22	8	10	14	10	6	13	23	26	10	94
20	Michael Beckett	Great Britain	5	7	6	17	20	8	28	34	24	1	96
21	Wannes Van Laer	Belgium	24	11	11	6	7	4	38	6	22	34	101
22	Mitchell Kennedy	Australia	4	7	13	9	6	4	1	46	36	37	104
23	Hermann Tomasgaard	Norway	10	9	9	9	3	13	3	37	37	26	106
24	Duko Bos	Netherlands	8	4	14	6	15	16	33	40	21	7	108
25	Jeremy O'Connell	Australia	8	22	5	20	11	10	16	17	45	22	109
26	Yuri Hummel	Netherlands	8	6	3	14	8	6	44	45	19	17	111
27	Kaarle Tapper	Finland	25	11	BFD	13	5	5	4	28	20	28	111
28	Stefano Peschiera	Peru	14	9	18	18	12	17	22	42	17	3	112
29	Tonči Stipanović	Croatia	17	1	4	1	10	12	14	22	DNF	DNS	114
30	Joel Rodríguez	Spain	16	7	13	5	17	32	17	25	43	18	118
31	Filip Ciszkiewicz	Poland	7	22	14	20	10	14	48	9	27	25	126
32	Finn Lynch	Ireland	36	12	16	3	9	11	36	19	UFD	21	127
33	Jack Wetherell	Great Britain	31	10	4	10	4	11	34	29	33	27	128
34	Žan Luka Zelko	Slovenia	9	8	28	15	5	3	35	39	25	29	129
35	Milivoj Dukić	Montenegro	3	16	10	UFD	7	18	40	14	30	38	136
36	Ryan Lo	Singapore	11	10	13	33	19	14	6	33	32	31	136
37	Jonatan Vadnai	Hungary	14	20	19	8	9	9	30	13	44	39	141
38	Giovanni Coccoluto	Italy	3	2	9	4	21	DNS	9	47	47	UFD	142
39	Marco Gallo	Italy	37	9	10	5	11	15	32	31	34	45	147
40	Ha Jee-min	South Korea	22	23	8	6	5	5	42	32	29	42	149
41	Jack Cookson	Great Britain	5	27	20	12	23	7	27	21	39	41	154
42	Enrique Arathoon	El Salvador	4	19	9	16	12	3	37	43	41	36	158
43	Joaquín Blanco	Spain	24	18	12	15	6	17	41	26	23	DNS	158
44	Antony Munos	France	12	44	22	14	15	10	49	44	18	30	165
45	Eliot Merceron	Switzerland	14	13	19	16	12	12	29	36	28	44	165
46	Viktor Teplý	Czech Republic	6	44	12	10	20	21	24	41	42	32	166
47	Juan Ignacio Maegli	Guatemala	19	14	11	11	13	17	31	35	38	DNS	170
48	Finnian Alexander	Australia	20	24	15	9	16	9	45	38	35	35	177
49	Malcolm Lamphere	United States	31	17	22	13	8	12	46	48	46	43	207

Legend: BFD – Black flag disqualification; DNC – Did not come to the starting area; DNF – Did not finish; DSQ – Disqualified; RDG – Redress given; UFD – "U" flag disqualification;

=== Silver fleet ===
Results of individual races
Pos	Helmsman	Country	I	II	III	IV	V	VI	VII	VIII	Pts
1	Robert Davis	Canada	23	14	21	18	16	16	4	2	91
2	Andrew McKenzie	New Zealand	46	5	2	11	13	DSQ	15	1	93
3	Theodor Bauer	Germany	7	25	17	23	14	28	9	5	100
4	Mustafa Çakir	Turkey	42	33	16	15	29	6	16	3	118
5	Loïc Queyroux	France	33	13	23	31	19	22	5	10	123
6	João Pedro Souto de Oliveira	Brazil	11	15	23	24	27	18	18	14	123
7	Zeno Gregorin	Italy	22	5	8	32	24	24	25	19	127
8	Juan Pablo Bisio	Argentina	27	22	25	21	18	23	7	11	127
9	Jesus Rogel Sanchez	Spain	12	16	33	27	40	20	6	15	129
10	Santiago Sampaio	Portugal	19	11	27	35	31	34	2	8	132
11	Tonko Kuzmanic	Croatia	13	17	14	18	24	29	22	25	133
12	George Gautrey	New Zealand	18	28	27	19	16	14	BFD	12	134
13	Niels Broekhuizen	Netherlands	20	14	26	16	17	18	BFD	24	135
14	Kazumasa Segawa	Japan	33	20	24	29	13	19	1	31	137
15	Kenji Nanri	Japan	36	31	36	20	14	10	3	23	137
16	Igor Les	Montenegro	37	32	21	19	21	13	24	7	137
17	Erik Bowers	United States	DSQ	8	19	BFD	20	9	11	20	137
18	Francisco Renna	Argentina	29	13	23	23	30	28	10	13	139
19	Henry Marshall	United States	28	30	17	10	35	28	8	22	143
20	Adonis Bougiouris	Greece	47	24	33	22	25	8	13	18	143
21	Karolis Janulionis	Lithuania	12	15	29	27	34	32	26	6	147
22	Maksim Nikolayev	Russia	16	38	18	24	21	24	BFD	9	150
23	Agustín Vidal	Argentina	32	21	20	24	28	22	19	17	151
24	Eduardo Marques	Portugal	34	BFD	11	17	15	23	BFD	4	154
25	Khairulnizam Afendy	Malaysia	21	23	17	27	19	19	DSQ	29	155
26	Tomas Pellejero	Argentina	25	17	15	17	22	DNF	28	34	158
27	Rui Silveira	Portugal	27	21	20	13	27	25	30	36	163
28	Daniel Whiteley	Great Britain	32	28	16	19	27	26	17	43	165
29	Liam Glynn	Ireland	39	21	37	25	25	26	21	21	176
30	Francisco Guaragna Rigonat	Argentina	28	27	24	22	24	20	33	DSQ	178
31	William De Smet	Belgium	26	23	31	30	23	20	38	27	180
32	Max Gallant	Canada	23	36	30	34	29	25	14	28	183
33	Sagie Glantz	Israel	15	38	26	30	29	22	35	26	183
34	Etienne Le Pen	France	13	20	26	30	28	39	BFD	30	186
35	Carlos Roselló	Spain	13	16	35	39	32	35	23	33	187
36	Tadeusz Kubiak	Poland	35	25	37	38	23	15	20	37	192
37	Yuichiro Kitamura	Japan	6	26	36	22	DNF	DNF	12	42	194
38	Ignacio Rodríguez	Uruguay	16	26	36	26	26	29	37	35	194
39	Maxime Mazard	France	35	36	18	UFD	18	23	BFD	16	196
40	Ford McCann	United States	39	25	15	21	32	33	34	bfd	199
41	Marshall McCann	United States	30	28	34	36	22	21	31	45	202
42	Luke Ruitenberg	Canada	17	34	29	37	36	30	27	39	210
43	Nicolo Villa	Italy	21	24	22	43	38	41	32	32	210
44	Andrey Quintero	Colombia	45	40	30	40	18	19	29	40	216
45	Nooa Laukkanen	Finland	44	19	25	28	34	30	BFD	38	218
46	Sam Whaley	Great Britain	33	33	33	32	22	16	BFD	DSQ	219
47	Justin Norton	Canada	41	40	21	28	30	27	36	44	223
48	Fillah Karim	Canada	25	19	41	29	33	36	BFD	41	224
49	Clemente Seguel	Chile	30	42	35	25	25	29	39	46	225

Legend: BFD – Black flag disqualification; DNC – Did not come to the starting area; DNF – Did not finish; DSQ – Disqualified; RDG – Redress given; UFD – "U" flag disqualification;

=== Bronze fleet ===
Results of individual races
Pos	Helmsman	Country	I	II	III	IV	V	VI	VII	VIII	Pts
1	Christian Guldberg Rost	Denmark	47	36	28	21	33	33	2	3	156
2	Martis Pajarskas	Lithuania	48	37	40	25	26	24	3	2	157
3	Berkay Abay	Turkey	31	32	31	35	26	30	6	12	168
4	Yanic Gentry	Mexico	39	30	38	26	31	25	8	11	169
5	Maximilian Müller	Germany	26	35	24	31	35	37	16	8	175
6	Hugh Macrae	Canada	34	39	32	35	31	34	4	10	180
7	Keerati Bualong	Thailand	23	43	32	32	40	38	14	4	183
8	Dominik Perkovic	Croatia	27	34	27	36	42	31	15	13	183
9	Daniel Self	Australia	38	31	34	28	28	27	BFD	1	187
10	James Stewart	Australia	36	45	35	UFD	36	31	1	5	189
11	Marek Zaleski	United States	40	46	32	23	34	26	5	30	190
12	Štěpán Novotný	Czech Republic	6	42	39	34	37	36	20	26	198
13	Aleksi Tapper	Finland	44	39	31	29	35	DNS	17	6	201
14	Santiago Diz	Uruguay	41	43	UFD	31	39	31	11	14	210
15	Mark Wong	Singapore	20	34	34	39	32	27	BFD	24	210
16	Patrick Døpping	Denmark	9	29	BFD	DNS	DNS	DNS	7	16	211
17	Wilhelm Kark	Sweden	44	40	UFD	26	44	44	9	7	214
18	Mario Novak	Croatia	43	32	44	37	37	33	23	9	214
19	Konstantinos Stamatiou-Merakli	Greece	24	48	38	41	41	43	10	18	215
20	Jack Aitken	Great Britain	34	29	38	41	42	36	18	20	216
21	Alec Cvinar	Croatia	49	41	42	33	36	37	12	21	222
22	Gabriel Sanz	Guatemala	11	41	40	33	37	37	BFD	25	224
23	Ao Higuchi	Japan	21	31	29	42	40	38	BFD	36	237
24	Daniil Krutskikh	Russia	29	30	41	34	41	DNS	13	DSQ	238
25	Andres Lage	Venezuela	49	44	43	38	33	15	31	35	239
26	Marcus Magnusson	Sweden	43	35	30	39	45	40	22	31	240
27	Kevin Wiersma	Canada	45	43	45	UFD	38	34	19	17	241
28	Arthur Baudet	Switzerland	18	45	43	40	44	39	28	32	244
29	Panagiotis Iordanou	Cyprus	40	39	41	DNF	38	35	32	19	244
30	Chusitt Punjamala	Thailand	43	27	39	43	43	40	29	23	244
31	Georg Haud	Estonia	41	29	43	42	43	35	27	27	244
32	Abdulla Janahi	Brunei	35	33	28	36	30	32	DNS	DNS	244
33	Jakub Halouzka	Czech Republic	38	18	42	38	43	41	26	42	245
34	Forrester Wachholz	Canada	30	37	42	DNS	DNS	DNS	24	15	248
35	Brendan Aulthouse	Canada	42	49	37	37	39	45	21	39	260
36	Upamanyu Dutta	India	29	41	40	45	41	40	30	DNS	266
37	Jaroupong Meeyusamsen	Thailand	26	46	44	44	44	43	34	33	268
38	Juan Ignacio Pérez	Mexico	28	35	44	47	49	45	35	37	271
39	Nikola Churkoski	North Macedonia	37	38	BFD	42	46	39	25	DSQ	277
40	Jiri Halouzka	Czech Republic	46	42	45	43	45	44	33	28	280
41	Cyrill Knecht	Switzerland	DNS	37	45	44	39	38	BFD	29	282
42	Hassan Al Tamimi	Qatar	47	45	39	45	46	42	BFD	22	286
43	Faris Al Bakri	Qatar	19	47	49	44	DNF	DNS	41	38	288
44	Ruslan Jangazov	Kazakhstan	42	47	48	41	42	42	37	41	292
45	Marin Mandic	Croatia	45	47	46	40	DNS	DNS	36	34	298
46	Patrik Meliš	Slovakia	38	48	46	DNS	45	41	40	bfd	308
47	Michal Andel	Slovakia	40	DSQ	46	48	48	47	38	43	310
48	Gabriele Besozzi	Italy	46	46	47	46	47	46	39	40	310
49	Austin Ross	Canada	48	50	DNF	DNS	DNS	DNS	DNS	DNS	348

Legend: BFD – Black flag disqualification; DNC – Did not come to the starting area; DNF – Did not finish; DSQ – Disqualified; RDG – Redress given; UFD – "U" flag disqualification;
