= 2011 ISAF Sailing World Championships – Laser =

Laser at the 2011 ISAF Sailing World Championships
- Venue: Perth, Western Australia
- Dates: 12–18 December
- Competitors: 147 from 65 nations

Medalists
gold medal	Tom Slingsby	Australia
silver medal	Nick Thompson	Great Britain
bronze medal	Andrew Murdoch	New Zealand

The Laser class at the 2011 ISAF Sailing World Championships was held in Perth, Western Australia between 12 and 18 December 2011.

== Results ==
Results of individual races
Pos	Helmsman	Country	I	II	III	IV	V	VI	VII	VIII	IX	X	MR	Tot	Pts
Gold medal	Tom Slingsby	Australia	1	6	1	1	1	9	1	5	10	13^{†}	2	50	37
Silver medal	Nick Thompson	Great Britain	3	6	8	2	5	8	9	1	31^{†}	10	4	87	56
Bronze medal	Andrew Murdoch	New Zealand	6	7	7	4	2	10	DNF 50^{†}	7	6	4	6	109	59
4	Simon Grotelüschen	Germany	7	1	7	4	6	1	10	11	2	23^{†}	14	86	63
5	Paul Goodison	Great Britain	5	8	4	1	6	1	2	23^{†}	21	11	10	92	69
6	Andreas Geritzer	Austria	1	14	3	14	1	4	5	28^{†}	5	6	18	99	71
7	Ashley Brunning	Australia	4	4	10	7	4	2	4	30^{†}	17	8	12	102	72
8	Johan Wigforss	Sweden	8	2	9	2	2	19^{†}	12	4	19	14	8	99	80
9	Tom Burton	Australia	16	11	1	20^{†}	3	4	3	15	9	12	20	114	94
10	Pavlos Kontides	Cyprus	9	1	21^{†}	1	2	14	21	2	12	18	16	117	96
11	Tonči Stipanović	Croatia	4	15	3	9	4	4	25	6	18	33^{†}	–	121	88
12	Jean-Baptiste Bernaz	France	2	7	2	10	10	2	28^{†}	12	28	19	–	120	92
13	Andy Maloney	New Zealand	17	5	2	13	39^{†}	13	14	3	11	20	–	137	98
14	Rob Crane	United States	19	13	23	15	8	20	8	45^{†}	1	2	–	154	109
15	Bruno Fontes	Brazil	8	2	18	3	7	18	24	24	30^{†}	5	–	139	109
16	Jesper Stålheim	Sweden	1	5	26	5	22	2	30	8	DNF 50^{†}	16	–	165	115
17	Mike Bullot	New Zealand	12	4	2	13	19	8	38^{†}	10	26	26	–	158	120
18	Julio Alsogaray	Argentina	9	12	20	2	16	6	15	32	40^{†}	9	–	161	121
19	Milan Vujasinović	Croatia	3	18	4	7	5	25	26	DNF 50^{†}	37	1	–	176	126
20	Ha Jee-min	South Korea	19	15	10	6	12	18	40^{†}	29	16	3	–	168	128
21	Chris Dold	Canada	20	3	3	17	3	16	33	20	15	38^{†}	–	168	130
22	Rasmus Myrgren	Sweden	3	9	7	5	10	15	32	27	33^{†}	24	–	165	132
23	Clayton Johnson	United States	8	5	25	6	8	6	13	43^{†}	41	21	–	176	133
24	David Wright	Canada	16	9	12	22	7	11	29	44^{†}	20	7	–	177	133
25	Karol Porozynski	Poland	5	2	13	5	13	39	44^{†}	21	14	22	–	178	134
26	Rutger van Schaardenburg	Netherlands	4	8	1	16	12	9	11	DSQ 50^{†}	43	31	–	185	135
27	Brad Funk	United States	6	33	5	9	23	1	RDG 24.3	34^{†}	22	17	–	174.3	140.3
28	Philipp Buhl	Germany	6	31	12	3	1	27	DNF 50^{†}	19	13	29	–	191	141
29	Evangelos Cheimonas	Greece	11	16	25	6	10	17	34	14	8	DNF 50^{†}	–	191	141
30	Charlie Buckingham	United States	5	4	36^{†}	25	11	23	27	18	3	30	–	182	146
31	Roelof Bouwmeester	Netherlands	2	9	15	21	17	5	OCS 50^{†}	13	24	41	–	197	147
32	Juan Ignacio Maegli	Guatemala	32	11	8	20	24	11	6	35^{†}	4	35	–	186	151
33	Daniel Mihelic	Croatia	14	14	11	8	BFD 50^{†}	19	19	9	38	25	–	207	157
34	Sam Meech	New Zealand	12	11	4	10	BFD 50^{†}	3	23	41	23	32	–	209	159
35	Kacper Ziemiński	Poland	2	26	16	11	13	23	20	25	27	44^{†}	–	207	163
36	Antonis Bougiouris	Greece	13	7	16	8	13	32	22	17	42^{†}	37	–	207	165
37	Josh Junior	New Zealand	7	3	5	31	33	7	42^{†}	40	7	42	–	217	175
38	Yuval Botzer	Israel	14	6	10	3	5	33	39	42^{†}	32	34	–	218	176
39	Zsombor Berecz	Hungary	7	25	15	19	4	10	18	46^{†}	35	46	–	225	179
40	Javier Hernandez	Spain	11	14	8	12	24	18	16	31	45^{†}	45	–	224	179
41	Matías del Solar	Chile	OCS 50^{†}	17	9	10	7	16	37	37	25	27	–	235	185
42	Karl-Martin Rammo	Estonia	13	16	17	7	9	41	31	22	29	43^{†}	–	228	185
43	Aron Lolic	Croatia	18	8	11	12	24	33	7	33	44	DNF 50^{†}	–	240	190
44	Emil Cedergårdh	Sweden	19	1	24	4	19	6	43	47	48^{†}	36	–	247	199
45	Marco Gallo	Italy	23	12	BFD 50^{†}	8	9	21	36	16	34	40	–	249	199
46	Ryan Palk	Australia	13	10	6	19	11	19	45	38	47^{†}	39	–	247	200
47	Argo Vooremaa	Estonia	35	29	6	28	9	8	41^{†}	26	36	28	–	246	205
48	Patryk Piasecki	Poland	10	10	BFD 50^{†}	32	6	13	46	39	39	15	–	260	210
48	Thorbjørn Schierup	Denmark	18	10	5	27	16	38	17	36	46	DNF 50^{†}	–	263	213
50	Alex Mills Barton	Great Britain	17	12	39^{†}	9	29	21	2	6	6	8	–	149	110
51	Guillaume Girod	Switzerland	36^{†}	26	13	30	18	9	14	3	20	2	–	171	135
52	Alejandro Foglia	Uruguay	12	34	11	11	23	27	3	1	41^{†}	22	–	185	144
53	Malte Kamrath	Germany	16	19	18	27	20	15	29^{†}	27	11	4	–	186	157
54	Douwe Broekens	Netherlands	OCS 50^{†}	19	24	23	23	22	4	21	21	1	–	208	158
55	Marcin Rudawski	Poland	29	13	36^{†}	24	17	7	32	2	18	18	–	196	160
56	Cy Thompson	U.S. Virgin Islands	26	26	23	38^{†}	27	29	1	23	4	6	–	203	165
57	Igor Lisovenko	Russia	34	20	17	42	14	5	45^{†}	4	15	16	–	212	167
58	Jared West	Australia	10	3	27	19	30	28	26	39^{†}	22	3	–	207	168
59	Matthew Wearn	Australia	22	21	14	41	20	13	5	17	23	BFD 50^{†}	–	226	176
60	James Burman	Australia	20	21	17	29	21	38^{†}	6	13	17	32	–	214	176
61	Christoph Bottoni	Switzerland	11	18	22	15	27	14	12	7	BFD 50^{†}	BFD 50	–	226	176
62	Wannes Van Laer	Belgium	22	17	28	15	28	48^{†}	21	25	14	7	–	225	177
63	Filip Matika	Croatia	34	41	20	16	8	10	27	44^{†}	10	11	–	221	177
64	Kristian Ruth	Norway	OCS 50^{†}	20	27	31	25	7	40	9	5	15	–	229	179
65	Jonasz Stelmaszyk	Poland	22	32	6	23	48^{†}	31	35	14	12	10	–	233	185
66	Lee Parkhill	Canada	25	30	13	13	BFD 50^{†}	36	39	29	1	9	–	245	195
67	Karlo Hmeljak	Slovenia	15	21	23	14	20	28	11	36	39^{†}	27	–	234	195
68	Scott Glen Sydney	Singapore	43^{†}	43	27	35	26	3	9	12	7	34	–	239	196
69	Sergey Komissarov	Russia	27	29	31	11	22	12	25	35	37^{†}	5	–	234	197
70	Fredrik Westman	Finland	36	15	9	24	30	26	44	5	BFD 50^{†}	12	–	251	201
71	Eduardo van Vianen	Netherlands	20	25	35^{†}	21	18	21	19	34	9	35	–	237	202
72	Francesco Marrai	Italy	17	27	19	33	21	36^{†}	7	31	25	23	–	239	203
73	Mustafa Çakır	Turkey	28	17	15	20	14	48^{†}	24	32	45	17	–	260	212
74	Maksim Semerkhanov	Russia	39	34	18	36	22	28	17	43^{†}	2	19	–	258	215
75	Shi Jian	China	32	33	21	34	16	12	13	42^{†}	33	21	–	257	215
76	Michele Regolo	Italy	32	16	26	18	BFD 50^{†}	5	38	30	27	30	–	272	222
77	David Jonsson	Sweden	15	41^{†}	14	22	32	35	18	26	19	41	–	263	222
78	Milivoj Dukić	Montenegro	15	30	29	33	12	16	48^{†}	8	44	39	–	274	226
79	Mattias Lindfors	Finland	9	28	24	36	37	24	46^{†}	22	26	20	–	272	226
80	Pierre Collura	Finland	43	23	32	25	15	39	8	28	DNC 50^{†}	14	–	277	227
81	Pablo Guitian	Spain	14	33	22	32	19	24	42	48^{†}	16	28	–	278	230
82	Thomas Saunders	New Zealand	26	35	12	DNF 50^{†}	15	30	DNF 50	11	3	BFD 50	–	282	232
83	Nicolas Schargorodsky	Argentina	27	24	19	17	BFD 50^{†}	42	31	19	31	25	–	285	235
84	James Espey	Ireland	18	22	BFD 50^{†}	37	3	20	20	33	36	BFD 50	–	289	239
85	Damien Desprat	Monaco	41	35	31	18	17	43^{†}	10	15	43	29	–	282	239
86	Eduardo Couto	Brazil	24	13	39	18	18	31	22	47	30	BFD 50^{†}	–	292	242
87	Nicholas Heiner	Netherlands	21	18	34	DSQ 50^{†}	11	23	16	20	DNC 50	DNC 50	–	293	243
88	Martin Evans	Great Britain	28	27	21	36	14	47^{†}	34	10	42	33	–	292	245
89	Frederick Vranizan	United States	26	28	28	30	BFD 50^{†}	25	37	41	8	24	–	297	247
90	Mathias Mollatt	Norway	23	36	16	37	37	3	28	40^{†}	32	38	–	290	250
91	Colin Cheng	Singapore	36	24	37	24	BFD 50^{†}	22	15	24	34	36	–	302	252
92	Saffet Onur Bilgen	Turkey	30	23	41^{†}	12	25	37	41	16	29	40	–	294	253
93	Oleksandr Isakov	Ukraine	31	24	20	16	39	40	33	38	13	43^{†}	–	297	254
94	Andrew Lewis	Trinidad and Tobago	21	45	BFD 50^{†}	14	40	17	36	45	24	13	–	305	255
95	Christian Steiger	Switzerland	10	36	33	21	31	42	23	DSQ 50^{†}	28	42	–	316	266
96	Mads Bendix	Denmark	21	30	31	29	34	35	43^{†}	18	35	37	–	313	270
97	Ricardo Montemayor	Mexico	43^{†}	23	35	23	35	25	30	37	40	26	–	317	274
98	Alexandr Denisiuc	Moldova	23	27	29	39	30	27	47^{†}	46	38	31	–	337	290
99	Dany Stanišić	Serbia	37	31	40	17	33	43^{†}	1	1	10	1	–	214	171
100	Alican Basegmez	Turkey	30	39^{†}	33	26	27	32	5	12	1	5	–	210	171
101	José Ruiz	Venezuela	31	40	14	32	29	46^{†}	4	4	8	19	–	227	181
102	Keerati Bualong	Thailand	38	39	30	33	49^{†}	17	6	16	5	20	–	253	204
103	Raul Aguayo	Dominican Republic	25	40	37	30	47^{†}	20	12	17	4	21	–	253	206
104	Nik Pletikos	Slovenia	37	37	25	35	43^{†}	33	11	21	9	2	–	253	210
105	Francisco Renna	Argentina	29	22	37	28	37	35	2	5	BFD 50^{†}	18	–	263	213
106	Rudy Lloyd McNeill	South Africa	40	28	29	31	44^{†}	34	15	26	6	6	–	259	215
107	Andrey Quintero	Colombia	27	22	26	40	OCS 50^{†}	30	3	18	2	DNF 50	–	268	218
108	Thomas Ramshaw	Canada	24	38	36	29	31	39	8	8	BFD 50^{†}	9	–	272	222
109	Matthew Reid	Great Britain	35	19	43	22	41	30	29	2	BFD 50^{†}	3	–	274	224
110	Shinnosuke Yasuda	Japan	34	36	22	43	BFD 50^{†}	34	20	14	14	10	–	277	227
111	Ian Hall	Japan	35	31	32	44^{†}	25	26	30	22	16	16	–	277	233
112	Rokas Milevičius	Lithuania	33	42	34	26	BFD 50^{†}	38	22	10	17	13	–	285	235
113	Ben Cornish	Great Britain	38	44	30	37	34	45^{†}	31	13	7	4	–	283	238
114	Ki Sułkowski	Australia	25	38	BFD 50^{†}	26	35	40	7	7	12	BFD 50	–	290	240
115	Rui Silveira	Portugal	40	37	DNF 50^{†}	40	36	15	13	6	BFD 50	7	–	294	244
116	Alexander Zimmermann Vega	Peru	24	25	41	39	28	40	19	15	BFD 50^{†}	14	–	295	245
117	Luka Domijan	Slovenia	31	32	34	44	28	29	10	19	20	BFD 50^{†}	–	297	247
118	Pablo Rabago	Mexico	33	40	45^{†}	43	33	24	21	25	3	27	–	294	249
119	Kota Jo	Japan	45^{†}	43	35	44	38	22	25	9	13	22	–	296	251
120	Viktor Teplý	Czech Republic	33	38	19	35	36	46	26	11	BFD 50^{†}	8	–	302	252
121	Tristan Brown	Australia	40	39	30	41^{†}	31	41	14	23	11	23	–	293	252
122	Rodney Govinden	Seychelles	42	43^{†}	38	34	40	14	32	29	19	17	–	308	265
123	Róbert Bakóczy	Hungary	42^{†}	32	33	41	29	37	17	30	23	26	–	310	268
124	Jesus Rogel	Spain	42	OCS 50^{†}	48	34	26	11	24	OCS 50	30	11	–	326	276
125	Teemu Rantanen	Finland	37	29	42	42	38	29	16	32	BFD 50^{†}	12	–	327	277
126	Enrique Arathoon	El Salvador	39	44	46	40	26	32	9	27	BFD 50^{†}	15	–	328	278
127	Emmanuel Sanchez	Monaco	38	41	41	39	45	12	34	3	BFD 50^{†}	30	–	333	283
128	Valeriy Kudryashov	Ukraine	30	35	38	28	15	49	27	24	BFD 50^{†}	DNF 50	–	346	296
129	Khairulnizam Afendy	Malaysia	29	37	47	25	32	26	33	OCS 50^{†}	DNF 50	24	–	353	303
130	Sebastian Buehler	Germany	39	34	32	38	21	31	18	OCS 50^{†}	BFD 50	DNF 50	–	363	313
131	Alex Louis Ramos Veeren	Brazil	41	45	40	42	43	34	37	28	15	DNF 50^{†}	–	375	325
132	Mohd Romzi Muhamad	Malaysia	46	47^{†}	28	45	32	44	35	42	25	32	–	376	329
133	Peter Taua Henry	Cook Islands	44	44	39	43	35	37	44	33	18	DNF 50^{†}	–	387	337
134	Lander Balcaen	Belgium	44	42	44	27	38	36	36	20	BFD 50^{†}	DNF 50	–	387	337
135	Mohammad al Shatouri	Egypt	44	47^{†}	45	46	34	45	28	41	24	31	–	385	338
136	Ard van Aanholt	Netherlands Antilles	41	42	38	46	OCS 50^{†}	44	23	31	BFD 50	25	–	390	340
137	Marek Horacek	Czech Republic	45	46	43	47^{†}	36	45	43	38	21	28	–	392	345
138	Valentin Nedyalkov	Bulgaria	47^{†}	46	44	45	39	47	39	34	27	29	–	397	350
139	Ramon Gonzalez	Puerto Rico	46	47	44	38	41	41	40	OCS 50^{†}	22	34	–	403	353
140	Gajender Singh	India	45	45	43	45	46^{†}	42	41	35	26	35	–	403	357
141	Ilia Ignatev	Kyrgyzstan	46	49^{†}	42	48	42	47	45	36	28	33	–	416	367
142	Grand Junior Charlie Poiri	Cook Islands	47	48^{†}	40	46	46	43	46	39	33	37	–	425	377
143	Gaurav Randhawa	India	49^{†}	49	42	47	44	46	47	40	31	38	–	433	384
144	Ruslan Jangazov	Kazakhstan	47	48	49	47	45	48	38	DNF 50^{†}	29	36	–	437	387
145	Ahmed Ragab	Egypt	48	48	45	DNF 50^{†}	42	44	42	37	32	DNF 50	–	438	388
146	Ivan Taritas	Croatia	28	20	BFD 50^{†}	DNC 50	OCS 50	DNF 50	DNC 50	DNC 50	DNC 50	DNC 50	–	448	398
147	Dennis van den Berg	Netherlands Antilles	48	46	DNC 50^{†}	DNC 50	DNC 50	DNS 50	DNS 50	DNC 50	DNC 50	DNC 50	–	494	444

Legend: – Qualified for medal race(s); BFD – Black flag disqualification; DNC – Did not come to the starting area; DNF – Did not finish; DNS – Did not start; DSQ – Disqualified; OCS – On the course side of the starting line; RDG – Redress given; † – Discarded race not counted in the overall result;
