= ILCA 7 World Championships =

Annual sailing world championship

The ILCA 7 World Championship, until 2020 the Laser World Championship, has been held every year since 1974, They are organized by the host club on behalf of the International Class Association and recognised by World Sailing. The class has been used in every Olympics since 1996 and has varied between being an "open" event meaning any gender or as currently a male only event so the World Championships also has a gender restriction.

== Editions ==
Event			Host			Sailor					Ref.
Ed.	Date	Year	Host club	City	Country	Gender			Nat.	Cont.	Ref.
1		1974			Bermuda	Open	108		24		
		1975	NOT HELD								
2		1976		Kiel	West Germany	Open	77		24		
3		1977		Cabo Frio	Brazil	Open	104		23		
		1978	NOT HELD								
4		1979		Perth	Australia	Open	93		25		
5		1980		Kingston	Canada	Open	350		25		
		1981	NOT HELD								
6		1982		Sardinia	Italy	Open	254		28		
7		1983		Gulfport	United States	Open	145		27		
		1984	NOT HELD								
8		1985		Halmstad	Sweden	Open	108		28		
		1986	NOT HELD								
9		1987		Melbourne	Australia	Open	130		20		
10	27 August – 2 Sept.	1988		Falmouth	United Kingdom	Open	88		24		
11		1989		Aarhus	Denmark	Open	104		28		
12		1990		Newport	United States	Open	103		26		
13		1991		Porto Carras	Greece	Open	105		31		
		1992	NOT HELD								
14	7–17 March	1993		Auckland	New Zealand	Open	99		29		
15		1994		Wakayama	Japan	Open	120		36		
16		1995		Tenerife	Spain	Open	137		39		
17	9–16 April	1996		Simon's Town	South Africa	Open	135		42		
18	13–22 October	1997		Algarrobo	Chile	Open	128		34		
19	3–13 March	1998		Dubai	United Arab Emirates	Open	130		59	6	
part of the 1998 ISAF World Sailing Games											
20	4–13 January	1999		Melbourne	Australia	Open	141		46		
21	13–22 March	2000		Cancún	Mexico	?	138		50	6	
22	30 July – 8 August	2001	Royal Cork Yacht Club	Crosshaven	Ireland	?	162		50	6	
23	9–11 September	2002	Hyannis Yacht Club	Hyannis, Massachusetts	United States	?	131		44	6	
24	11–24 September	2003		Cádiz	Spain	?	145		60	6	
part of the 2003 ISAF Sailing World Championships
25	10–19 May	2004		Bitez	Turkey	?	145		59	6	
26	18–28 September	2005	Iate Clube de Fortaleza	Fortaleza, Ceará	Brazil	?	136		38	6	
27	12–20 September	2006		Jeju	South Korea	?	128		39	6	
28	28 June – 13 July	2007	Clube Naval de Cascais	Cascais	Portugal	?	149		60	6	
part of the 2007 ISAF Sailing World Championships
29	5–13 February	2008 |	Gosford Sailing Club	Gosford	Australia	?	157		55	6	
30	17–26 August	2009	St. Margaret Sailing Club	Tantallon, Nova Scotia	Canada	?	163		48	5	
31	27 Aug. –5 Sep	2010	Hayling Island Sailing Club	Hayling Island, Hampshire	United Kingdom	?	159		53	6	
32	3–18 December	2011	Fremantle Sailing Club	Fremantle, Western Australia	Australia	?	147		65	6	
part of the 2011 ISAF Sailing World Championships
33	30Apr -10May	2012	Norddeutscher Regatta Verein	Uhlenhorst, Hamburg	Germany	?	168		62	6	
34	14–23 November	2013	Al Musannah Sports City	Al Musannah	Oman	Male	126		50	6	
35	8–21 Sept	2014		Santander	Spain	Male	147		69	6	
part of the 2014 ISAF Sailing World Championships
36	29 June – 8 July	2015	Canadian Olympic-training Regatta, Kingston	Portsmouth Olympic Harbour, Kingston, Ontario	Canada	Male	158	N/A	62	6	
37	10–18 May	2016	Vallarta Yacht Club	Nuevo Vallarta, Nayarit	Mexico	Male	112	N/A	44	6	
38	12-19 Sep	2017	Sailing Club Mornar	Split	Croatia	Male	147	N/A	52	5	
39	30Jul -12Aug	2018	Sailing Aarhus	Aarhus	Denmark	Male	165	N/A	66	6	
part of the 2018 Sailing World Championships
40	2–9 July	2019		Sakaiminato	Japan	Male	156	N/A	56	6	
41	9-16 Feb	2020	Sandringham Yacht Club	Sandringham, Victoria	Australia	Male	124	N/A	44	5	
42	3-10 Nov	2021	Barcelona International Sailing Centre	0	Spain	Male	135	N/A	43	5	
43	23–28 May	2022	Vallarta Yacht Club	Nuevo Vallarta, Nayarit	Mexico	Male	125	N/A	45	5	
44	13–20 August	2023		The Hague	Netherlands	Male	135	N/A	43	5	
part of the 2023 Sailing World Championships
46	26–31 January	2024	Adelaide Sailing Club	West Beach, Adelaide, SA	Australia	Male	152	N/A	52	5	
47	12–17 May	2025	Qingdao Olympic Sailing Centre	Qingdao, Fushan Bay, Shandong	China	Male	137	N/A	40	5	
48	25–30 August	2026	Royal St. George Yacht Club and National Yacht Club	Dún Laoghaire	Ireland	Male	141	N/A	45	5	
48	15-23 Jan	2027	Iate Clube de Fortaleza	Fortaleza, Ceará	Brazil						
49	29Jan -5Feb	2028	Takapuna Boating Club	Takapuna, Auckland	New Zealand						

== Multiple medallist ==
Updated up to and including the 2025 worlds and compiled from the medalists table below

#	Athlete	Gold	Silver	Bronze	Total	Entries
1	Robert Scheidt (BRA)	9	2	1	12	18
2	Tom Slingsby (AUS)	5	1	0	6	12
3	Glenn Bourke (AUS)	3	0	0	3	3
4	Matt Wearn (AUS)	2	3	1	6	13
5	Pavlos Kontides (CYP)	2	3	0	5	20
6	Nick Thompson (GBR)	2	2	2	6	16
7	Ben Ainslie (GBR)	2	0	3	5	5
8	John Bertrand (USA)	2	0	0	2	2

== Medalists ==
year	Gold	Silver	Bronze	References
1974 Hamilton	Peter Commette (USA)	Norman Freeman (USA)	Chris Boome (USA)	
1976 Kiel	John Bertrand (USA)	Barry Thom (NZL)	Ed Adams (USA)	
1977 Cabo Frío	John Bertrand (USA)	Peter Commette (USA)	Mark Neeleman (NED)	
1979 Perth	Lasse Hjortnæs (DEN)	Peter Conde (AUS)	Andrew Menkart (USA)	
1980 Kingston	Ed Baird (USA)	Jose Barcel Dias (BRA)	John Cutler (NZL)	
1982 Sardinia	Terry Neilson (CAN)	Andrew Roy (CAN)	Mark Brink (USA)	
1983 Gulfport	Oscar Paulich (NED)	Per Arne Nilson (NOR)	Asbjörn Arnkvaern (SWE)	
1985 Halmstad	Lawrence Crispin (GBR)	Andreas John (GER)	Benny Andersen (DEN)	
1987 Melbourne	Stuart Wallace (AUS)	Gunni Pedersen (DEN)	Peter Tanscheit (BRA)	
1988 Falmouth	Glenn Bourke (AUS)	Benny Andersen (DEN)	Peter Fox (NZL)	
1989 Aarhus	Glenn Bourke (AUS)	Wouter Duetz (NED)	Scott Ellis (AUS)	
1990 Newport	Glenn Bourke (AUS)	Steven Bourdow (USA)	Peter Tanscheit (BRA)	
1991 Porto Carras	Peter Tanscheit (BRA)	Stefan Warkalla (GER)	Mladen Makjanić (CRO)	
1993 Takapuna	Thomas Johanson (FIN)	Peter Tanscheit (BRA)	Robert Scheidt (BRA)	
1994 Wakayama	Nikolas Burfoot (NZL)	Pascal Lacoste (FRA)	Serge Kats (NED)	
1995 Tenerife	Robert Scheidt (BRA)	Nik Burfoot (NZL)	Eivind Melleby (NOR)	
1996 Simon's Town	Robert Scheidt (BRA)	Karl Suneson (SWE)	Ben Ainslie (GBR)	
1997 Algarrobo	Robert Scheidt (BRA)	Nik Burfoot (NZL)	Ben Ainslie (GBR)	
1998	Ben Ainslie (GBR)	Michael Blackburn (AUS)	Daniel Birgmark (SWE)	
1999	Ben Ainslie (GBR)	Robert Scheidt (BRA)	Karl Suneson (SWE)	
2000	Robert Scheidt (BRA)	Michael Blackburn (AUS)	Ben Ainslie (GBR)	
2001	Robert Scheidt (BRA)	Gustavo Lima (POR)	Peer Moberg (NOR)	
2002	Robert Scheidt (BRA)	Karl Suneson (SWE)	Paul Goodison (GBR)	
2003	Gustavo Lima (POR)	Robert Scheidt (BRA)	Michael Blackburn (AUS)	
2004	Robert Scheidt (BRA)	Mark Mendelblatt (USA)	Michael Blackburn (AUS)	
2005	Robert Scheidt (BRA)	Diego Romero (ITA)	Andrew Murdoch (NZL)	
2006	Michael Blackburn (AUS)	Tom Slingsby (AUS)	Rasmus Myrgren (SWE)	
2007	Tom Slingsby (AUS)	Andrew Murdoch (NZL)	Deniss Karpak (EST)	
2008	Tom Slingsby (AUS)	Julio Alsogaray (ARG)	Javier Hernández (ESP)	
2009	Paul Goodison (GBR)	Michael Bullot (NZL)	Nick Thompson (GBR)	
2010	Tom Slingsby (AUS)	Nick Thompson (GBR)	Andrew Murdoch (NZL)	
2011	Tom Slingsby (AUS)	Nick Thompson (GBR)	Andrew Murdoch (NZL)	
2012	Tom Slingsby (AUS)	Tonči Stipanović (CRO)	Andrew Murdoch (NZL)	
2013	Robert Scheidt (BRA)	Pavlos Kontides (CYP)	Philipp Buhl (GER)	
2014	Nicholas Heiner (NED)	Tom Burton (AUS)	Nick Thompson (GBR)	
2015	Nick Thompson (GBR)	Philipp Buhl (GER)	Tom Burton (AUS)	
2016	Nick Thompson (GBR)	Jean-Baptiste Bernaz (FRA)	Rutger van Schaardenburg (NED)	
2017	Pavlos Kontides (CYP)	Tom Burton (AUS)	Matthew Wearn (AUS)	
2018	Pavlos Kontides (CYP)	Matthew Wearn (AUS)	Philipp Buhl (GER)	
2019	Tom Burton (AUS)	Matthew Wearn (AUS)	George Gautrey (NZL)	
2020	Philipp Buhl (GER)	Matthew Wearn (AUS)	Tonči Stipanović (CRO)	
2021	Thomas Saunders (NZL)	Finn Lynch (IRL)	Tonči Stipanović (CRO)	
2022	Jean-Baptiste Bernaz (FRA)	Pavlos Kontides (CYP)	Filip Jurišić (CRO)	
2023	Matthew Wearn (AUS)	Michael Beckett (GBR)	George Gautrey (NZL)	
2024	Matthew Wearn (AUS)	Hermann Tomasgaard (NOR)	Michael Beckett (GBR)	
2025	Willem Wiersema (NED)	Pavlos Kontides (CYP)	Zac Littlewood (AUS)	
2026	Jonatán Vadnai (HUN)	Matthew Wearn (AUS)	Michael Beckett (GBR)	

== Other Related Events ==
- ILCA Main Worlds
  - Men's ILCA 6 World Championship
  - Women's ILCA 6 World Championship
  - Open ILCA 7 World Championship No Longer Held
  - Male ILCA 7 World Championship
- ILCA Age Related Worlds
  - Male Under 18 ILCA 4 World Championships
  - Female Under 18 ILCA 4 World Championships
  - Open Youth ILCA 6 World Championships No Longer Held
  - Male Youth ILCA 6 World Championships
  - Female Youth ILCA 6 World Championships
  - Female Under 21 ILCA 6 World Championships
  - Male Under 21 ILCA 7 World Championships
  - Open Over 30,45,55,65,75 ILCA Masters World Championships
- None Class Worlds
  - Youth Sailing World Championships
  - World Sailing Inclusion Championships
