= Yiğit Yalçın Çıtak =

Turkish sailor (born 2001)

Personal information
- Nationality: Turkish
- Born: 3 January 2001 (age 25) Bodrum, Muğla, Turkey
- Education: Bahçeşehir University

Sailing career
- Sport: Sailing
- Club: Fenerbahçe Sailing
- Class: Laser Radial
Medal record
Men's Sailing
Representing Turkey
Youth World Championships
Gold medal – first place	2019 Gdynia	ILCA 6

Yiğit Yalçın Çıtak (born 3 January 2001) is a Turkish Olympic sailor who specializes in the Laser Radial class. He is a member of the Fenerbahçe Sailing.

== Sport career ==
Çitak is a member of Fenerbahçe Sailing.

=== 2019 ===
Çıtak captured the gold medal in the Laser Radial (ILCA 6) class at the 2019 Youth Sailing World Championships held in Gdynia, Poland.

==== Laser Radial Boys Youth Sailing World Championships medallists ====
Year	Gold	Silver	Bronze
2010 Istanbul	Thomas Saunders (NZL)	Keerati Bualong (MAS)	Giovanni Coccoluto (ITA)
2011 Zadar	Maxime Mazard (FRA)	San-Luka Zelko (SLO)	Giovanni Coccoluto (ITA)
2012 Dublin	Mark Spearman (AUS)	Finn Lynch (IRL)	Hermann Tomasgaard (NOR)
2013 Limassol	Juanky Perdomo (PUR)	Joel Rodríguez (ESP)	Sébastien Schneiter (SUI)
2014 Tavira	Joel Rodríguez (ESP)	Seafra Guilfoyle (IRL)	Ryan Lo (SIN)
2015 Langkawi	Alistair Young (AUS)	George Gautrey (NZL)	Daniel Whiteley (GBR)
2016 Auckland	Finnian Alexander (AUS)	Paolo Giargia (ITA)	Carrson Pearce (USA)
2017 Sanya	Maor Ben Hrosh (ISR)	Daniil Krutskikh (RUS)	Guido Gallinaro (ITA)
2018 Corpus Christi	Josh Armit (NZL)	Juan Cardozo (ARG)	Zac Littlewood (AUS)
2019 Gdynia	Yiğit Yalçın Çıtak (TUR)	Zac Littlewood (AUS)	Tytus Butowski (POL)
2021 Al-Mussanah	Sebastian Kempe (BER)	Luka Zabukovec (SLO)	José Saraiva (POR)
2022 The Hague	Rocco Wright (IRE)	Sebastian Kempe (BER)	Ole Schweckendiek (GER)
2023 Búzios	Mattia Cesana (ITA)	Luka Zabukovec (SLO)	João Pontes (POR)
2024 Lake Garda	Antonio Pascali (ITA)	Hidde Schraffordt (NED)	Weka Bhanubandh (THA)
2025 Vilamoura	David Coates (USA)	Jiří Tomeš (CZE)	Emilios Boeros (CYP)

=== 2022 ===
He participated in the Laser class at the 2022 Mediterranean Games in Oran, Algeria, and finished 14th.

=== 2024 ===
Çitak competed in the Gold Group of the 2024 ILCA 7 World Championship in Adelaide, Australia, and placed 28th among 51 participants. This result qualified him to represent Turkey at the 2024 Summer Olympics in Paris, France. He competed in the Laser Standard (ILCA 7) class, finishing 23rd.

== Personal life ==
Çıtak was born on 3 January 2001.

He completed his secondary education with high marks at the TED Bodum College. He is currently studying Engineering management at Bahçeşehir University in Istanbul.
