= 2017 Youth Sailing World Championships – Boy's Laser Radial =

Men's Laser Radial at the 2017 Youth Sailing World Championships
- Venue: Sanya, China
- Dates: 9–16 December
- Competitors: 51 from 51 nations

Medalists
gold medal	Maor Ben Hrosh	Israel
silver medal	Daniil Krutskikh	Russia
bronze medal	Guido Gallinaro	Italy

The boy's Laser Radial competition at the 2017 Youth Sailing World Championships took place between 9 and 16 December. 51 sailors from 51 nations were due to compete. Israeli Maor Ben Hrosh won the event.

== Results ==
Pos	Helm	Country	R1	R2	R3	R4	R5	R6	R7	R8	R9	Total	Nett
1	Maor Ben Hrosh	Israel	(27.0)	2.0	3.0	21.0	15.0	2.0	5.0	2.0	4.0	81.0	54.0
2	Daniil Krutskikh	Russia	3.0	12.0	6.0	4.0	4.0	11.0	1.0	16.0	(19.0)	76.0	57.0
3	Guido Gallinaro	Italy	2.0	7.0	21.0	1.0	12.0	8.0	(52.0 DSQ)	7.0	2.0	112.0	60.0
4	Calvin Gibbs	South Africa	5.0	(22.0)	5.0	6.0	8.0	12.0	4.0	19.0	1.0	82.0	60.0
5	Josh Armit	New Zealand	1.0	14.0	1.0	14.0	(20.0)	4.0	13.0	10.0	8.0	85.0	65.0
6	Dimitris Papadimitriou	Greece	17.0	13.0	22.0	2.0	3.0	(27.0)	14.0	1.0	5.0	104.0	77.0
7	Tiago Quevedo	Brazil	4.0	14.0	22.0	1.0	17.0	2.0	(25.0)	7.0	106.0	81.0	
8	Joseph Hou	United States	13.0	5.0	2.0	10.0	(28.0)	18.0	16.0	12.0	17.0	121.0	93.0
9	Caelin Winchcombe	Australia	(52.0 DSQ)	3.0	19.0	20.0	6.0	1.0	28.0	17.0	9.0	155.0	103.0
10	Dominik Perkovic	Croatia	6.0	19.0	8.0	25.0	(33.0)	14.0	17.0	8.0	10.0	140.0	107.0
11	Gregoire Peverelli	Switzerland	21.0	17.0	13.0	9.0	17.0	6.0	20.0	(23.0)	6.0	132.0	109.0
12	Léo Maurin	France	7.0	(34.0)	16.0	30.0	2.0	21.0	6.0	29.0	16.0	161.0	127.0
13	Clemente Seguel	Chile	26.0	20.0	(27.0)	3.0	19.0	3.0	25.0	6.0	26.0	155.0	128.0
14th	Lourenco Mateus	Portugal	11.0	30.0	9.0	(35.0)	11.0	25.0	24.0	11.0	15.0	171.0	136.0
15th	Matias Dietrich	Argentina	25.0	9.0	18.0	5.0	5.0	41.0	29.0	9.0	(52.0 DNF)	193.0	141.0
16th	Ryan Anderson	Canada	23.0	32.0	(41.0)	11.0	7.0	31.0	7.0	5.0	25.0	182.0	141.0
17th	Nico Naujock	Germany	18.0	35.0	(37.0)	7.0	14.0	24.0	10.0	4.0	31.0	180.0	143.0
18th	Uffe Tomasgaard	Norway	31.0	15.0	24.0	12.0	25.0	(39.0)	12.0	26.0	3.0	187.0	148.0
19th	Ben Whaley	United Kingdom	9.0	21.0	7.0	8.0	10.0	5.0	(52.0 BFD)	52.0 BFD	37.0	201.0	149.0
20th	Yoshihiro Suzuki	Japan	12.0	1.0	4.0	27.0	(39.0)	33.0	33.0	14.0	29.0	192.0	153.0
21st	Arthit Romanyk	Thailand	24.0	10.0	15.0	19.0	24.0	15.0	(52.0 BFD)	27.0	23.0	209.0	157.0
22nd	Olle Lindbom	Sweden	36.0	6.0	20.0	18.0	18.0	(38.0)	8.0	24.0	30.0	198.0	160.0
23rd	Junrui Lu	Singapore	4.0	8.0	11.0	15.0	(42.0)	35.0	40.0	37.0	12.0	204.0	162.0
24th	Nooa-Henrik Laukkanen	Finland	8.0	18.0	(36.0)	24.0	26.0	36.0	3.0	22.0	27.0	200.0	164.0
25th	Conor Quinn	Ireland	(35.0)	11.0	25.0	23.0	34.0	7.0	23.0	21.0	24.0	203.0	168.0
26th	Yilkan Timursah	Turkey	19.0	37.0	32.0	13.0	21.0	10.0	11.0	(38.0)	35.0	216.0	178.0
27th	Luis-Pedro Carrero Mauttoni	Uruguay	16.0	23.0	10.0	34.0	(37.0)	34.0	26.0	15.0	21.0	216.0	179.0
28th	Stijn Paardekooper	Netherlands	34.0	(47.0)	39.0	36.0	38.0	13.0	9.0	3.0	11.0	230.0	183.0
29th	Marcelo Cairo	Spain	30.0	24.0	34.0	17.0	16.0	30.0	18.0	(35.0)	14.0	218.0	183.0
30th	Benjamin Prikryl	Czech Republic	20.0	(48.0)	33.0	42.0	9.0	16.0	22.0	33.0	22.0	245.0	197.0
31st	Junlong Wang	China	15.0	38.0	26.0	16.0	(43.0)	22.0	19.0	31.0	33.0	243.0	200.0
32nd	Wojciech Klimaszewski	Poland	22.0	28.0	35.0	(52.0 DNF)	13.0	9.0	37.0	39.0	28.0	263.0	211.0
33rd	Thad Lettsome	British Virgin Islands	(42.0)	27.0	29.0	29.0	23.0	29.0	30.0	34.0	13.0	256.0	214.0
34th	Luc Chevrier	Saint Lucia	28.0	29.0	31.0	28.0	32.0	28.0	21.0	28.0	(34.0)	259.0	225.0
35th	Malcolm-Benn Smith	Bermuda	32.0	31.0	(46.0)	32.0	22.0	44.0	27.0	13.0	32.0	279.0	233.0
36th	Gerardo Benitez	Mexico	33.0	45.0	12.0	26.0	40.0	(47.0)	42.0	36.0	20.0	301.0	254.0
37th	Johan Schubert	Denmark	41.0	41.0	42.0	45.0	(48.0)	20.0	31.0	20.0	18.0	306.0	258.0
38th	Tijn van Der Gulik	Netherlands Antilles	10.0	46.0	(47.0)	41.0	30.0	32.0	32.0	32.0	46.0	316.0	269.0
39th	Nikola Banjac	Serbia	38.0	25.0	30.0	31.0	(52.0 BFD)	23.0	47.0	30.0	48.0	324.0	272.0
40th	Thorwen Uiterwaal	Hong Kong	(43.0)	33.0	23.0	38.0	35.0	26.0	38.0	40.0	41.0	317.0	274.0
41st	Rodrigo Carbajal	Peru	29.0	26.0	28.0	47.0	(49.0)	19.0	46.0	42.0	38.0	324.0	275.0
42nd	Zoltán Veisse	Hungary	37.0	42.0	(48.0)	33.0	29.0	43.0	34.0	18.0	43.0	327.0	279.0
43rd	Seung Kim	South Korea	(44.0)	44.0	44.0	39.0	31.0	37.0	15.0	41.0	39.0	334.0	290.0
44th	Teakuao Framhein	Cook Islands	46.0	40.0	17.0	46.0	36.0	46.0	35.0	43.0	(49.0)	358.0	309.0
45th	Eriks-Karlis Zvilna	Latvia	47.0	16.0	38.0	43.0	(52.0 BFD)	45.0	45.0	48.0	36.0	370.0	318.0
46th	Mateo Di Blasi	United States Virgin Islands	(45.0)	39.0	43.0	44.0	27.0	40.0	39.0	45.0	44.0	366.0	321.0
47th	Teariki Numa	Papua New Guinea	50.0	36.0	(51.0)	48.0	47.0	42.0	44.0	44.0	40.0	402.0	351.0
48th	Tzu-Yen Huang	Chinese Taipei	(49.0)	49.0	49.0	37.0	41.0	49.0	36.0	47.0	45.0	402.0	353.0
49th	Jesse Jackson	Cayman Islands	39.0	(51.0)	50.0	40.0	44.0	48.0	41.0	49.0	42.0	404.0	353.0
50	Seif Fahmy	Egypt	40.0	43.0	40.0	49.0	45.0	(50.0)	43.0	46.0	47.0	403.0	353.0
51	Viliame Ratulu	Fiji	48.0	50.0	45.0	50.0	46.0	(51.0)	48.0	50.0	50.0	438.0	387.0
