= Pavlos Kontides =

Cypriot sailor

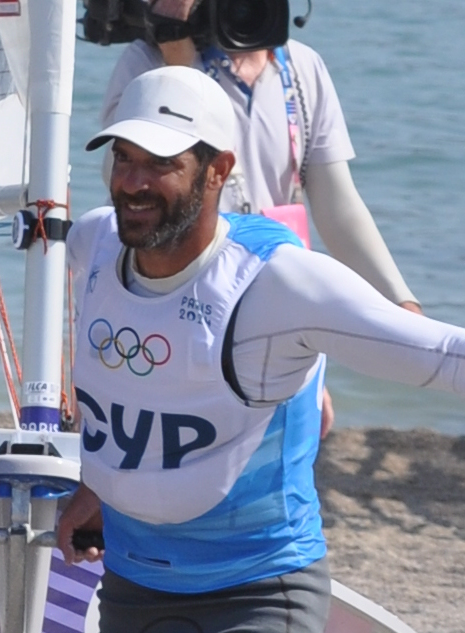
- Kontides at the 2024 Summer Olympics

Personal information
- Native name: Παύλος Κοντίδης
- Nationality: Cyprus
- Born: 11 February 1990 (age 36) Limassol, Cyprus
- Education: University of Southampton
- Height: 182 cm (6 ft 0 in)
- Weight: 82 kg (181 lb)

Sailing career
- Sport: Sailing
Medal record
Men's Sailing
Representing Cyprus
Olympic Games
Silver medal – second place	2012 London	Laser
Silver medal – second place	2024 Paris	Laser
Mediterranean Games
Silver medal – second place	2018 Tarragona	Laser
World Championships
Gold medal – first place	2017 Split	Laser
Gold medal – first place	2018 Aarhus	Laser
Silver medal – second place	2013 Al Musannah	Laser
Silver medal – second place	2022 Puerto Vallarta	ILCA 7
Silver medal – second place	2025 Qingdao	ILCA 7
ISAF Youth Sailing World Championships
Gold medal – first place	2007 Kingston	Laser

Pavlos Kontides (Greek: Παύλος Κοντίδης, born 11 February 1990) is a Cypriot sailor, who became the first and only athlete to win an Olympic medal while competing for Cyprus. He won the silver medal at the 2012 Summer Olympics in the Laser event. Twelve years later at the 2024 Olympics, he won another silver medal in the ILCA 7 competition. In 2012, he won the Giuseppe Sciacca International Awards Sports Prize, and he was named World Sailor of the Year in 2018.

Kontides has won the ILCA 7 World Championship twice, in 2017 and 2018, the latter of which came at that year's ISAF Sailing World Championships.

== Career ==
Kontides won the Laser competition at the ISAF Youth Sailing World Championships in 2007. In the same year, he competed at the Laser World Championships in Cascais, Portugal, where he placed 62nd. This position secured a place for Cyprus at the 2008 Summer Olympics in the Laser competition. Kontides went on to compete in the Olympic event, in which he finished 13th.

In early 2011, a year and a half before the 2012 Olympics in London, Kontides broke his right arm. However, that same year he qualified for those Games, following the 2011 ISAF Sailing World Championships in December 2011, where he placed tenth in the Laser. At the 2012 Olympics, Kontides won Cyprus' first Olympic medal, finishing second in his second Olympics. Despite finishing ninth in the first race of the competition, by the end of day two Kontides was placed second behind eventual gold medal winner Tom Slingsby. Between races five and seven Kontides led the event but following this Slingsby won the final three races of the qualification series to allow the Australian to go on to win the gold, despite finishing ninth in the medal race. Following his success at the Olympics that year, Kontides won the Giuseppe Sciacca International Awards Sports Prize.

In 2013, Pavlos Kontides won his first Laser World Championship medal, finishing second to Brazilian Robert Scheidt. The following year he secured qualification for the 2016 Summer Olympics by finishing tenth at the 2014 ISAF Sailing World Championships. At the Olympics in 2016, Kontides finished seventh. He bore the Cypriot flag during the Parade of Nations in the Maracanã Stadium, in Rio de Janeiro.

Between 2017 and 2018 Kontides won two consecutive Laser World Championships, the latter at the 2018 Sailing World Championships. Also in 2018, he was named Rolex World Sailor of the Year, as well as Cyprus' Athlete of the Year for the fifth time. His 2018 World Championship victory qualified Cyprus for the 2020 Summer Olympics in the Laser competition, where he would miss out on a medal, finishing fourth, three points behind bronze medalist Hermann Tomasgaard of Norway. For the second consecutive Olympic Games, Kontides bore Cyprus' flag in the Parade of Nations.

At the 2023 Sailing World Championships, Kontides finished sixth. This result was enough to qualify him for his fifth consecutive Olympic Games. At the 2024 Olympics, Kontides finished second to Australian Matt Wearn. This was Cyprus' second ever medal at the Olympics. In 2024, following success in that year's Games, he was named Cyprus' Athlete of the Year for the tenth time in twelve years.

In 2025, Kontides publicly stated he intended to compete at the 2028 Summer Olympics in Los Angeles, with the aim of winning Olympic gold and becoming Cyprus’ first Olympic champion. At the Los Angeles Grand Slam, a test event at the Port of Los Angeles, Kontides finished second in the ILCA 7 competition.

== Personal life ==
Kontides was born in Limassol, and he is a member of the Limassol Nautical Club. His father is Dr Panayiotis Kontides, former chair of the Cyprus Sailing Federation.

He studied ship science at the University of Southampton, and got married in 2023 and has a son.

Olympic Games
Preceded by Marcos Baghdatis	Flagbearer for Cyprus; Rio de Janeiro 2016; Tokyo 2020 (with Andri Eleftheriou)	Succeeded by Milan Trajkovic; Elena Kulichenko
