= Sailing at the 2023 Island Games =

- Venue: Guernsey Yacht Club, St Peter Port
- Dates: 8–14 July
- Competitors: 38 from 12 nations

Sailing, for the 2023 Island Games, held in St Peter Port, Guernsey in July 2023

== Events ==
- ILCA 6 Laser Radial
- ILCA 7 Laser Standard
- Sailing Team Event

=== Medal table ===
* Host nation (Guernsey)

Rank	Nation	Gold	Silver	Bronze	Total
1	Åland	1	1	0	2
2	Guernsey*	1	0	0	1
2	Menorca	1	0	0	1
4	Ynys Môn	0	1	1	2
5	Isle of Wight	0	1	0	1
6	Bermuda	0	0	1	1
6	Jersey	0	0	1	1
Totals (7 entries)		3	3	3	9

=== Participating islands ===
- Åland Islands
- Bermuda
- Cayman Islands
- Gibraltar
- Guernsey (Host)
- Isle of Man
- Isle of Wight
- Jersey
- Menorca
- Orkney
- Shetland Islands
- (Anglesey) Ynys Môn

== Results ==
Event	Gold		Silver		Bronze	
ILCA 6 (Laser Radial)	Borja Torres Florit; Menorca	21	Dominic Breen-Turner; Ynys Môn	25	Nicole Stovell; Bermuda	35
ILCA 7 (Laser Standard)	Andrew Bridgman; Guernsey	20	Per Sahlberg; Åland	21	James Tilley; Jersey	30
Team Event	Åland Islands; Thomas Lindström; Per Sahlberg; Johan Sundblom; Erik Wahlsten	142	Isle of Wight; Alex Downer; Noah Evans; Charlie White; Harry White	157	Ynys Môn; Dominic Breen-Turner; Josh Metcalfe; Ryan Seddon; Michael Thorne	175
