= Chris Dold =

Canadian sailor

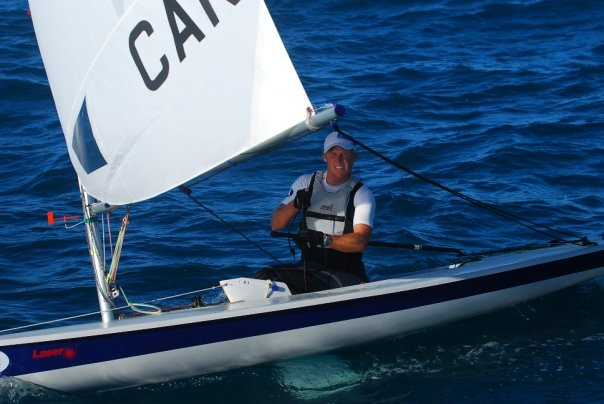
- Canadian Olympic Team Sailor Chris Dold

Personal information
- Nationality: Canadian
- Born: May 26, 1987 (age 37)

Sailing career
- Class: ILCA 7

Chris Dold (born May 26, 1987) is a Canadian sailor from Oakville, Ontario. He is currently a five-time Canadian Sailing National Team member campaigning for the 2016 Olympics in Rio. In 2008, he won the US National Championships and the North American Grand Prix in the Laser (dinghy) class. In 2009, he won the North American Championship and then the Canadian Championship in 2010. In 2012, he won Gills North American Sailor of the Year Award. He ranks 24th in the world according to the International Sailing Federation. He competed in the ISAF World Cup for the 2010 season but suffered a major hip and knee injury which required surgery. He went back to sailing in Florida and trained for a spot on the 2016 Olympic team.
