= Peter Commette =

American sailor (born 1954)

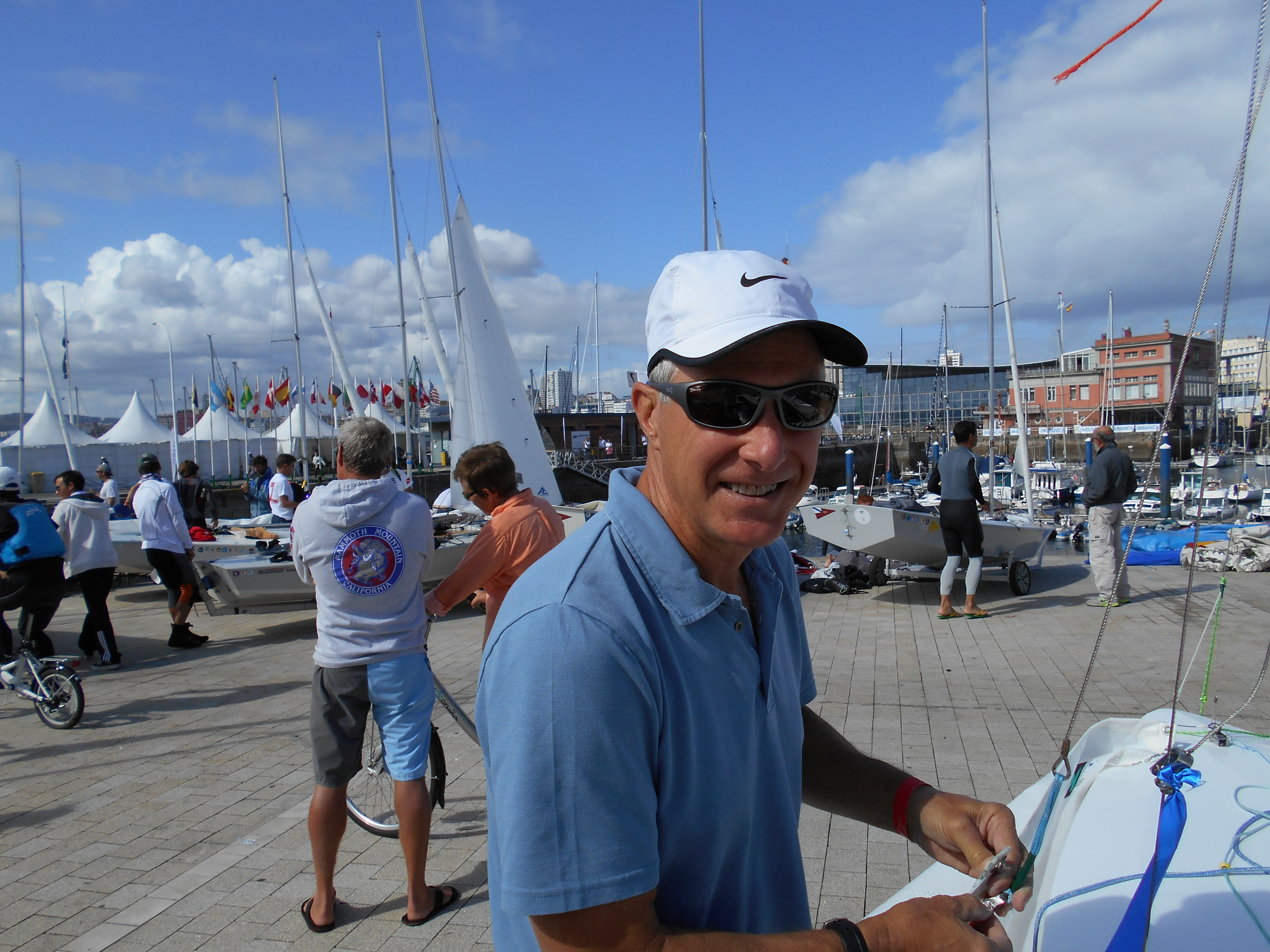
- Commette in 2017

Personal information
- Full name: Peter Michael Commette
- Born: March 13, 1954 (age 72) Bronxville, New York, U.S.
- Height: 6 ft 0 in (183 cm)
- Weight: 190 lb (86 kg)

Sailing career
- Sport: Sailing
- College team: Tufts University
- Club: Lauderdale Yacht Club; Mantoloking Yacht Club

Achievements and titles
- Olympic finals: Montreal 1976. 11th Finn
Medal record
Sailing
Representing United States
Pan American Games
Bronze medal – third place	1991 Havana	Snipe
Laser World Championships
Gold medal – first place	1974 Hamilton	Laser
470 World Championships
Silver medal – second place	1973 Kiel	470
Snipe World Championships
Bronze medal – third place	2007 Porto	Snipe

Peter Michael Commette (born March 13, 1954) is an American sailor who competed in the 1976 Summer Olympics. He raced Finn and finished in 11th place.

He also was champion and 1st in 1974 in the first Laser World Championships; 2nd in 470 World Championships; North American champion in Finn; U.S. National champion in Snipe (1985), 2nd in U.S. E-Scow National Championship; 3rd, 5th, 7th in Snipe World Championships and Bronze Medal in Pan-American Games.
