= Dany Stanišić =

Serbian sailor

Dany Stanišić (born 5 August 1988) is a Serbian sailor. He competed at the 2011 World Championships in the Men's Laser class. He is a member of the AJK Beograd sailing club in Serbia.

== Sailing career ==
Stanišić has been sailing since he was nine. He competed for Slovenia in the beginning of his career. He won a bronze medal at the 2005 Laser 4.7 World Championships for boys under age of 18. He became European Champion in this discipline at Izola in Slovenia in 2005. He was part of the 2011 Emerging Nations Programme.

== Personal life ==
Stanišić currently lives in Piran, Slovenia. He also practised gymnastics and swimming. Dany speaks English, Italian and Slovenian. His aunty (his mother's twin sister) is a 12 times world champion in parachuting and paraski.
