= Karl Suneson =

Swedish sailor

Personal information
- Full name: Karl Ossian Militz Suneson
- Nationality: Sweden
- Born: 30 June 1975 (age 51) Bankeryd, Jönköping, Sweden
- Height: 1.79 m (5 ft 10 1/2 in)
- Weight: 83 kg (183 lb)

Sailing career
- Sport: Sailing
- Club: Royal Swedish Yacht Club
- Coached by: Wilhelm Suneson
- Class: Dinghy
Medal record
Men's sailing
Representing Sweden
World Championships
Silver medal – second place	2002 Cape Cod	Laser
Bronze medal – third place	1999 Melbourne	Laser

Karl Ossian Militz Suneson (born 30 June 1975 in Bankeryd, Jönköping) is a retired Swedish sailor, who specialized in the Laser class. He obtained two medals in his respective category at the Laser World Championship (1999 and 2002), and also represented his nation Sweden in two editions of the Olympic Games (2000 and 2004). Suneson trained throughout most of his sporting career for the Royal Swedish Yacht Club in Saltsjöbaden under his personal coach and brother Wilhelm Suneson.

Suneson made his official debut at the 2000 Summer Olympics in Sydney, where he placed fourteenth in the Laser class with a grade of 107, falling short from the top ten spot by a thirteen-point deficit.

Two years later, Suneson reached the summit of his sailing career upon taking home the gold medal at the European Championships in Vallensbæk, Denmark. Two months after celebrating his first victory, Suneson sailed a marvelous stretch to add a silver in his collection at the ISAF World Championships in Cape Cod, Massachusetts, United States with a net score of 40, finishing behind Brazil's Robert Scheidt by fifteen points.

At the 2004 Summer Olympics in Athens, Suneson qualified for his second Swedish team in the Laser class by placing eleventh and obtaining a berth from the 2003 ISAF World Championships in Cádiz, Spain. Unlike his previous Olympics, Suneson had a solid feat to climb extensively in sixth place with a remarkable grade of 104 net points in the series, but faded his chance of an Olympic medal after his mediocre effort on the final race.
