= Peter Conde =

Australian sailor

Peter Conde (born 2 December 1958) is an Australian sailor and leading Australian sport administrator. From 2017 to 2022, he was the Director of the Australian Institute of Sport.

== Personal ==
Conde was born on 3 December 1958. He has attained a Bachelor of Mechanical Engineering from University of Queensland and Masters of Business Administration from Australian Graduate School of Management. Prior to his appointment as Yachting Australia Performance Manager, Conde worked for international consulting firms Boston Consulting Group and A T Kearney.

== Sailing ==
Conde is a successful sailor with a silver medal in the laser class at the 1979 World Championships and a bronze medal in the etchells class at the 1996 World Championships.

== Sports administration ==
Conde joined Yachting Australia as a consultant after Australia failed to win a medal at the 2004 Summer Olympics. He was appointed the Australian Sailing Team's Performance Director in 2009. During his period as Performance Manager, the Australian Sailing Team won three gold and one silver at the 2012 London Olympics and one gold and three silver at the 2016 Rio Olympics. At the Paralympics, the Australian team won one gold at the 2012 London Paralympics and two gold and oine silver at the 2016 Rio Paralympics. Under his leadership the Australian Sailing Team won Australian Institute of Sport Program of the Year in 2007, 2008, 2010 and 2012.

In August 2017, he was appointed the ninth Director of the Australian Institute of Sport replacing Matt Favier. He departed from the position in January 2022. Sport Australia Chair Josephine Sukkar stated "Peter has been instrumental in developing a world leading athlete wellbeing and engagement function, improving our data analytics and insights capabilities and collaborating successfully with the National Institute Network on the first ever National High Performance Sport Strategy."

Rugby Australia announced in February 2022 that Conde had been appointed Chief Performance Officer.
