= Sailing Aarhus =

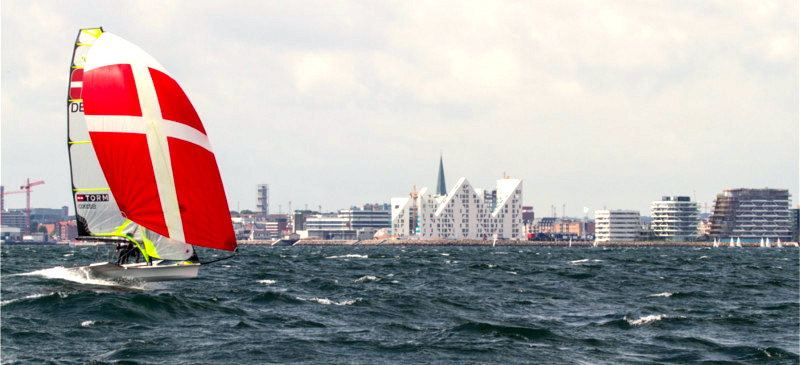
Sailsports in the Aarhus Bay, 2014

Sailing Aarhus is a non-profit, sport event organization and the largest organization for water sports in Denmark with 3000 members. The mission statement is to promote and encourage sailing by attracting and organizing regattas, events and related social activities. The organization has and will host a number of European and world championships in different ship classes of the International Sailing Federation. Headquarters is located in the sports-political centre in Idrættens Hus Vest at the Stadium of Aarhus.

The organization has an extensive network in business and the world of yachting and has close relations to the City of Aarhus within the fields of education, development and environmental research as well as a number of additional authorities and organizations. Sailing Aarhus has a performance contract with The City of Aarhus to attract and host international sailing events and the association is cooperating with the City of Aarhus, the Danish Sailing Association and Team Denmark to manage the “Danish Olympic Elite Training Center” – also called Team Denmark Kraftcenter Aarhus.

== History ==
Sailing Aarhus was founded in 1999 by initiative of the five yacht clubs in Aarhus, Denmark: Kaløvig Yacht Club, Egå Yacht Club, Aarhus Yacht Club, Yacht Club Bugten and Marselisborg Yacht Club and the City of Aarhus (Sport Aarhus Events) and the Danish Sailing Association. The first comprehensive project was to prepare and complete a bidding campaign for the ISAF Sailing World Championships 2003 in Aarhus (The World Championship for all Olympic classes). Aarhus did not win the bidding round but was outmatched by Cádiz, Spain, but in 2014 it was awarded the world championship in 2018 for all 10 olympic class.

In 2014 the A.P. Møller Foundation donated DKK 36 million to the construction of Aarhus Internationale Sejlsportscenter on Aarhus Docklands, which will become the new national watersports stadium.

== Events ==
2014

- Prins Henrik Silver Trophy (Aarhus 14/6-18/6)
- 49er & 49erFX Youth World Championships (Aarhus 27/6-1/7)
- Laser Radial Youth European Championship (Egå 26/6-3/7)
- Zoom 8 World Championships (Kaløvig 28/7-2/8)
- Aarhus Sailing Week/Aarhus Autumn Regatta (Aarhus 30-31/8)
- Torm Youth and Junior Danish Championships (Kaløvig 12-14/9)

2015

- 470 European Championship (Aarhus 26/6-3/7 2015)
- Nacra 17 World Championship (Kaløvig 2-10/7 2015)
- Laser Standard and Laser Radial European Championship (Kaløvig 16-24/7)
- Aarhus Sailing Week

2015

- 470 European Championship (Aarhus 26/6-3/7 2015)
- Nacra 17 World Championship (Kaløvig 2-10/7 2015)
- Laser Standard and Laser Radial European Championship (Kaløvig 16-24/7)
- Aarhus Sailing Week

2016

- Aarhus Sailing Week/Danish Olympic Autumn Regatta (ISAF Grade 3)
- Extreme 40 Sailing Series (in consideration)

2017

- 2018 ISAF Worlds Test Event
- Extreme 40 Sailing Series (in consideration)
- Aarhus Sailing Week/Danish Olympic Autumn Regatta (ISAF Grade 3)

2018

- Volvo Ocean Race Stopover Aarhus (in consideration)
- 2018 Sailing World Championships
- Extreme 40 Sailing Series (in consideration)
- Aarhus Sailing Week/Danish Olympic Autumn Regatta (ISAF Grade 3)

2019

- Folkboat Gold Cup (bidding)
- Volvo Ocean Race Stopover Aarhus (in consideration)
- Aarhus Sailing Week/Danish Olympic Autumn Regatta (ISAF Grade 3)

2020–2022

- Volvo Ocean Race Stopover Aarhus (in consideration)

2024

- Finn Gold Cup (Worlds)
