= Glenn Bourke =

Australian sailor

Glenn Bourke AM
Personal information
- Nationality: Australian
- Born: 11 November 1960 (age 64); Sydney, Australia

Sport
- Sport: Sailing

Glenn Bourke AM (born 11 November 1960) is an Australian sailor. He competed in the Finn event at the 1992 Summer Olympics.
