= Wannes Van Laer =

Belgian sailor

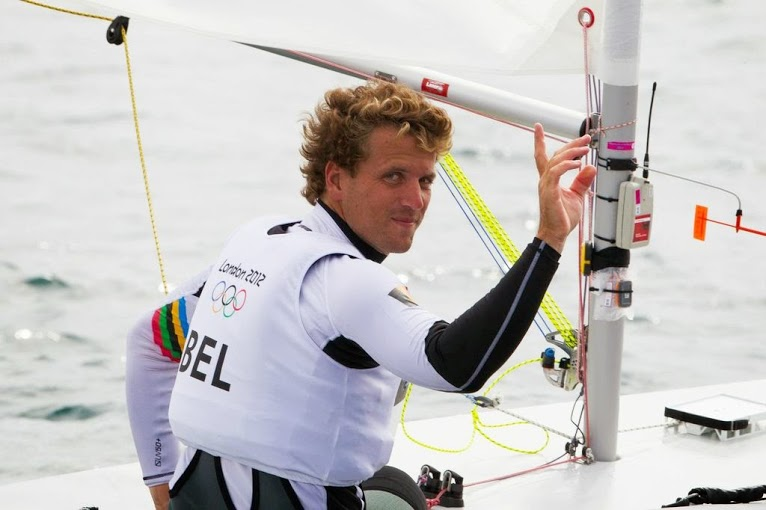
- Van Laer during the London 2012 Olympics

Personal information
- Nationality: Belgian
- Born: 5 March 1985 (age 41) Ostend, West Flanders, Belgium
- Height: 1.81 m (5 ft 11 in)
- Weight: 82 kg (181 lb)

Sailing career
- Sport: Sailing
- Club: BRYC
- Coached by: Gonçalo Pereira de Carvahlo
- Class: Laser Standard

Achievements and titles
- Olympic finals: 2012 Summer Olympics: 34th
- Updated on 17 November 2013

Wannes Van Laer (born 5 March 1985 in Ostend) is a professional Belgian sailor representing the country at three Olympics. Van Laer sails under the colours of the Wallonia-Brussels Federation, for the FFYB.

== Results ==
=== Olympics ===
- 2020 Summer Olympics in the Male ILCA 7 (Laser) class, where he finished in 27th place.
- 2016 Summer Olympics in the Male Laser class, where he finished in 17th place.
- 2012 Summer Olympics in the Men's Laser class, where he finished in 34th place.

=== World Championships ===
Title	Gender	Year	Pos.
OK Dinghy World Championship	Open	2026	2
ILCA 7 World Championship	Male	2022	49
ILCA 7 World Championship	Male	2021	42
ILCA 7 World Championship	Male	2020	11
ILCA 7 World Championship	Male	2019	34
ILCA 7 World Championship	Male	2018	29
ILCA 7 World Championship	Male	2017	21
ILCA 7 World Championship	Male	2016	20
ILCA 7 World Championship	Male	2015	71
ILCA 7 World Championship	Male	2014	42
ILCA 7 World Championship	Male	2013	32
ILCA 7 World Championship	Male	2011	62
ILCA 7 World Championship	Male	2010	75
ILCA 7 World Championship	Male	2005	73
ILCA 7 World Championship	Open	2003	91
Youth ILCA 6 World Championships	Open	2001	39
Optimist World Championships	Open	1996	65

=== Other ILCA 7 Events ===
Year	Regatta
2013	SOF La Rochelle: 10th; World Cup Sail for Gold Regatta: 11th; World Cup Kieler Woche: 10th
2012	Sailing at the 2012 Summer Olympics: 34th; World Cup Sail Melbourne: 8th; World Cup Kieler Woche: 11th
2011	EC Helsinki, Finland: 19th; Eurolymp Riva del Garda: 12th; World Cup Kieler Woche: 16th; World Cup Rolex Miami OCR: 11th
2010	World Cup Sail Melbourne: 15th; World Cup Kieler Woche: 8th

Since 2013 he became Belgian Champion Laser Standard for the sixth time.

=== Other classes ===
Result	Year	Class	Regatta
Gold medal – first place	2009	/	Voiles de Saint-Tropez (Yachting)
Bronze medal – third place	2003	Finn	EC youth Sweden
7th	2000	Europe	EC Spain
Bronze medal – third place	1999	Ponant	EC France
Bronze medal – third place	1998	Optimist	EC Croatia
Gold medal – first place	1996	Optimist	WC (U13) South-Africa

=== World ranking ===
Highest position on the World Sailing world ranking so far (updated: 17 juni 2013): 16th
