= Tom Burton (sailor) =

Australian sailor (born 1990)

Personal information
- Nationality: Australian
- Born: 27 June 1990 (age 36) Baulkham Hills, New South Wales
- Height: 180 cm (5 ft 11 in)
- Weight: 81 kg (179 lb)

Sailing career
- Sport: Sailing
- Club: Middle Harbour Yacht Club
- Coached by: Michael Blackburn
- Classes: ILCA 7, 49er, ILCA 6
Medal record
Sailing
Representing Australia
Olympic Games
Gold medal – first place	2016 Rio de Janeiro	Laser
World Championships
Silver medal – second place	2011 Santander	Laser
Silver medal – second place	2017 Split	Laser
Gold medal – first place	2019 Sakaiminato	Laser

Tom Burton OAM (born 27 June 1990) is an Australian competitive sailor. He won the gold medal at the 2016 Summer Olympics in Rio de Janeiro in the men's Laser class. He was awarded an Order of Australia Medal in 2017.

In 2016 Burton was named as the Australian Sailing Male Sailor of the Year Award in Sydney.

Burton won the 2019 Laser Standard Men's World Championship in Sakaiminoto, Japan.
