= George Gautrey =

New Zealand sailor (born 1998)

Personal information
- Born: 19 January 1998 (age 28) England

Sailing career
- Sport: Sailing
- Club: Muritai Yacht Club
- Class: ILCA 7
Medal record
Men's sailing
Representing New Zealand
Sailing
Sailing World Championships
Bronze medal – third place	2023 The Hague	Men's ILCA 7
ILCA 7 World Championship
Bronze medal – third place	2019 Sakaiminato	Laser Standard
Youth Sailing World Championships
Silver medal – second place	2015 Langkawi	Boy's Laser Radial

George Gautrey (born 19 January 1998) is a British-New Zealand sailor, who competes in ILCA 7 competitions internationally.

He won bronze medals at the 2019 Laser Standard World Championships and the 2023 Sailing World Championships in the ILCA 7.

His third place at the 2023 World Sailing Championships in the ILCA 7, securing a spot for New Zealand at the 2024 Summer Olympics in the class, which would be filled by Tom Saunders.
