= Kaarle Tapper =

Finnish sailor (born 1995)

Personal information
- Nationality: Finnish
- Born: 19 September 1995 (age 29); Helsinki, Finland
- Height: 190 cm (6 ft 3 in)
- Weight: 84 kg (185 lb)

Sailing career
- Class(es): Byte, ILCA 7, Europe, ILCA 6
- Club: Helsingfors Segelklubb

Kaarle Tapper (born 19 September 1995) is a Finnish competitive sailor. He competed at the 2016 Summer Olympics in Rio de Janeiro, in the men's Laser class.

He has qualified to represent Finland at the 2020 Summer Olympics.
