= Nick Thompson (sailor) =

British sailor

Personal information
- Nationality: British
- Born: 5 May 1986 (age 40) Southampton, England, UK
- Height: 179 cm (5 ft 10 in)
- Weight: 80 kg (176 lb)

Sailing career
- Sport: Sailing
- Club: Royal Lymington Yacht Club
- Class(es): ILCA 7, Optimist, Farr 30, ILCA 6

Nick Thompson (born 5 May 1986 in Southampton, England) is a British competitive sailor and one of the most decorated Laser Sailors of all time with 6 World Championship medals including back to back world titles along with multiple European Championship medals.

At the 2016 Summer Olympics, Thompson finished 6th in the Laser event .

== Career ==
=== World Championships Titles ===
- 1st 2015 Laser World Championships
- 1st 2016 Laser World Championships
