= Michael Blackburn (sailor) =

Australian sailor (born 1970)

Medal record

Sailing

Representing Australia

Olympic Games
Bronze medal – third place	2000 Sydney	Laser

Michael Blackburn (born 27 May 1970 in Sydney) is an Australian Olympic medallist, sailor and coach. He is well known for his crossing of Bass Strait in a Laser dinghy. He did so on 9 March 2005 in a record time (for sailing) of 13 hours 1 minute.

In March 2005, he was ranked 3rd in the world in the Laser, behind Robert Scheidt of Brazil and Paul Goodison of Great Britain, and ahead of Mark Mendelblatt of the United States.

Blackburn also won the 2006 Laser World Championships in Jeju, Korea. He placed 9th at the 2004 Summer Olympics in Athens, Greece. He won a bronze medal in the 2000 Summer Olympics in Sydney, Australia.

Blackburn has coached three Gold medalists in three Olympics: He was coach of Australian Olympic Gold medalist Tom Slingsby in the Laser class at the 2012 Summer Olympics in London. He followed this by coaching Tom Burton to gold in the Laser class at the 2016 Summer Olympics. In 2021, he coached Matt Wearn to Gold in the Laser class at the 2020 Summer Olympics.

In 2016 and 2019, he was named Coach of the Year at the Australian Institute of Sport Performance Awards.

Outside of sailing, Blackburn has a PhD in Human Movement Studies and was an Australian Institute of Sport scholarship holder.
