= Bruno Fontes =

Brazilian sailor (born 1979)

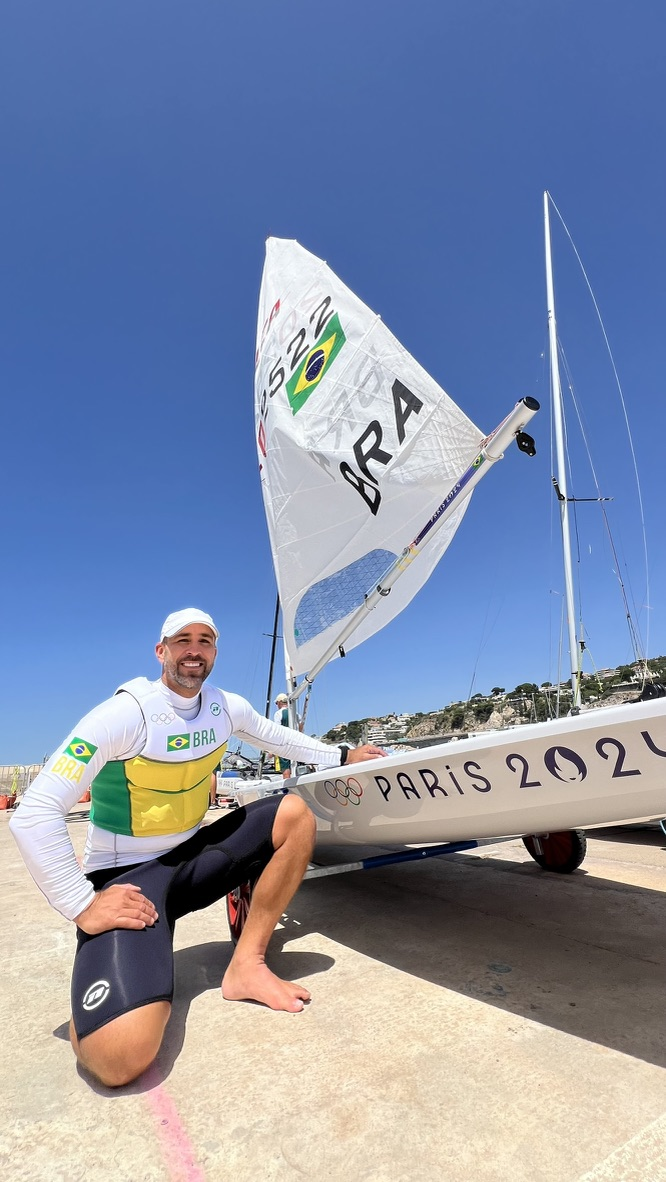
- Fontes with his dinghy

Personal information
- Full name: Bruno Fontes Ferreira da Silva
- Born: 25 September 1979 (age 46) Paraná, Brazil
- Height: 175 cm (5 ft 9 in)
- Weight: 80 kg (176 lb)

Sailing career
- Country: Brazil
- Sport: Sailing
Medal record
Men's sailing
Representing Brazil
Pan American Games
Silver medal – second place	2019 Lima	Laser

Bruno Fontes Ferreira da Silva (born 25 September 1979) is a Brazilian sailor. Fontes started sailing at the age of 8 in Florianópolis. Most of his success came in the men's laser class, appearing in three Olympic Games, 27th place at the 2008 Summer Olympics, 13th place at the 2012 Summer Olympics, and 28th place at the 2024 Summer Olympics.

== Achievements ==
- Silver medalist at the 2019 Pan American Games
- 27th place at the 2008 Summer Olympics in the Men's Laser
- 13th place at the 2012 Summer Olympics in the Men's Laser
- 28th place at the 2024 Summer Olympics in the Men's Dinghy
- Eight-time Brazilian champion (2006, 2008, 2009, 2010, 2011, 2015, 2021, 2026)
- World Master Champion (2025)
- South American champion (2008)
- Gold and Silver at the South American Games

== Career as Coach ==
Fontes has worked as an Olympic coach, participating in the 2016 Rio Olympic Games and coaching sailors in China from 2019 to 2020. He specializes in performance coaching and has developed coaching methodologies based on his Olympic experience.

== Instituto Bruno Fontes ==
The Instituto Bruno Fontes is an organization dedicated to athlete development and educational practices in sailing. The institute focuses on preparing young athletes for competitive sailing and has impacted over 200 youth sailors.

== Programs and Services ==
Through his coaching practice, Fontes offers various programs including:

- Sailing Experience – A leadership and development program for executives and corporate teams
- Performance coaching for competitive sailors
- Educational clinics and workshops on sailing techniques and Olympic-level training
- Speaking engagements on sports performance and athletic development

The programs are based in Florianópolis, Brazil, and combine Olympic-level coaching methodologies with educational principles.
