= Joel Rodríguez (sailor) =

Spanish sailor

Personal information
- Full name: Joel Rodríguez Pérez
- Nationality: Spanish
- Born: 6 October 1997 (age 28) Las Palmas de Gran Canaria, Spain

Sailing career
- Sport: Sailing
- Class(es): ILCA 7, ILCA 4, ILCA 6
Medal record
Sailing
Representing Spain
Mediterranean Games
| Bronze medal – third place | 2018 Tarragona | Laser |
| Silver medal – second place | 2022 Oran | Laser |

Joel Rodríguez Pérez (Note: In this Spanish name, the first or paternal surname is Rodríguez and the second or maternal family name is Pérez.) (born 6 October 1997) is a Spanish sailor. In 2017 he won the Laser Junior World Championships. He competed at the 2020 Summer Olympics in the Laser class.
