= Finn Lynch =

Irish Olympic Laser Sailor

Personal information
- National team: Ireland
- Born: 23 April 1996 (age 30)

Sailing career
- Sport: Sailing
Medal record
Representing Ireland
ILCA 7 World Championship
Silver medal – second place	2021 Barcelona	Laser
World Youth Championships
Silver medal – second place	2012 Dublin	ILCA 6

Finn Lynch (born 23 April 1996) is an Irish sailor who represented Ireland at both the 2016 and 2024 Summer Olympics in the Laser class placing 32nd and 10th respectively.

In path to olympic sailing was via the Topper class in which he won a silver medal at the 2009 Topper World Championships. He competed in the ILCA throughout his Olympic sailing career with the highlight being a silver at the 2021 ILCA 7 Men's World Championship.
