= Rasmus Myrgren =

Swedish sailor

Personal information
- Full name: Paul Rasmus Myrgren
- Nationality: Swedish
- Born: 25 November 1978 (age 47) Lindome, Sweden
- Height: 1.75 m (5 ft 9 in)
- Weight: 80 kg (176 lb)

Sailing career
- Sport: Sailing
- Club: Royal Gothenburg Yacht Club
- Class: Laser
Medal record
Sailing
Representing Sweden
Olympic Games
Bronze medal – third place	2012 London	Laser class
World Championships
Bronze medal – third place	2006 Jeju	Laser class

Paul Rasmus Myrgren (born 25 November 1978) is a Swedish sailor competing for GKSS. He competed in the 2008 Summer Olympics and in the 2012 Summer Olympics in the Laser class.

Rasmus Myrgren is the only laser sailor in history who has entered the medal race at the Olympic Games, in a medal position, in two consecutive Olympic Games (Medal races was first used in 2008).

In 2008, he came into the medal race in silver position and the only one who could take the Gold from Paul Goodison. In the medal race a helicopter filming Rasmus Myrgren and Paul Goodison altered the wind so both competitors started 1 minute after the rest of the fleet consequently finishing last and second to last in the medal race. This caused Rasmus Myrgren to finish in 6th place overall at the 2008 Olympic Games.

In the 2012 Summer Olympics Rasmus Myrgren won the bronze medal.

Myrgren also finished 3rd in the 2006 Laser World Championships. Rasmus has also won medals att 2 different pre-Olympic games (Athens and Beijing) and a gold medal at the Miami Olympic class regatta.

After the Olympic games in 2012 Rasmus started coaching the US sailing team and later started working as a commodity trader.

He has pursued a M.Sc. degree in mechanical engineering at Chalmers University of Technology in Gothenburg.
