= Philipp Buhl =

German competitive sailor

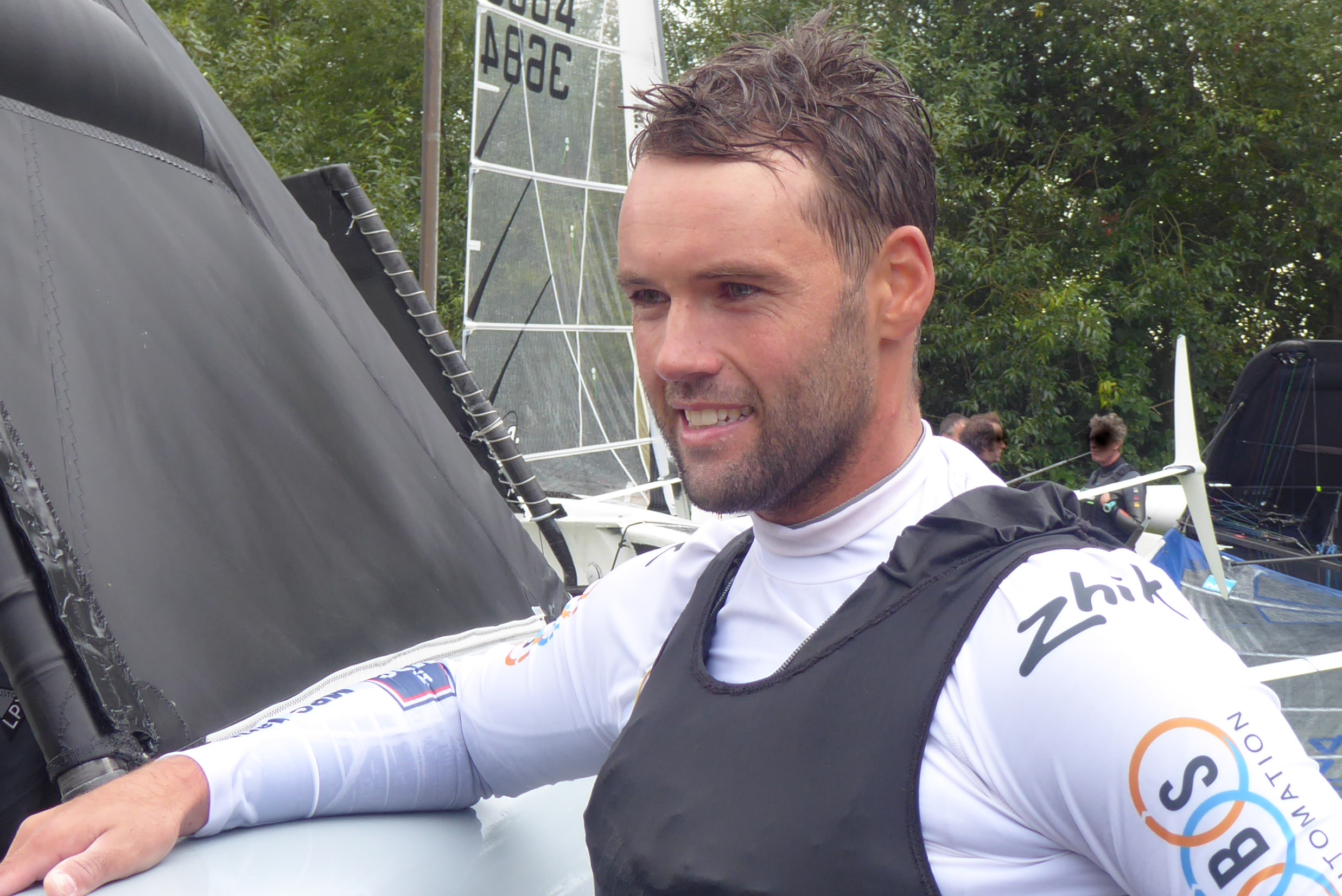
- Philipp Buhl (2019)

Personal information
- Nickname: Buhli
- Nationality: Germany
- Born: 19 December 1989 (age 36) Immenstadt i. Allgäu, Germany
- Height: 187 cm (6 ft 2 in)
- Weight: 86 kg (190 lb)

Sailing career
- Sport: Sailing
- Club: Segelclub Alpsee Immenstadt; Norddeutscher Regattaverein; Kieler Yacht Club
- Class(es): ILCA 7, Optimist, int. moth class
Medal record
Sailing
Representing Germany
Event	1st	2nd	3rd
Olympic Games	0	0	0
World Championships	1	1	2
European Championships	1	2	1
Kiel Week	6	2	1
World Championships
Bronze medal – third place	2013 Oman	Laser
Silver medal – second place	2015 Kingston	Laser
Bronze medal – third place	2018 Aarhus	Laser
Gold medal – first place	2020 Melbourne	Laser
European Championships
Gold medal – first place	2012 Hourtin	Laser
Silver medal – second place	2015 Aarhus	Laser
Bronze medal – third place	2019 Porto	Laser
Silver medal – second place	2026 Kaštela	Laser
Kiel Week
Bronze medal – third place	2010 Kiel	Laser
Silver medal – second place	2011 Kiel	Laser
Gold medal – first place	2012 Kiel	Laser
Gold medal – first place	2013 Kiel	Laser
Gold medal – first place	2014 Kiel	Laser
Gold medal – first place	2016 Kiel	Laser
Gold medal – first place	2018 Kiel	Laser
Gold medal – first place	2020 Kiel	Laser
Silver medal – second place	2024 Kiel	ILCA 7
ISAF Youth Worlds
Bronze medal – third place	2007 Kingston	Laser (U19)
Youth European Championships
Bronze medal – third place	2006 Gdynia	Laser (U19)
Gold medal – first place	2007 Hyères	Laser (U19)
Gold medal – first place	2007 Hyères	Laser (U21)
Silver medal – second place	2008 Duarnenez	Laser (U21)
Gold medal – first place	2009 Landskrona	Laser (U21)

Philipp Buhl (born 19 December 1989) is a German sailor who competes in the Olympic boat class ILCA 7 (formerly Laser Standard). He won the 2020 Laser World Championship.

== Career ==
Buhl was born in Immenstadt im Allgäu. He began his sailing career in 2001.

With his historic world title in 2020, the first German title in the class and the first German title in an Olympic event in 20 years, and three Olympic appearances, Philipp Buhl is Germany's most successful ILCA sailor.

In 2024, Buhl finished fourth at the ILCA 7 World Championship in Adelaide, securing his position among the world's best sailors. He also won silver at the Trofeo Princesa Sofía and at Kiel Week, and took bronze at the Semaine Olympique Française.

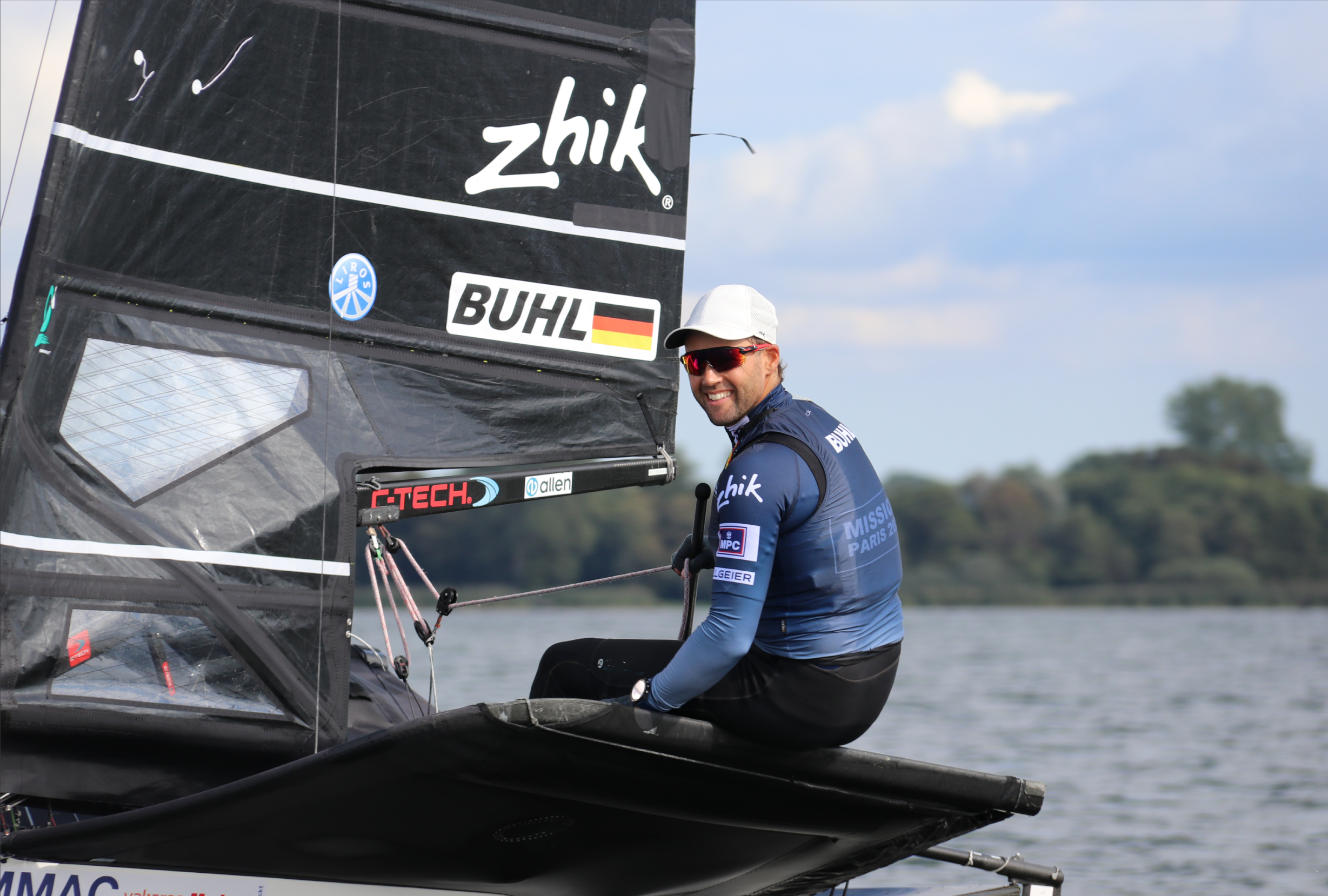
Philipp Buhl sailing the Int. Moth at BE 2023

Philipp Buhl is part of the Bundeswehr Sports Promotion Group and lives in Kiel. He is known for his meticulousness. and his willingness to support his teammates. He has also long served as a representative for athletes.

He regards his 2020 Laser World Championship title in Melbourne as his greatest achievement.

He is a member of the Segelclub Alpsee-Immenstadt and the Norddeutscher Regatta Verein. Buhl sees the greatest challenge in excelling in a discipline where no German had previously won a world title or Olympic medal.

== Awards ==
- 2012: Germany's Sailor of the Year
- 2013: Germany's Sailor of the Year
- 2016: Athlete of the Year in Sonthofen
- 2020: Germany's Sailor of the Year
- 2020: Hamburg's Athlete of the Year
- 2024: Silver Laurel Leaf
