= Sam Meech =

New Zealand sailor (born 1991)

Personal information
- Born: 4 April 1991 (age 35) Portsmouth, England
- Height: 1.83 m (6 ft 0 in)

Sailing career
- Sport: Sailing
- Class: Laser
Medal record
Men's sailing
Representing New Zealand
Olympic Games
Bronze medal – third place	2016 Rio	Laser class

Sam Meech (born 4 April 1991) is a New Zealand sailor who won a bronze medal at the 2016 Summer Olympics.

== Early life ==
Meech was born in Portsmouth, England, in 1991. The sailor Molly Meech is his younger sister; almost exactly two years his junior. When he was three and a half years old, their parents gave up their house and the family lived on a boat for the next decade; the siblings attribute their affinity to water to this period of their lives. He received his secondary education at Tauranga Boys' College, where fellow Olympic sailors Jason Saunders and Peter Burling were his contemporaries.

== Sailing career ==
Meech finished 34th in the Laser class at the 2011 ISAF Sailing World Championships and won a Halberg emerging talent award in 2011.

In 2013 he won the men's Laser race at the Sail for Gold competition and in 2014 he won the men's Laser competition at the EUROSAF Champions Sailing Cup. He was part of the New Zealand team that won the 2013 Youth America's Cup.

Close friends Meech and Andy Maloney had an intense battle to win New Zealand's selection for the one quota spot for the 2016 Summer Olympics. Meech won a bronze medal in the 2015 ISAF Sailing World Cup sailing regatta in Miami (USA) in January, and a silver medal at a later regatta in Hyères (France) in April; these results won him the selection over Maloney. Meech and Josh Junior made up the last two Olympic nominees of the New Zealand sailing team in May 2016. Meech won a bronze medal in the Laser class; the first time that a New Zealand competitor has won an Olympic medal in this class. His sister, Molly Meech, also competed for New Zealand at the 2016 Olympics in the 49er FX class alongside Alex Maloney, the sister of Andy Maloney.
