= Diego Romero (sailor) =

Argentine sailor

Medal record

Sailing

Representing Italy

Olympic Games
Bronze medal – third place	2008 Beijing	Men's Laser

Representing Argentina

Pan American Games
Bronze medal – third place	1999 Winnipeg	Men's Laser
Silver medal – second place	2003 Santo Domingo	Men's Laser

Diego Emilio Romero Paschetta (born 5 December 1974 in Córdoba, Argentina) is an Argentine-Italian sailor.

He earned a bronze medal in Laser at the 1999 Pan American Games on Lake Winnipeg, behind Brazil's Robert Scheidt and Mark Mendelblatt of the United States.

Romero competed at the 2000 Summer Olympics and 2004 Summer Olympics for Argentina. He competed at the 2008 Summer Olympics for Italy, where he won a bronze medal in Laser class.
