= Croatian Sailing Federation =

Governing body of sailing in Croatia

Croatian Sailing Federation CSF
- IOC nation: Croatia (CRO)
- Sport: Sailing
- Official website: www.hjs.hr

HISTORY
- Year of formation: 1950

AFFILIATIONS
- International federation: International Sailing Federation (ISAF)
- ISAF members page: www.sailing.org/about-isaf/mna/croatia.php
- ISAF member since: 1991
- National Olympic Committee: Croatian Olympic Committee

ELECTED
- President: Marijan Hanžeković

SECRETARIAT
- Address: Split
- Country: Croatia
- Secretary General: Ivo Jaic

FINANCE
- Company status: Association

The Croatian Sailing Federation (Croatian: Hrvatski jedriličarski savez, HJS) is the national governing body for the sport of sailing in Croatia, recognised by the International Sailing Federation.

== History ==
The Croatian Sailing Federation was founded in 1950 in Zagreb.
