= Daniil Krutskikh =

Russian sailor (born 2000)

Personal information
- Full name: Daniil Vladimirovich Krutskikh
- Nationality: Russian
- Born: 24 June 2000 (age 26) St. Petersburg, Russia

Sailing career
- Sport: Sailing
- Class: Laser Radial
Competition record
Representing Russia
World Championships
Gold medal – first place	2020 Melbourne	Laser Radial
- Updated on 28 February 2020

Daniil Vladimirovich Krutskikh (Russian: Даниил Владимирович Крутских; born 24 June 2000) is a Russian sailor.

Krutskikh became the first Russian winning gold at the Laser Radial World Championships, doing so in 2020.
