= Matthew Wearn =

Australian sailor (born 1995)

Matthew Wearn OAM
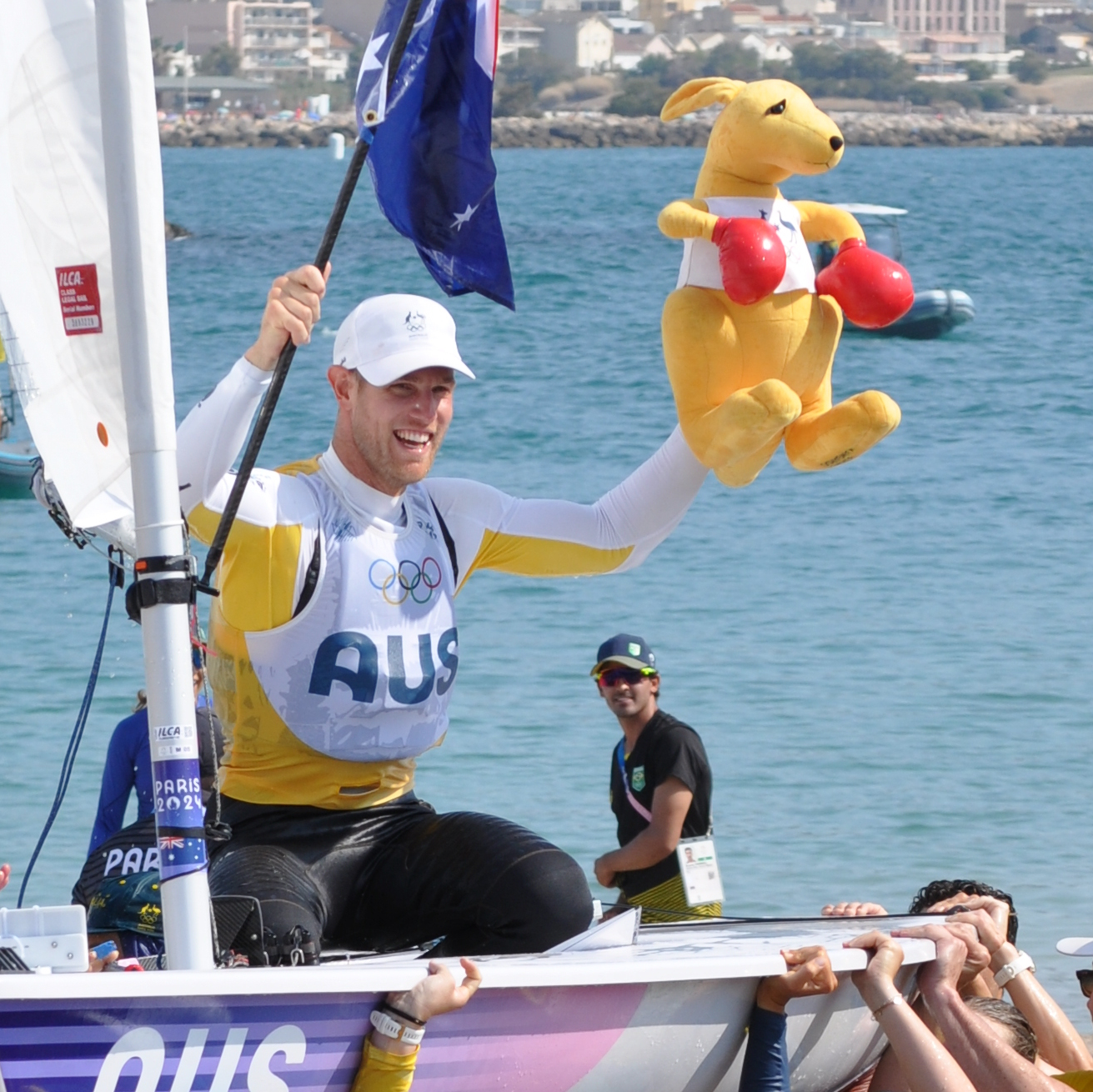
- Wearn at the 2024 Summer Olympics

Personal information
- Nickname: 'Wearny' 'Wearn Dawg'
- Nationality: Australian
- Born: 30 September 1995 (age 31) Perth, Western Australia, Australia

Sailing career
- Sport: Sailing
- Club: Royal Perth Yacht Club; Fremantle Sailing Club; Royal Freshwater Bay Yacht Club
- Classes: ILCA 7, Etchells, ILCA 6
Medal record
Sailing
Representing Australia
Olympic Games
Gold medal – first place	2020 Tokyo	Laser
Gold medal – first place	2024 Paris	Laser
World Championships
Gold medal – first place	2023 The Hague	ILCA 7
Gold medal – first place	2024 Adelaide	ILCA 7
Silver medal – second place	2018 Aarhus	Laser
Silver medal – second place	2019 Sakaiminato	Laser
Silver medal – second place	2020 Melbourne	Laser
Silver medal – second place	2026 Dún Laoghaire	ILCA 7
Bronze medal – third place	2017 Split	Laser

Matthew Wearn OAM (born 30 September 1995) is an Australian competitive sailor. He won gold at the 2020 Summer Olympics and the 2024 Summer Olympics in the men's Laser class.

Wearn has been sailing since he was five years old. He chose the sport over a possible career in Australian Rules football. He was inspired by Beijing Olympic champions Elise Rechichi and Tessa Parkinson who came to his local sailing club in Perth to show young sailors the gold medals they had won in the 470 class.

== Career ==
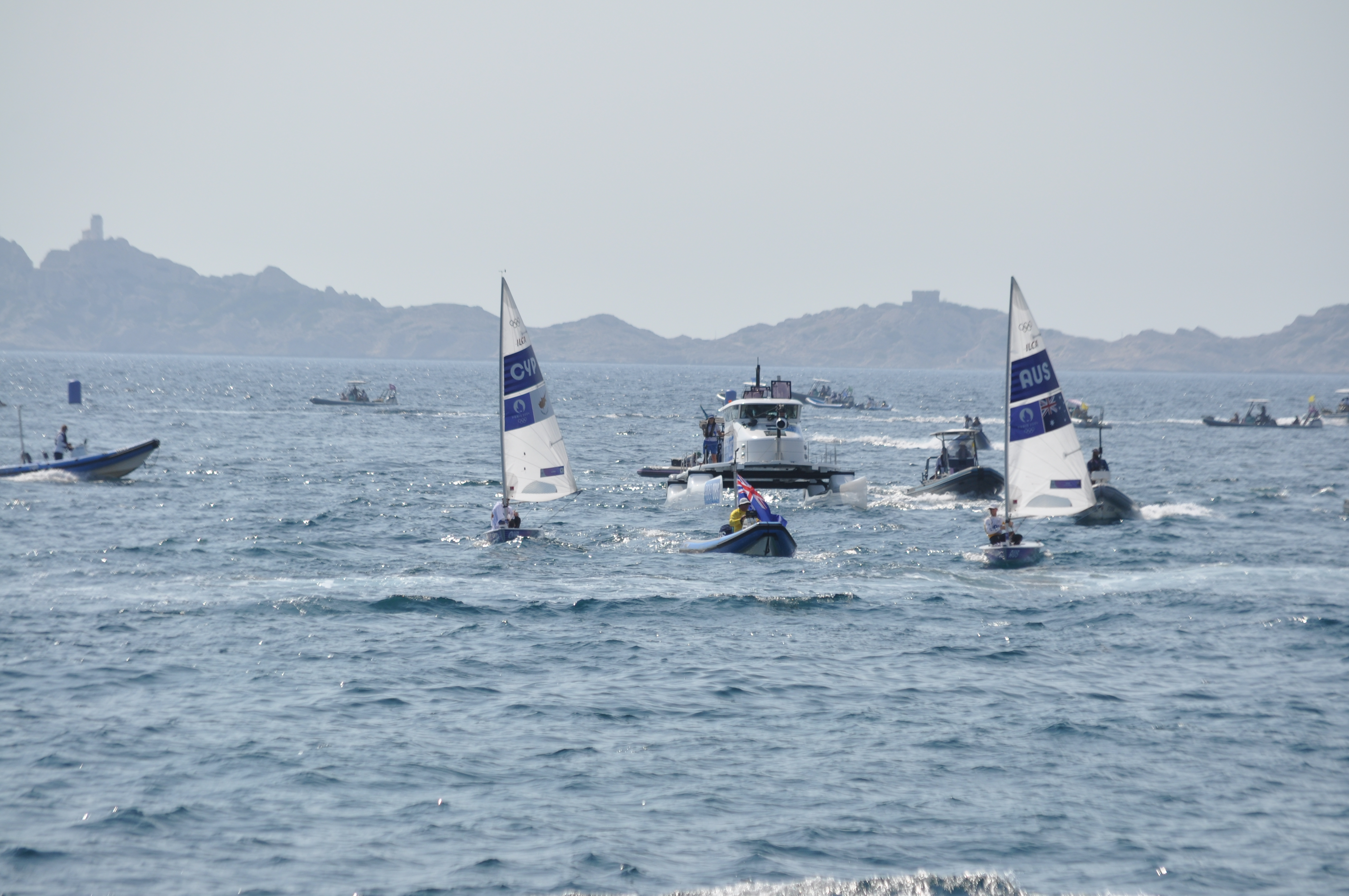
Gold medalist Wearn (right boat) at the 2024 Summer Olympics

Wearn won silver medals at the Laser World Championships in 2018, 2019 and 2020. He qualified to represent Australia at the 2020 Summer Olympics in Tokyo 2021, winning the gold medal in Laser event.

In the 2022 Australia Day Honours Wearn was awarded the Medal of the Order of Australia. In 2023, awarded Male Able-Athlete of the Year at the AIS Sport Performance Awards.

In August 2024, Wearn defended his Olympic title in the Laser class.

In 2024, awarded Male Able-Athlete of the Year at the AIS Sport Performance Awards.

Wearn is a three-time winner of the Australian Sailing Male Sailor of the Year Award (2018, 2023 and 2024) and in 2024 was inducted into the Australian Sailing Hall of Fame.

== Personal life ==
As a 15-year-old, Matt was invited to train with the Western Australian under-15 Australian rules football team, but due to sailing commitments, he had to turn this opportunity down. In 2023, he married Belgian sailor Emma Plasschaert. Following his second Olympic gold medal triumph at the 2024 Paris Olympics, Matt took time to reflect on his next challenge. During this period, he rekindled his passion for cycling, which ultimately led him to join one of Perth’s most vibrant cycling groups, Pickle Juice Cycling.
