= Cyprus Sailing Federation =

Sports governing body in Cyprus

Cyprus Sailing Federation CYSAF
- IOC nation: Cyprus (CYP)
- Sport: Sailing
- Official website: www.cysaf.org.cy

HISTORY
- Year of formation: 1972

DEMOGRAPHICS
- Number of Sailing clubs: Approx. 10

AFFILIATIONS
- International federation: International Sailing Federation (ISAF)
- ISAF member since: 1977
- Continental association: EUROSAF
- National Olympic Committee: Cyprus Olympic Committee

ELECTED
- President: Christos Christoforou (OLY)

SECRETARIAT
- Address: PO Box 51813; 3508 Limassol; +357 25 320559
- Country: Cyprus
- Secretary General: Nicolas Epiphaniou (Elected)

FINANCE
- Company status: Association

The Cyprus Sailing Federation (CYSAF) (Greek: Κυπριακή Ιστιοπλοϊκή Ομοσπονδία, ΚΙΟ) is the national governing body for the sport of sailing in Cyprus, recognised by the International Sailing Federation.

== Famous Sailors ==
See Category:Cypriot sailors

=== Olympic sailing ===
See Category:Olympic sailors of Cyprus

== Yacht clubs ==
See Category:Yacht clubs in Cyprus
