= Tonči Stipanović =

Croatian sailor

Personal information
- Nationality: Croatian
- Born: 13 June 1986 (age 40) Split, SR Croatia, SFR Yugoslavia

Sailing career
- Sport: Sailing
- Class: Laser
Medal record
Sailing
Representing Croatia
Olympic Games
Silver medal – second place	2020 Tokyo	Laser
Silver medal – second place	2016 Rio de Janeiro	Laser
World Championships
Silver medal – second place	1998 Martinique	Optimist
Silver medal – second place	2012 Boltenhagen	Laser
Bronze medal – third place	2020 Melbourne	Laser
European Championships
Gold medal – first place	2010 Tallinn	Laser
Gold medal – first place	2011 Helsinki	Laser
Gold medal – first place	2013 Dublin Bay	Laser
Gold medal – first place	2014 Split	Laser
Mediterranean Games
Gold medal – first place	2013 Mersin	Laser
Silver medal – second place	2009 Pescara	Laser

Tonči Stipanović (born 13 June 1986) is a Croatian sailor. He competed at the 2012 Summer Olympics in the men's Laser event, finishing in 4th place. Stipanović won Croatia's first ever sailing Olympic medal when he came second overall to win silver in the men's Laser event, at the 2016 Summer Olympics in Rio de Janeiro. He came second overall to win silver in the men's Laser event at the 2020 Summer Olympics in Tokyo as well.

Web portal for sailing sailingscuttlebutt.com included him on the list of the top 10 sailors in Laser class of all time.

== Orders ==
- Order of Danica Hrvatska with face of Franjo Bučar – 2016
