= Jean-Baptiste Bernaz =

French sailor (born 1987)

Jean-Baptiste Bernaz OLY
Personal information
- Nationality: France
- Born: 18 July 1987 (age 39) Fréjus
- Height: 190 cm (6 ft 3 in)
- Weight: 80 kg (176 lb)

Sailing career
- Sport: Sailing
- Club: CN Sainte-Maxime
- Coached by: Stephane Christidis [national]; Olivier Pauly [fitness]
- Class: Sailboard
Medal record
Sailing
Representing France
Mediterranean Games
Gold medal – first place	2022 Oran	Men's Laser
Silver medal – second place	2013 Mersin	Men's Laser
Byte World Championship
Gold medal – first place	2005	Byte World Championship

Jean-Baptiste Bernaz (born 18 July 1987 in Fréjus) is a French sailor. He competed at the 2008 Summer Olympics, 2012 Summer Olympics, 2016 Summer Olympics and the 2020 Summer Olympics in the men's Laser class.
