= Hermann Tomasgaard =

Norwegian sailor

Personal information
- Nationality: Norwegian
- Born: 4 January 1994 (age 32) Lørenskog, Norway
- Height: 185 cm (6 ft 1 in)

Sport
- Sport: Sailing
- Club: Royal Norwegian Yacht Club
Medal record
Representing Norway
Olympic Games
| Bronze medal – third place | 2020 Tokyo | Laser |
World Championships
| Gold medal – first place | 2006 | RS Tera |
| Silver medal – second place | 2024 Adelaide | ILCA 7 |
| Silver medal – second place | 2009 Buzios | ILCA 4 |

Hermann Tomasgaard (born 4 January 1994) is a Norwegian olympic sailor, born in Lørenskog.

== World Championships ==
As a youth he won the inaugural RS Tera World Championships in 2006 and followed this up with a Silver at the 2009 ILCA 4 World Championships.

He won a silver medal at the 2024 Laser World Championships in Australia.

== Olympics ==
He qualified to represent Norway at the 2020 Summer Olympics in Tokyo, winning a bronze medal in the Laser.

He was selected to represent Norway at the 2024 Summer Olympics where he finished 5th.
