= Laser Standard =

Sailing dinghy

- Class symbol

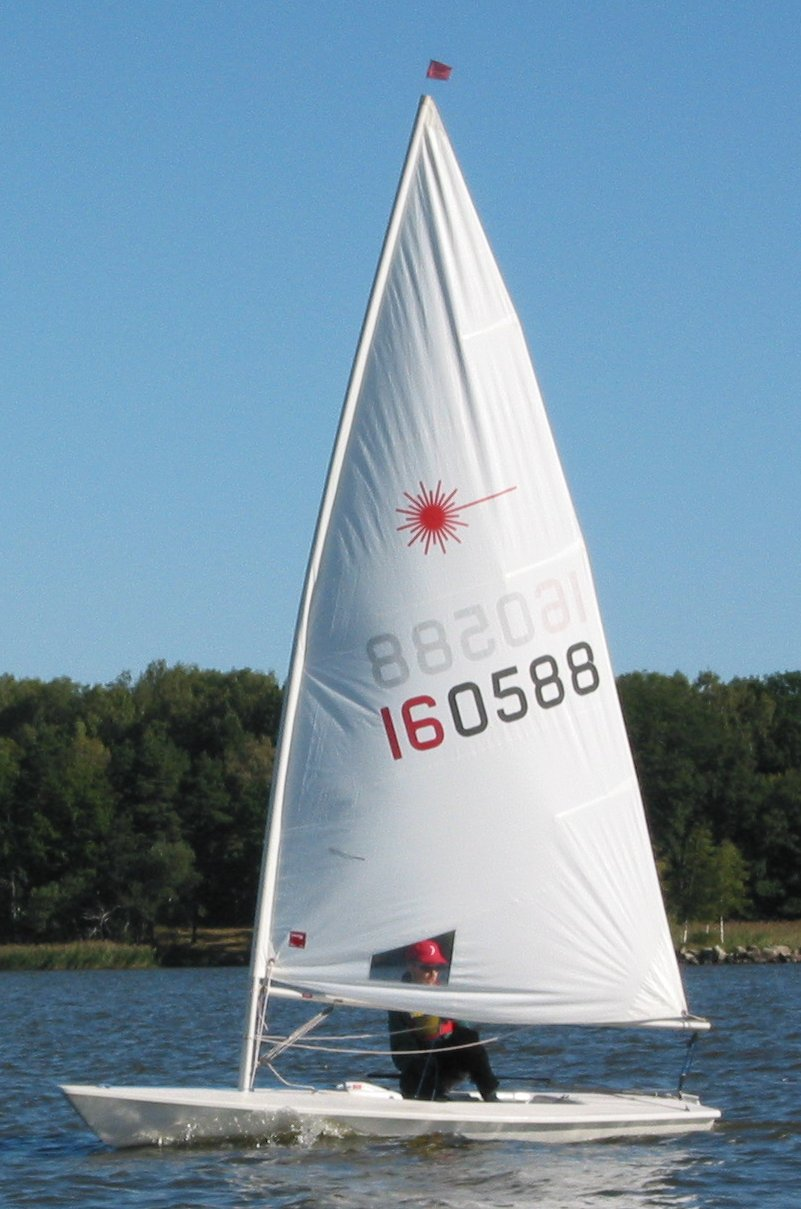
- Laser Standard

Development
- Designer: Bruce Kirby & Ian Bruce
- Year: 1969
- Name: Laser Standard

Boat
- Crew: 1
- Draft: 0.787 m (2 ft 7.0 in)

Hull
- Hull weight: 58.97 kg (130.0 lb)
- LOA: 4.2 m (13 ft 9 in)
- LWL: 3.81 m (12 ft 6 in)
- Beam: 1.39 m (4 ft 7 in)

Sails
- Mainsail area: 7.06 m^{2} (76.0 sq ft)

Racing
- D-PN: 91.1
- RYA PN: 1104
- PHRF: 217

The Laser Standard or ILCA 7 is a popular one-design class of single-handed sailing dinghy, originally built by Performance Sailcraft Canada. The laser is cat rigged, with a single mainsail and is a simple, light and fast boat to sail. The Laser Standard is the original of the Laser family of dinghies, which also includes the Laser Radial and Laser 4.7, both of which use the same hull, but have smaller rigs.

== Events ==
=== Olympics ===
| Games | Gold | Silver | Bronze |
|---|---|---|---|
| 1996 Atlanta | Robert Scheidt; Brazil | Ben Ainslie; Great Britain | Peer Moberg; Norway |
| 2000 Sydney | Ben Ainslie; Great Britain | Robert Scheidt; Brazil | Michael Blackburn; Australia |
| 2004 Athens | Robert Scheidt; Brazil | Andreas Geritzer; Austria | Vasilij Žbogar; Slovenia |
| 2008 Beijing | Paul Goodison; Great Britain | Vasilij Žbogar; Slovenia | Diego Romero; Italy |
| 2012 London | Tom Slingsby; Australia | Pavlos Kontides; Cyprus | Rasmus Myrgren; Sweden |
| 2016 Rio de Janeiro | Tom Burton; Australia | Tonči Stipanović; Croatia | Sam Meech; New Zealand |
| 2020 Tokyo | Matthew Wearn; Australia | Tonči Stipanović; Croatia | Hermann Tomasgaard; Norway |
| 2024 Paris | Matthew Wearn; Australia | Pavlos Kontides; Cyprus | Stefano Peschiera; Peru |
| 2028 Los Angeles | | | |
