= ILCA Under 21 World Championships =

Annual international sailing regatta

The ILCA Under 21 World Championships, until 2020 the Laser Under-21 World Championships, is an annual international sailing regatta for ILCA (dinghy), they are organized by the host club on behalf of the International Class Association and recognized by World Sailing, the sports IOC recognized governing body.

== Editions ==
Editions			Host			Event			Sailors				Ref.
Ed	Date	Year	Host club	Location	Nat.	Rig	Age	Gender			Nat.	Cont.	Ref.
1	27Aug -5Sep	2010	Hayling Island Sailing Club	Hayling Island, Hampshire	United Kingdom	7	U21	Open	119	0	33	5	
2	16-23 Jul	2011	Societe des Regates Rochelaises	La Rochelle, Charente-Maritime	France	6	U21	Male					
2	16-23 Jul	2011	Societe des Regates Rochelaises	La Rochelle, Charente-Maritime	France	7	U21	Male	147	0	37	5	
3	8-15 Apr	2012	Yacht Club Argentino	Buenos Aires	Argentina	7	U21	Open	29	0	19	5	
4	14-21 Jul	2013	Balatonfüredi Yacht Club	Lake Balaton, Balatonfüredi	Hungary	7	U21	Male	138		35	5	
4	14-21 Jul	2013	Balatonfüredi Yacht Club	Lake Balaton, Balatonfüredi	Hungary	6	U21	Female		91	31	4	
5	16-23 Aug	2014	Société des Régates de Douarnenez	Douarnenez, Brittany	France	7	U21	Male	104		33	4	
5	16-23 Aug	2014	Société des Régates de Douarnenez	Douarnenez, Brittany	France	6	U21	Female	-	57	23	4	
6	15-22 Aug	2015	Royal Yacht Club Hollandia	Medemblik	Netherlands	7	U21	Male	155		42	5	
6	15-22 Aug	2015	Royal Yacht Club Hollandia	Medemblik	Netherlands	6	U21	Female	-	74	33	6	
7	9-16 Aug	2016	Kieler Yacht Club	Kiel, Schleswig-Holstein	Germany	7	U21	Male	144		38	5	
7	9-16 Aug	2016	Kieler Yacht Club	Kiel, Schleswig-Holstein	Germany	6	U21	Female	-	57	28	6	
8	26Jul -2Aug	2017	Koninklijke Yacht Club Nieuwpoort	Nieuwpoort	Belgium	7	U21	Male	122		39	5	
8	26Jul -2Aug	2017	Koninklijke Yacht Club Nieuwpoort	Nieuwpoort	Belgium	6	U21	Female		65	26	6	
9	1-8 Jul	2018		Gydnia	Poland	7	U21	Male	133		40	6	
9	1-8 Jul	2018		Gydnia	Poland	6	U21	Female		72	30	5	
10	26Oct -2Nov	2019	Sailing Club Mornar	Split	Croatia	7	U21	Male	144		42	6	
10	26Oct -2Nov	2019	Sailing Club Mornar	Split	Croatia	6	U21	Female		68	29	5	
N/A	17-24 Jul	2020	Fraglia Vela Malcesine	Malcesine, Lake Garda	Italy	Cancelled due to COVID							
N/A	-	2021	Weymouth and Portland National Sailing Academy	Isle of Portland	United Kingdom	Moved due to COVID							
11	20-27 Aug	2021		Gydnia	Poland	7	U21	Male	138		36	5	
11	20-27 Aug	2021		Gydnia	Poland	6	U21	Female		57	21	4	
12	21-28 Aug	2022	Capable Planet Club Nautico	Vilamoura	Portugal	7	U21	Male	158		39	6	
12	21-28 Aug	2022	Capable Planet Club Nautico	Vilamoura	Portugal	6	U21	Female		80	32	5	
13	15-11 Oct	2023	Royal Yacht Club de Tange	Tangier	Morocco	7	U21	Male	115		32	6	
13	15-11 Oct	2023	Royal Yacht Club de Tange	Tangier	Morocco	6	U21	Female	-	66	27	5	
14	1-8 Jul	2024	Clube de Vela de Viana do Castelo	Viana do Castelo	Portugal	7	U21	Male	155		41	6	
14	1-8 Jul	2024	Clube de Vela de Viana do Castelo	Viana do Castelo	Portugal	6	U21	Female	-	80	34	5	
15	22-29 Aug	2025	National Yacht Club & Royal St George Yacht Club	Dún Laoghaire	Ireland	7	U21	Male	139		35	6	
15	22-29 Aug	2025	National Yacht Club & Royal St George Yacht Club	Dún Laoghaire	Ireland	6	U21	Female	-	73	27	5	
15	Jan	2026	Club Deportivo Náutico Castillo del Águila	Playa Blanca, Lanzarote, Canary Islands	Spain	7	U21	Male	96	-	33	6	
15	Jan	2026	Club Deportivo Náutico Castillo del Águila	Playa Blanca, Lanzarote, Canary Islands	Spain	6	U21	Female	-	52	23	4	

== Medalists ==
Year	Rig	Gender	Gold	Silver	Bronze	Ref.
2010	7	Open	Thorbjoern Schierup (DEN)	Francesco Marrai (ITA)	Alex Mills-Barton (GBR)	
2011	6	Male	Juan Carlos Perdomo (PUR)	Mitchell Kennedy (AUS)	Elliot Hanson (GBR)	
2011	7	Male	Sam Meech (NZL)	Alex Mills-Barton (GBR)	Martin Evans (GBR)	
2012	7	Open	Giovanni Coccoluto (ITA)	Stig Steinfurth (DEN)	Aleksander Arian (POL)	
2013	6	Female	Svenja Weger (GER)	Niki Blässar (FIN)	Claretta Tempesti (ITA)	
2013	7	Male	Mitchell Kennedy (AUS)	Hermann Tomasgaard (NOR)	Francesco Marrai (ITA)	
2014	6	Female	Agata Barwinska (POL)	Daphne Van Der Vaart (NED)	Martina Reino Cacho (ESP)	
2014	7	Male	Lorenzo Brando Chiavarini (GBR)	Hermann Tomasgaard (NOR)	Stefano Peschiera (PER)	
2015	6	Female	Maxime Jonker (NED)	Line Flem Høst (NOR)	Monika Mikkola (FIN)	
2015	7	Male	Joel Rodriguez (ESP)	Michael Beckett (GBR)	Benjamin Vadnai (HUN)	
2016	6	Female	Monika Mikkola (FIN)	Vasileia Karachaliou (GRE)	Maité Carlier (BEL)	
2016	7	Male	Jonatan Vadnai (HUN)	Joel Rodriguez (ESP)	Nik Aaron Willim (GER)	
2017	6	Female	Mária Érdi (HUN)	Hannah Anderssohn (GER)	Magdalena Kwasna (POL)	
2017	7	Male	Joel Rodriguez Perez (ESP)	Jonatan Vadnai (HUN)	Daniel Whiteley (GBR)	
2018	6	Female	Anna Munch (DEN)	Carolina Albano (ITA)	Elyse Ainsworth (AUS)	
2018	7	Male	Philipp Loewe (GER)	Max Wilken (GER)	Liam Glynn (IRL)	
2019	6	Female	Wiktoria Gołębiowska (POL)	Valeria Lomatchenko (RUS)	Mariia Kislukhina (RUS)	
2019	7	Male	Juan Pablo Cardozo (ARG)	Clemente Seguel Lacámara (CHI)	Vishnu Saravanan (IND)	
2021	6	Female	Giorgia della Valle (ITA)	Chiara Benini Floriani (ITA)	Marilena Makri (CYP)	
2021	7	Male	Zachary Littlewood (AUS)	Matteo Paulon (ITA)	Julian Hoffmann (GER)	
2022	6	Female	Eline Verstraelen (BEL)	Eve McMahon (IRL)	Giorgia Della Valle (ITA)	
2022	7	Male	Ole Schweckendiek (GER)	José Mendes (POR)	Julian Hoffmann (GER)	
2023	6	Female	Eve McMahon (IRL)	Anja Von Allmen (SUI)	Carlotta Rizzardi (ITA)	
2023	7	Male	Finley Dickinson (GBR)	Oskar Madonich (UKR)	Caleb Armit (NZL)	
2024	6	Female	Eve McMahon (IRL)	Evie Saunders (AUS)	Roos Wind (NED)	
2024	7	Male	Theodor Middelthon (NOR)	Anatol Sassi (ITA)	Mattia Cesana (ITA)	
2025	6	Female	Roos Wind (NED)	Emma Mattivi (ITA)	Frances Beebe (AUS)	
2025	7	Male	Ole Schweckendiek (GER)	Isaac Schotte (AUS)	Athanasios Kyfidis (GRE)	
2026	6	Female	Ginevra Caracciolo Di Brienza (ITA)	Hermionie Ghicas (GRE)	Adriana Castro (ESP)	
2026	7	Male	Antonio Pascali (ITA)	Luka Zabukovec (SLO)	Filip Olszewski (POL)	

== See also - Class Events ==
- ILCA Main Worlds
  - Men's ILCA 6 World Championship
  - Women's ILCA 6 World Championship
  - Open ILCA 7 World Championship No Longer Held
  - Male ILCA 7 World Championship
- ILCA Age Related Worlds
  - Male Under 18 ILCA 4 World Championships
  - Female Under 18 ILCA 4 World Championships
  - Open Youth ILCA 6 World Championships No Longer Held
  - Male Youth ILCA 6 World Championships
  - Female Youth ILCA 6 World Championships
  - Female Under 21 ILCA 6 World Championships
  - Male Under 21 ILCA 7 World Championships
  - Open Over 30,45,55,65,75 ILCA Masters World Championships
- None Class Worlds
  - Youth Sailing World Championships
  - World Sailing Inclusion Championships
