= Youth ILCA 6 World Championships =

The ILCA 6 Youth World Championships, until 2020 the Laser Radial Youth World Championships, have been held every year since 20??, organised by the host club on behalf of the International Laser Class Association and recognised by World Sailing. The current event is split by gender and typically has an age criteria of the sailors being between 15 and 18 in that calendar year. In addition the class host a Female ILCA Under 21 World Championships.

== Editions ==
Event			Host			Sailor							Ref.
Ed.	Date	Year	Host club	City	Country	Rig	Age	Gender			Nat.	Cont.	Ref.
1	-	1988		Falmouth, Cornwall	United Kingdom	6	Youth	Open	62		20		
2	-	1997		Mohemedia	Morocco	6	Youth	Open	98	24	30	5	
3	-	1998		Medemblik	Netherlands	6	Youth	Open	172		33	6	
4	-	1999	Societe des Regates Rochelaises	La Rochelle, Charente-Maritime	France	6	Youth	Open	304		35		
5	-	2000		Cesme	Turkey	6	Youth	Open	124	13	31	6	
6	-	2001		Villanova	Spain	6	Youth	Open	251		33	6	
7	-	2002	Buffalo Canoe Club	Fort Erie, Ontario	Canada	6	Youth	Open	139	35	20	5	
8	2-9 Aug	2003		Riva del Garda	Italy	6	Youth	Open	196	18	27	5	
9	-	2004		Manly, Brisbane, Queensland	Australia	6	Youth	Open	84	23	19	5	
10	10-17 Dec	2005	Iate Clube de Fortaleza	Fortaleza, Ceará	Brazil	6	15-18	Open	76	25	26	6	
11	5-12 Aug	2006	California Yacht Club	Marina del Rey, California	United States	6	15-18	Male	132	-	21	5	
11	5-12 Aug	2006	California Yacht Club	Marina del Rey, California	United States	6	15-18	Female	-	38	12	4	
12	4-11 Aug	2007		The Hague	Netherlands	6	Youth	Male	204	0	29	5	
12	4-11 Aug	2007		The Hague	Netherlands	6	Youth	Female	0	68	26	4	
13	24-29 Mar	2008	Takapuna Boating Club	Takapuna, Auckland	New Zealand	6	Youth	Male	85	-	20	5	
13	24-29 Mar	2008	Takapuna Boating Club	Takapuna, Auckland	New Zealand	6	Youth	Female	-	38	14	4	
14	3-10 Aug	2009		Karatsu	Japan	6	Youth	Male	95	-	24	5	
14	3-10 Aug	2009		Karatsu	Japan	6	Youth	Female	-	39	16	4	
15	17-25 Jul	2010	Largs Sailing Club	Largs	United Kingdom	6	Youth	Male	218	-	40	6	
15	17-25 Jul	2010	Largs Sailing Club	Largs	United Kingdom	6	Youth	Female	-	89	25	5	
16	24-31 Jul	2011	Societe des Regates Rochelaises	La Rochelle, Charente-Maritime	France	6	Youth	Male	271	-	41	6	
16	24-31 Jul	2011	Societe des Regates Rochelaises	La Rochelle, Charente-Maritime	France	6	Youth	Female	-	99	27	5	
17	27Jun -4Jul	2012	Royal Queensland Yacht Squadron	Manly, Brisbane, Queensland	Australia	6	Youth	Male	70	-	8	4	
17	27Jun -4Jul	2012	Royal Queensland Yacht Squadron	Manly, Brisbane, Queensland	Australia	6	Youth	Female	-	35	12	5	
18	27Dec -3Jan	2013/"14	Al Musannah Sports City	Al Musannah	Oman	6	Youth	Male	51	-	22	4	
18	27Dec -3Jan	2013/"14	Al Musannah Sports City	Al Musannah	Oman	6	Youth	Female	-	28	17	3	
19	26Jul -2Aug	2014		Dziwnów	Poland	6	Youth	Male	159	-	32	4	
19	26Jul -2Aug	2014		Dziwnów	Poland	6	Youth	Female	-	81	27	5	
20	14-20 Jul	2015	Canadian Olympic-training Regatta, Kingston	Portsmouth Olympic Harbour, Kingston, Ontario	Canada	6	Youth	Male	142	-	33	5	
20	14-20 Jul	2015	Canadian Olympic-training Regatta, Kingston	Portsmouth Olympic Harbour, Kingston, Ontario	Canada	6	Youth	Female	-	53	20	5	
21	23-30 Jul	2016	Royal St George Yacht Club	Dún Laoghaire	Ireland	6	Youth	Male	229	-	43	5	
21	23-30 Jul	2016	Royal St George Yacht Club	Dún Laoghaire	Ireland	6	Youth	Female	-	76	25	5	
22	11-18 Aug	2017	Royal Yacht Club Hollandia	Medemblik	Netherlands	6	Youth	Male		-			
22	11-18 Aug	2017	Royal Yacht Club Hollandia	Medemblik	Netherlands	6	Youth	Female	-				
23	18-25 Aug	2018	Kieler Yacht Club	Kiel, Schleswig-Holstein	Germany	6	Youth	Male	269	-	43	5	
23	18-25 Aug	2018	Kieler Yacht Club	Kiel, Schleswig-Holstein	Germany	6	Youth	Female	-	96	29	4	
24	24-31 Jul	2019	Canadian Olympic-training Regatta, Kingston	Portsmouth Olympic Harbour, Kingston, Ontario	Canada	6	Youth	Male	160	-	30		
24	24-31 Jul	2019	Canadian Olympic-training Regatta, Kingston	Portsmouth Olympic Harbour, Kingston, Ontario	Canada	6	Youth	Female	-	48	13	4	
N/A	23-31 Jul	2020	COVID										
25	23-31 Jul	2021	Circolo Vela Arco	Lake Garda	Italy	6	15-18	Male	265	-	38	4	
25	23-31 Jul	2021	Circolo Vela Arco	Lake Garda	Italy	6	15-18	Female	-	109	30	4	
26	23-30 Jul	2022	Houston Yacht Club	La Porte, Harris County, Texas	United States	6	15-18	Male	156	-	34	5	
26	23-30 Jul	2022	Houston Yacht Club	La Porte, Harris County, Texas	United States	6	15-18	Female	-	50	21	4	
27	1-9 Jul	2023		Gmina Dziwnow, Dziwnów	Poland	6	15-18	Male	100	-	33	5	
27	1-9 Jul	2023		Gmina Dziwnow, Dziwnów	Poland	6	15-18	Female	-	100	33	5	
28	12-19 Jan	2024	Yacht Club Argentino	Mar del Plata	Argentina	6	15-18	Male	98		26	4	
28	12-19 Jan	2024	Yacht Club Argentino	Mar del Plata	Argentina	6	15-18	Female		31	14	4	
29	28 Jul – 4 Aug	2025	Cabrillo Beach Yacht Club	Los Angeles	United States	6	15-18	Male	140		33	5	
29	28 Jul – 4 Aug	2025	Cabrillo Beach Yacht Club	Los Angeles	United States	6	15-18	Female		81	31	5	
30	14–19 Aug	2026	Aarhus International Sailing Center	Aarhus	Denmark	6	15-18	Male	307		43	4	
30	14–19 Aug	2026	Aarhus International Sailing Center	Aarhus	Denmark	6	15-18	Female		122	35	4	

=== Open Youth World Championship ===
Year	Gold	Silver	Bronze	1st Female	Ref.
1988	Ville Aalto (FIN)	Joakim Berg (SWE)	Jeroen Harderwijk (NED)		
1997	Teddy Questroy (FRA)	Romain Knipping (FRA)	Alastair Gair (NZL)	24th / Sarah Macky (NZL)	
1998	Alastair Gair (NZL)	Evagelos Himonas (GRE)	Gonçalo Gonçalves (POR)	30th / Jo Dikkenberg (AUS)	
1999	Francisco Sánchez Ferrer (ESP)	Luka Radelić (CRO)	Jorge Lima (POR)		
2000	Güray Zümbül (TUR)	Anders Nyholm (DEN)	Arne Nieuwenhuys (NED)	42nd / Katie Archer (GBR)	
2001	Michael Bullot (NZL)	Jason Georgaris (GRE)	Alexandre Monteau (FRA)		
2002	Tonko Kuzmanić (CRO)	Conner Higgins (CAN)	Giles Scott (GBR)	12th / Miranda Powrie (NZL)	
2003	Tonči Stipanović (CRO)	Tonko Kuzmanić (CRO)	Jonasz Stelmaszyk (POL)	32nd / Cecilia Carranza (ARG)	
2004	Jean-Baptiste Bernaz (FRA)	Nathan Outteridge (AUS)	Daniel Mihelić (CRO)	10th / Cecilia Carranza (ARG)	
2005	Blair Mclay (NZL)	Frederico Melo (POR)	Ivan Taritaš (CRO)	46th / Cushla Hume-Merry (NZL)	

=== Male Youth World Championship ===
Year	Gold	Silver	Bronze
2006	Kyle Rogachenko (USA)	Guilherme Barbosa (BRA)	Mathew Archibald (CAN)
2007	Thorbjørn Schierup (DEN)	Ioannis Mitakis (GRE)	Gijs Pelt (NED)
2008	Andy Maloney (NZL)	Martin Evans (GBR)	Maarten-Max Moerman (NED)
2009	Keerati Bualong (THA)	Aleksander Arian (POL)	Filip Kobielski (POL)
2010	Giovanni Coccoluto (ITA)	Tadeusz Kubiak (POL)	Luca Antognoli (ITA)
2011	Giovanni Coccoluto (ITA)	Elliot Hanson (GBR)	Eliot Merceron (FRA)
2012	Henry Wetherell (GBR)	Charles Corston (NZL)	Gaku Kawamura (JPN)
2013	Benjamin Vadnai (HUN)	Gianmarco Planchestainer (ITA)	Sébastien Schneiter (SUI)
2014	Joel Rodríguez (ESP)	Nik Willim (GER)	Benjamin Wempe (NED)
2015	Conor Nicholas (AUS)	Gianmarco Planchestainer (ITA)	Nic Baird (USA)
2016	Henry Marshall (USA)	Ewan McMahon (IRL)	Bernie Chin (SIN)
2017	Dimitris Papadimitriou (GRE)	Matías Dietrich (ARG)	Nicholas Bezy (HKG)
2018	Guido Gallinaro (ITA)	Josh Armit (NZL)	Francesco Viel (ITA)
2019	Yigit Yalçin Çitak (TUR)	Aimilianos Monos (GRE)	Michael Compton (AUS)
2020	CANCELLED COVID		
2021	Mattia Cesana (ITA)	Chapman Petersen (USA)	Sebastian Kempe (BER)
2022	Mattia Cesana (ITA)	Erik Norlén (SWE)	Caleb Armit (NZL)
2023	Mattia Cesana (ITA)	Dima Karabadzhak (UKR)	Hidde Schraffordt (NED)
2024	Antonio Pascali (ITA)	Rem Pulci Magen (ISR)	Jake Homberger (USA)
2025	Alessandro Cirinei (ITA)	Josip Tafra (CRO)	Joaquín Galván (ARG)
2026	Erik Scheidt (BRA)	Nikko Palou (ESP)	Lorenzo Ghirotti (ITA)

==== Female Youth Laser Radial World Championship ====
Year	Gold	Silver	Bronze
2006	Claire Dennis (USA)	Susana Romero (ESP)	Allie Blecher (USA)
2007	Tuula Tenkanen (FIN)	Susana Romero (ESP)	Sarah Gunni (DEN)
2008	Gabrielle King (AUS)	Cushla Hume-Merry (NZL)	Sarah Gunni (DEN)
2009	Mathilde de Kerangat (FRA)	Ashley Stoddart (AUS)	Michelle Broekhuizen (NED)
2010	Erika Reineke (USA)	Manami Doi (JPN)	Michelle Broekhuizen (NED)
2011	Erika Reineke (USA)	Oren Jacob (ISR)	Sandy Fauthoux (FRA)
2012	Maxime Jonker (NED)	Madison Kennedy (AUS)	Georgina Povall (GBR)
2013	Monika Mikkola (FIN)	Celine Therese Herud (NOR)	Line Flem Høst (NOR)
2014	Monika Mikkola (FIN)	Maria Erdi (HUN)	Maité Carlier (BEL)
2015	Mária Érdi (HUN)	Dolores Moreira (URU)	Magdalena Kwaśna (POL)
2016	Zoe Thomson (AUS)	Caroline Rosmo (NOR)	Louise Cervera (FRA)
2017	Hannah Anderssohn (GER)	Dolores Moreira (URU)	Charlotte Rose (USA)
2018	Estere Kumpina (LAT)	Emma Savelon (NED)	Adriana Penruddocke (BER)
2019	Matilda Nicholls (GBR)	Paige Caldecoat (AUS)	Eve McMahon (IRL)
2020	CANCELLED COVID		
2021	Eve McMahon (IRL)	Anja Von Allmen (SUI)	Sara Savelli (ITA)
2022	Eve McMahon (IRL)	Linda Hensel (GER)	Tea Peteh (CRO)
2023	Emma Mattivi (ITA)	Ginevra Caracciolo (ITA)	Roos Wind (NED)
2024	Maria Vittoria Arseni (ITA)	Sienna Wright (IRL)	Ginevra Caracciolo (ITA)
2025	Hermionie Ghicas (GRE)	Alina Shapovalova (UKR)	Féline van Ede (NED)
2026	Hermionie Ghicas (GRE)	Sienna Wright (IRL)	Chloe Turner (NZL)

== See also - Class Events ==
- ILCA Main Worlds
  - Men's ILCA 6 World Championship
  - Women's ILCA 6 World Championship
  - Open ILCA 7 World Championship No Longer Held
  - Male ILCA 7 World Championship
- ILCA Age Related Worlds
  - Male Under 18 ILCA 4 World Championships
  - Female Under 18 ILCA 4 World Championships
  - Open Youth ILCA 6 World Championships No Longer Held
  - Male Youth ILCA 6 World Championships
  - Female Youth ILCA 6 World Championships
  - Female Under 21 ILCA 6 World Championships
  - Male Under 21 ILCA 7 World Championships
  - Open Over 30,45,55,65,75 ILCA Masters World Championships
- None Class Worlds
  - Youth Sailing World Championships
  - World Sailing Inclusion Championships

== See also - World Sailing Events ==
- Sailing World Championships
- Youth Sailing World Championships
