= ILCA Masters World Championships =

The Masters ILCA World Championships, until 2020 the Laser Masters World Championships, is an annual international sailing regatta for Laser (dinghy), they are organized by the host club on behalf of the International Class Association and recognized by World Sailing, the sports IOC recognized governing body.

== Editions ==
Editions				Host			Ref.
No.	Date	Year	Rig	Host club	Location	Nat.	Ref.
1		1980	Full		Bendor	France	Ref.
2		1981	Full		Bendor	France	
3		1982	Full		Sardinia	Italy	
4		1983	Full		Gulfport, Florida	United States	
5		1984	Full		Pattaya	Thailand	
6		1985	Full			Australia	
		1986		NOT HELD			
7		1987	Full		Melbourne	Australia	
8		1988	Full		Falmouth, Cornwall	United Kingdom	
9		1989	Full		Aarhus	Denmark	
10		1990	Full		New Bedord	United States	
11		1991	Full		Porto Carras	Greece	
		1992		NOT HELD			
12		1993	Full		Takapuna	New Zealand	
13		1994	Full		Wakayama	Japan	
14		1995	Full		Tenerife, Grand Canaria	Spain	
15		1996	Radial & Full		Cape Town	South Africa	
16		1997	Radial & Full		ALGARROBO	Chile	
		1998		NOT HELD			
17	15-22 Jan	1999	Radial & Full		Melbourne	Australia	
18	14 March: 1 April	2000	Radial & Full	Club de Vela de Cancun	Cancun	Mexico	
19	10-18 Aug	2001	Radial & Full	Royal Cork Yacht Club	Crosshaven	Ireland	
20	22-29 Sept.	2002	Radial & Full	Hyannis Yacht Club	Hyannis, Cape Cod	United States	
21	26 Sept to 4 Oct	2003	Radial & Full	Centro Nautico Elcano	Cadiz	Spain	
22	21–29 May	2004	Radial & Full		Bodrum	Turkey	
23	30Sep -4Oct	2005	Radial & Full	Iate Clube de Fortaleza	Fortaleza, Ceará	Brazil	
24	23-30 Sept	2006	Radial & Full		Jeju Island	South Korea	
25	27 Sept to 6 Oct	2007	Radial & Full	Grup d’Esports Nautics de Roses	Roses, Catalonia	Spain	
26	15-23 Feb	2008	Radial & Full	Gosford Sailing Club	Terrigal	Australia	
27	19 Aug to 5 Sept	2009	Radial & Full	St. Margaret Sailing Club	Novia Scotia	Canada	
28	10-19 Sept	2010	Radial & Full	Hayling Island Sailing Club	Hayling Island	United Kingdom	
29	5-13 Aug	2011	Radial & Full	St. Francis Yacht Club	San Francisco	United States	
30	9-17 Mar	2012	4.7, Radial & Full	Royal Queensland Yacht Squadron	Brisbane	Australia	
31	28 Nov to 7 Dec	2013	4.7, Radial & Full	Al Musannah Sports City	Musannah	Oman	
32	3-11 Sept	2014	4.7, Radial & Full	Circle Organization Yachting Competition Hyèrois	Hyères	France	
33	10–18 July	2015	Radial & Full	Portsmouth Olympic Harbour	Kingston, Ontario	Canada	
34	22-30 Apr	2016	Radial & Full	Vallarta Yacht Club	Vallarta	Mexico	
35	21-30 Sept	2017	Radial & Full	Sailing Club Mornar	Split	Croatia	
36	7-15 Sept	2018	Radial & Full	Royal St. George Yacht Club / National Yacht Club	Dun Laoghaire	Ireland	
37	8-14 Sept	2019	Radial & Full		Port Zélande	Netherlands	
N/A	19 Mar to 28 Apr	2020	Radial & Full	Royal Geelong Yacht Club	Geelong	Australia	
38	11-20 Nov	2021	6 / 7	Barcelona International Sailing Center	Barcelona	Spain	
39	18-26 Feb	2022	6 / 7	Vallarta Yacht Club	Riviera Nayarit	Mexico	
40	8-16 Feb	2023	6 / 7	Royal Varuna Yacht Club	Pattaya	Thailand	
41	2-10 Feb	2024	6 / 7	Adelaide Sailing Club	Adelaide	Australia	
42	19-28 Sept	2025	6 / 7	Circolo Nautico Caposele	Formia	Italy	
43	30 May - 16 June	2026	6 / 7	Nautical Club of Kalamaki		Greece	

== Multiple World Champions ==
Compiled from the data below the table includes up to and including 2025.

Ranking	Sailor	Gold	Silver	Bronze	Total	No. Entries*	Ref.
1	Brett Beyer (AUS)	17	4	1	22	22	
2	Keith Wilkins (GBR)	13	3	3	19	21	
3	Peter Seidenberg (USA)	11	9	4	24	35	
4	Mark Bethwaite (AUS)	9	4	2	15	20	
5	Scott Leith (NZL)	8	3	1	11	13	
6	Jon Emmett (GBR)	8	1	1	10	10	
7	William Symes (USA)	6	6	0	12	19	
8	Stephen Cockerill (GBR)	6	4	1	11	12	
9	Allan Clark (CAN)	6	1	1	8	16	
10	Wolfgang Gerz (GER)	5	3	1	9	18	
11	Colin Lovelady (AUS)	5	2	2	9	15	
12	Adonis Bougiouris (GRE)	5	2	2	9	9	
13	Jeff Loosemore (AUS)	4	2	2	8	14	
14	Mark Orams (NZL)	4	1	0	5	5	
15	Alan Clark (AUS)	4	0	1	5	5	
16	Peter Heywood (AUS)	4	0	0	4	13	

== Winner ==
Event				World Champion	Participation					Ref.
Year	Rig	Gender	Age	World Champion	No.	Nat.	Cont.			Ref.
1980	Full / 7	Open	Apprentice	Svend Calsen (DEN)						
1980	Full / 7	Open	Master	Nick Paine (GBR)						
1980	Full / 7	Open	Grand Masters+	Sam Small (USA)						
1981	Full / 7	Open	Apprentice	Jacky Nebrel (FRA)						
1981	Full / 7	Open	Master	Nick Paine (GBR)						
1981	Full / 7	Open	Grand Masters+	Alan Clark (AUS)						
1982	Full / 7	Open	Apprentice	Paul Millsom (AUS)						
1982	Full / 7	Open	Master	Hans-Luther Striewe (GER)						
1982	Full / 7	Open	Grand Masters+	Alan Clark (AUS)						
1983	Full / 7	Open	Apprentice	Tucker Bragdon (USA)						
1983	Full / 7	Open	Master	Norman Freeman (USA)						
1983	Full / 7	Open	Grand Masters+	Alan Clark (AUS)						
1984	Full / 7	Open	Apprentice	Richard Verco (AUS)						
1984	Full / 7	Open	Master	John Rigg (AUS)						
1984	Full / 7	Open	Grand Masters+	Alex Mcclure (AUS)						
1985	Full / 7	Open	Apprentice	David Olsen						
1985	Full / 7	Open	Master	Peter Seidenberg (USA)						
1985	Full / 7	Open	Grand Masters+	Alex Mcclure (AUS)						
1987	Full / 7	Open	Apprentice	Phil Peglar (AUS)						
1987	Full / 7	Open	Master	John Rigg (AUS)						
1987	Full / 7	Open	Grand Masters+	Alan Clark (AUS)						
1988	Full / 7	Open	Apprentice	Jeff Loosemore (AUS)						
1988	Full / 7	Open	Master	Peter Seidenberg (USA)						
1988	Full / 7	Open	Grand Masters+	Friedhelm Lixenfeld (GER)						
1989	Full / 7	Open	Apprentice	Keith Wilkins (GBR)						
1989	Full / 7	Open	Master	John Rigg (AUS)						
1989	Full / 7	Open	Grand Masters+	Friedhelm Lixenfeld (GER)						
1990	Full / 7	Open	Apprentice	Kim Zetterberg (USA)						
1990	Full / 7	Open	Master	Friedhelm Lixenfeld (GER)						
1990	Full / 7	Open	Grand Masters+	Denis O'Sullivan (IRL)						
1991	Full / 7	Open	Apprentice	Stephen Birbeck (GBR)						
1991	Full / 7	Open	Master	Keith Wilkins (GBR)						
1991	Full / 7	Open	Grand Masters+	Colin Lovelady (AUS)						
1993	Full / 7	Open	Apprentice	Paul Page (NZL)						
1993	Full / 7	Open	Master	Keith Wilkins (GBR)						
1993	Full / 7	Open	Grand Masters	Colin Lovelady (AUS)						
1993	Full / 7	Open	Great Grand Masters	Doug Bates (NZL)						
1994	Full / 7	Open	Apprentice	Norio Akiyama (JPN)						
1994	Full / 7	Open	Master	Keith Wilkins (GBR)						
1994	Full / 7	Open	Grand Masters+	Colin Lovelady (AUS)						
1995	Full / 7	Open	Apprentice	Nicholas Harrison (GBR)						
1995	Full / 7	Open	Master	Keith Wilkins (GBR)						
1995	Full / 7	Open	Grand Masters+	Colin Lovelady (AUS)						
1996	Radial / 6	Open	Apprentice	Adam French (AUS)						
1996	Full / 7	Open	Apprentice	Peter Wilson (RSA)						
1996	Full / 7	Open	Master	Keith Wilkins (GBR)						
1996	Full / 7	Open	Grand Masters+	Ben Piefke (AUS)						
1997	Radial / 6	Open	Apprentice	Wilmar Groenendiyk (NED)						
1997	Full / 7	Open	Apprentice	Cristian Herman (CHI)						
1997	Full / 7	Open	Master	Doug Peckover (USA)						
1997	Full / 7	Open	Grand Masters+	Colin Lovelady (AUS)						
1998	NOT HELD									
1999	Radial / 6	Open	Apprentice / Masters / Grand Masters	Mark Orams (NZL)	66	14	6	55	11	
1999	Radial / 6	Open	Great Grand Masters / Legends	Graham Read (AUS)	13	8	6	13	0	
1999	Full / 7	Open	Apprentice	Mark Littlejohn (GBR)	62	12	4			
1999	Full / 7	Open	Masters	Keith Wilkins (GBR)	71	13	5			
1999	Full / 7	Open	Grand Masters / Legends	Graham Oborn (AUS)	39	10	3			
2000	Radial / 6	Open	All	Adam French (AUS)	28	12	5			
2000	Full / 7	Open	Apprentice	Alan Davis (GBR)	36	13	4			
2000	Full / 7	Open	Masters	Mark Bethwaite (AUS)	46	15	5			
2000	Full / 7	Open	Grand Masters	Keith Wilkins (GBR)	35	15	5			
2000	Full / 7	Open	Great Grand Masters	Henry De Wolf Jnr. (USA)	15	9	5			
2001	Radial / 6	Open	All	Stephen Cockerill (GBR)	83	17	6	66	17	
2001	Full / 7	Open	Apprentice	Brett Beyer (AUS)	91	18	5			
2001	Full / 7	Open	Masters	Colin Dibb (AUS)	70	17	6			
2001	Full / 7	Open	Grand Masters	Keith Wilkins (GBR)	71	13	4			
2002	Radial / 6	Open	Apprentice	Stephen Cockerill (GBR)	22	8	3			
2002	Radial / 6	Open	Masters	Adam French (AUS)	16	7	4			
2002	Radial / 6	Open	Grand Masters	Lindsay Hewitt (USA)	10	4	3			
2002	Radial / 6	Open	Great Grand Masters & Legends	Dick Tillman (USA)	18	7	4			
2002	Full / 7	Open	Apprentice	Andreas John (GER)	67	14	5			
2002	Full / 7	Open	Masters	Ed Adams (USA)	75	15	5			
2002	Full / 7	Open	Great Grand Masters & Legends	Keith Wilkins (GBR)	64	12	4			
2003	Radial / 6	Open	Apprentice	Wilmar Groenendijk (NED)	12	11	5	8	4	
2003	Radial / 6	Open	Masters	Alastair Mcmichael (AUS)	25	9	4	22	3	
2003	Radial / 6	Open	Grand Masters	Alden Shattuck (USA)	10	7	3			
2003	Radial / 6	Open	Great Grand Masters & Legends	Peter Seidenberg (USA)	23	10	5			
2003	Full / 7	Open	Apprentice	Mark Littlejohn (GBR)	67	20	6			
2003	Full / 7	Open	Masters	Anders Sörensson (SWE)	56	18	6			
2003	Full / 7	Open	Great Grand Masters & Legends	Mark Bethwaite (AUS)	44	16	4			
2004	Radial / 6	Open	Apprentice	David Early (HKG)	8	6	3	6	2	
2004	Radial / 6	Open	Masters	Goran Bonacic (CRO)	16	9	3	13	3	
2004	Radial / 6	Open	Grand Masters	Poopy Marcon (FRA)	14	9	5	14	0	
2004	Radial / 6	Open	Great Grand Masters & Legends	Peter Seidenberg (USA)	24	12	5	24	0	
2004	Full / 7	Open	Apprentice	Brett Beyer (AUS)	25	16	6	24	1	
2004	Full / 7	Open	Masters	Colin Dibb (AUS)	31	15	3	31	0	
2004	Full / 7	Open	Great Grand Masters & Legends	Mark Bethwaite (AUS)	36	12	4	35	1	
2005	Radial / 6	Open	Apprentice	Mark Orams (NZL)	17	10	5	15	2	
2005	Radial / 6	Open	Masters	Alexander Nikolaev (RUS)	20	8	4	17	3	
2005	Radial / 6	Open	Grand Masters	Peter Heywood (AUS)	18	9	4	17	1	
2005	Radial / 6	Open	Great Grand Masters & Legends	Kerry Waraker (AUS)	25	13	6	25	0	
2005	Full / 7	Open	Apprentice	Brett Beyer (AUS)	20	13	5	19	1	
2005	Full / 7	Open	Masters	Murray Thom (NZL)	52	19	6	51	0	
2005	Full / 7	Open	Great Grand Masters & Legends	Mark Bethwaite (AUS)	29	9	4	29	0	
2006	Radial / 6	Open	Masters Combined	Stephen Cockerill (GBR)	39	8	4	34	5	
2006	Full / 7	Open	Masters Combined	Brett Beyer (AUS)	33	13	4	33	0	
2007	Radial / 6	Open	Apprentice	Mark Page (NZL)	34	11	3	26	8	
2007	Radial / 6	Open	Masters	Greg Adams (AUS)	44	12	4	35	9	
2007	Radial / 6	Open	Grand Masters	Peter Heywood (AUS)	28	7	5	26	2	
2007	Radial / 6	Open	Great Grand Masters & Legends	Peter Seidenberg (USA)	53	19	5	52	1	
2007	Full / 7	Open	Apprentice	Brett Beyer (AUS)	59	17	5	59	0	
2007	Full / 7	Open	Masters	Arnoud Hummel (NED)	107	25	6	41	0	
2007	Full / 7	Open	Great Grand Masters & Legends	Mark Bethwaite (AUS)	75	19	5	60	0	
2008	Radial / 6	Open	Apprentice	James Liebl (USA)	30	6	3	23	7	
2008	Radial / 6	Open	Masters	Mark Orams (NZL)	48	7	3	37	11	
2008	Radial / 6	Open	Grand Masters	Peter Heywood (AUS)	33	7	4	32	1	
2008	Radial / 6	Open	Great Grand Masters & Legends	Peter Seidenberg (USA)	30	8	4	30	0	
2008	Full / 7	Open	Apprentice	Brett Beyer (AUS)	50	8	4	50	0	
2008	Full / 7	Open	Masters	Jan Scholten (AUS)	90	6	3	90	0	
2008	Full / 7	Open	Great Grand Masters & Legends	Mark Bethwaite (AUS)	54	8	3	54	0	
2009	Radial / 6	Open	Apprentice	Richard Bott (AUS)	14	6	3	9	5	
2009	Radial / 6	Open	Masters	Carlos Eduardo Wanderley (BRA)	36	12	5	29	7	
2009	Radial / 6	Open	Grand Masters	Peter Heywood (AUS)	26	9	6	24	2	
2009	Radial / 6	Open	Great Grand Masters & Legends	Peter Seidenberg (USA)	41	12	5			
2009	Full / 7	Open	Apprentice	Adonis Bougiouris (GRE)	36	13	4			
2009	Full / 7	Open	Masters	Scott Ferguson (USA)	83	17	6			
2009	Full / 7	Open	Great Grand Masters & Legends	Wolfgang Gerz (GER)	39	11	5			
2010	Radial / 6	Open	Apprentice	Scott Leith (NZL)	23	11	4	18	5	
2010	Radial / 6	Open	Masters	Stephen Cockerill (GBR)	55	15	5	41	14	
2010	Radial / 6	Open	Grand Masters	Lyndall Patterson (AUS)	31	8	5	29	2	
2010	Radial / 6	Open	Great Grand Masters & Legends	Keith Wilkins (GBR)	42	19	6	40	2	
2010	Full / 7	Open	Apprentice	Brett Beyer (AUS)	38	19	5	38	0	
2010	Full / 7	Open	Masters	Scott Ferguson (USA)	84	19	4	84	0	
2010	Full / 7	Open	Grand Masters	Wolfgang Gerz (GER)	55	16	5	55	0	
2011	Radial / 6	Open	Apprentice	Scott Leith (NZL)	19	6	4	15	4	
2011	Radial / 6	Open	Masters	Allan Clark (CAN)	36	12	4	34	2	
2011	Radial / 6	Open	Grand Masters	William Symes (USA)	24	9	5	21	3	
2011	Radial / 6	Open	Great Grand Masters & Legends	Keith Wilkins (GBR)	30	10	3	30	0	
2011	Full / 7	Open	Apprentice	Benjamin Richardson (USA)	25	9	4	25	0	
2011	Full / 7	Open	Masters	Arnoud Hummel (NED)	54	20	5	54	0	
2011	Full / 7	Open	Grand Masters	Colin Dibb (AUS)	30	10	5	27	0	
2012	4.7 / 4	Open	Masters	Claire Heenan (AUS)	12	3	3	6	6	
2012	Radial / 6	Open	Apprentice	Scott Leith (NZL)	17	5	3	12	5	
2012	Radial / 6	Open	Masters	Mark Orams (NZL)	39	10	6	33	6	
2012	Radial / 6	Open	Grand Masters	Michael Keeton (NZL)	36	7	5	34	2	
2012	Radial / 6	Open	Great Grand Masters & Legends	Kerry Waraker (AUS)	34	8	4	33	1	
2012	Full / 7	Open	Apprentice	Matias Del Solar (CHI)	19	3	2	19	0	
2012	Full / 7	Open	Masters	Brett Beyer (AUS)	40	9	4	40	0	
2012	Full / 7	Open	Grand Masters	Wolfgang Gerz (GER)	36	10	5	36	0	
2013	Radial / 6	Open	Apprentice	Jon Emmett (GBR)	11	7	5			
2013	Radial / 6	Open	Masters	Ian Jones (GBR)	15	9	3			
2013	Radial / 6	Open	Grand Masters	Vanessa Dudley (AUS)	23	9	4			
2013	Radial / 6	Open	Great Grand Masters & Legends	Peter Seidenberg (USA)	38	14	5			
2013	Full / 7	Open	Great Grand Masters & Legends	Scott Leith (NZL)	18	12	5			
2013	Full / 7	Open	Apprentice	Allan Clark (CAN)	30	17	5			
2013	Full / 7	Open	Masters	Greg Adams (AUS)	39	16	5			
2013	Full / 7	Open	Grand Masters	Mark Bethwaite (AUS)	10	5	3			
2014	4.7 / 4	Open	Masters	Stephen Walsh (AUT)	4	3	2			
2014	Radial / 6	Open	Apprentice	Jon Emmett (GBR)	25	14	4			
2014	Radial / 6	Open	Masters	Stephen Cockerill (GBR)	73	14	5			
2014	Radial / 6	Open	Grand Masters	Michael Keeton (NZL)	70	16	4			
2014	Radial / 6	Open	Great Grand Masters & Legends	Keith Wilkins (GBR)	77	20	6			
2014	Full / 7	Open	Apprentice	Adonis Bougiouris (GRE)	38	18	4			
2014	Full / 7	Open	Masters	Brett Beyer (AUS)	116	24	5			
2014	Full / 7	Open	Grand Masters	Nick Harrison (GBR)	87	19	6			
2015	Radial / 6	Open	Apprentice	Scott Leith (NZL)	13	6	3	9	4	
2015	Radial / 6	Open	Masters	Keith Davids (USA)	16	6	4	9	7	
2015	Radial / 6	Open	Grand Masters	Allan Clark (CAN)	36	9	5	34	2	
2015	Radial / 6	Open	Great Grand Masters	Robert Lowndes (AUS)	32	6	4	31	1	
2015	Radial / 6	Open	Legends	Peter Seidenberg (USA)	12	10	4	11	1	
2015	Full / 7	Open	Apprentice	Adonis Bougiouris (GRE)	17	6	3	17	0	
2015	Full / 7	Open	Masters	Brett Beyer (AUS)	50	14	5	50	0	
2015	Full / 7	Open	Grand Masters	Peter Shope (USA)	55	11	5	54	1	
2015	Full / 7	Open	Great Grand Masters & Legends	Mark Bethwaite (AUS)	16	7	5	16	0	
2016	Radial / 6	Open	Apprentice	Scott Leith (NZL)	15	5	4			
2016	Radial / 6	Open	Masters	Carlos Eduardo Wanderley (BRA)	29	13	5			
2016	Radial / 6	Open	Grand Masters	Robert Lowndes (AUS)	36	10	5			
2016	Radial / 6	Open	Great Grand Masters	Vanessa Dudley (AUS)	49	12	5			
2016	Radial / 6	Open	Legend	Peter Seidenberg (USA)	8	4	3			
2016	Full / 7	Open	Apprentice	Pablo Rabago (MEX)	5	2	1			
2016	Full / 7	Open	Masters	Brett Beyer (AUS)	28	13	4			
2016	Full / 7	Open	Grand Masters	Gavin Dagley (AUS)	39	12	5			
2016	Full / 7	Open	Great Grand Masters & Legends	Mark Bethwaite (AUS)	13	7	4			
2017	Radial / 6	Open	Apprentice	Jon Emmett (GBR)	12	10	4	6	6	
2017	Radial / 6	Open	Masters	Alessio Marinelli (ITA)	37	18	5	25	12	
2017	Radial / 6	Open	Grand Masters	Martin White (AUS)	63	18	5	53	10	
2017	Radial / 6	Open	Great Grand Masters & Legends	William Symes (USA)	62	19	5	59	3	
2017	Full / 7	Open	Apprentice	Maciej Grabowski (POL)	15	11	4	15	0	
2017	Full / 7	Open	Masters	Brett Beyer (AUS)	69	22	5			
2017	Full / 7	Open	Grand Masters	Allan Clark (CAN)	68	20	5			
2017	Full / 7	Open	Great Grand Masters & Legends	Michael Nissen (GER)	21	11	5			
2018	Radial / 6	Open	Apprentice	Ben Elvin (GBR)	6	2	1	5	1	
2018	Radial / 6	Open	Masters	Scott Leith (NZL)	28	14	5	23	5	
2018	Radial / 6	Open	Grand Masters	Stephen Cockerill (GBR)	57	16	5	50	7	
2018	Radial / 6	Open	Great Grand Masters & Legends	William Symes (USA)	37	11	5	36	1	
2018	Full / 7	Open	Apprentice	Leandro Rosado (ESP)	14	7	2	14	0	
2018	Full / 7	Open	Masters	Brett Beyer (AUS)	62	18	3			
2018	Full / 7	Open	Grand Masters	Mark Lyttle (GBR)	67	14	4			
2018	Full / 7	Open	Great Grand Masters & Legends	Wolfgang Gerz (GER)	15	8	4	15	0	
2019	Radial / 6	Open	Apprentice	Jon Emmett (GBR)	10	8	1	5	5	
2019	Radial / 6	Open	Masters	Scott Leith (NZL)	40	16	4	29	11	
2019	Radial / 6	Open	Grand Masters	Gilles Coadou (FRA)	55	16	4	44	11	
2019	Radial / 6	Open	Great Grand Masters	Jeff Loosemore (AUS)	28	9	3	27	1	
2019	Radial / 6	Open	Legends	Kerry Waraker (AUS)	12	5	3	12	0	
2019	Full / 7	Open	Apprentice	Dave Ridley (NZL)	22	11	4			
2019	Full / 7	Open	Masters	Serge Kats (NED)	62	16	3			
2019	Full / 7	Open	Grand Masters	Carlos Martinez (ESP)	55	13	3			
2019	Full / 7	Open	Great Grand Masters & Legends	Wolfgang Gerz (GER)	12	6	3	12	0	
2020	CANCELLED DUE TO COVID									
2021	Radial / 6	Open	Apprentice	Jon Emmett (GBR)	12	6	3	9	3	
2021	Radial / 6	Open	Masters	Stefan Eriksson (SWE)	48	16	3	44	4	
2021	Radial / 6	Open	Grand Masters	Gilles Coadou (FRA)	47	13	3	39	8	
2021	Radial / 6	Open	Great Grand Masters	William Symes (USA)	18	9	3	17	1	
2021	Radial / 6	Open	Legends	Peter Seidenberg (USA)	8	4	2	8	0	
2021	Full / 7	Open	Apprentice	Wannes Van Laer (BEL)	13	8	2	13	0	
2021	Full / 7	Open	Masters	Ernesto Rodriguez (USA)	31	14	4	31	0	
2021	Full / 7	Open	Grand Masters	Robert Hallawell (USA)	41	18	4	41	0	
2021	Full / 7	Open	Great Grand Masters & Legends	Jose Luis Doreste (ESP)	11	8	4	11	0	
2022	Radial / 6	Open	Apprentice	Jon Emmett (GBR)	9	4	3	5	4	
2022	Radial / 6	Open	Masters	Ian Gregory (GBR)	12	5	3	10	2	
2022	Radial / 6	Open	Grand Masters	Allan Clark (CAN)	24	9	5	23	1	
2022	Radial / 6	Open	Great Grand Masters	Jeff Loosemore (AUS)	20	8	4	20	0	
2022	Radial / 6	Open	Legends	Chris Boome (USA)	10	4	3	10	0	
2022	Full / 7	Open	Apprentice	Andres Heredia (ARG)	5	5	4	5	0	
2022	Full / 7	Open	Masters	Adonis Bougiouris (GRE)	14	8	4	14	0	
2022	Full / 7	Open	Grand Masters	Brett Beyer (AUS)	24	9	4	24	0	
2022	Full / 7	Open	Great Grand Masters & Legends	Tim Law (GBR)	18	6	4	18	0	
2023	Radial / 6	Open	Apprentice	Viktorija Andrulyte (LTU)	9	8	4	5	4	
2023	Radial / 6	Open	Masters	Jon Emmett (GBR)	14	11	5	10	4	
2023	Radial / 6	Open	Grand Masters	Allan Clark (CAN)	42	14	5	34	8	
2023	Radial / 6	Open	Great Grand Masters	Jeff Loosemore (AUS)	32	12	5	31	1	
2023	Radial / 6	Open	Legends	William Symes (USA)	20	5	4	20	0	
2023	Full / 7	Open	Apprentice	Keerati Bualong (THA)	5	4	2	5	0	
2023	Full / 7	Open	Masters	Adonis Bougiouris (GRE)	19	12	5	18	1	
2023	Full / 7	Open	Grand Masters	Brett Beyer (AUS)	38	13	5	37	1	
2023	Full / 7	Open	Great Grand Masters & Legends	Tim Law (GBR)	23	11	5	23	0	
2024	Radial / 6	Open	Apprentice	Franco Riquelme Antonetti (ARG)	9	8	4	5	4	
2024	Radial / 6	Open	Masters	Simon Small (AUS)	21	6	3	19	2	
2024	Radial / 6	Open	Grand Masters	Andrew Holdsworth (USA)	45	9	5	39	6	
2024	Radial / 6	Open	Great Grand Masters	James Mitchell (AUS)	43	8	4	41	2	
2024	Radial / 6	Open	Legends	William Symes (USA)	19	3	2	19	0	
2024	Full / 7	Open	Apprentice	Luke Deegan (NZL)	12	7	3	12	0	
2024	Full / 7	Open	Masters	Brendan Casey (AUS)	19	4	3	19	0	
2024	Full / 7	Open	Grand Masters	Brett Beyer (AUS)	35	9	3	35	0	
2024	Full / 7	Open	Great Grand Masters & Legends	Steve Gunther (AUS)	19	7	5	19	0	
2025	Radial / 6	Open	Apprentice	Marcin Rudawski (POL)	23	9	4	14	9	
2025	Radial / 6	Open	Masters	Jon Emmett (GBR)	34	14	5	24	10	
2025	Radial / 6	Open	Grand Masters	Carlos Martinez (ESP)	92	17	4	77	15	
2025	Radial / 6	Open	Great Grand Masters	Gilles Coadou (FRA)	73	22	4	62	11	
2025	Radial / 6	Open	Legends	Robert Lowndes (AUS)	30	16	5	30	0	
2025	Full / 7	Open	Apprentice	Matej Valic (SLO)	20	13	4	20	0	
2025	Full / 7	Open	Masters	Bruno Fontes (BRA)	38	16	4	38	0	
2025	Full / 7	Open	Grand Masters	Brett Beyer (AUS)	91	20	4	91	0	
2025	Full / 7	Open	Great Grand Masters & Legends	Jose Luis Doreste (ESP)	44	19	5	44	0	
2026	Radial / 6	Open	Apprentice	Marcin Rudawski (POL)	15	9	4	7	8	
2026	Radial / 6	Open	Masters	Jon Emmett (GBR)	20	9	5	13	7	
2026	Radial / 6	Open	Grand Masters	Robert Hallawell (USA)	47	16	6	35	12	
2026	Radial / 6	Open	Great Grand Masters	Kim Tan (NED)	15	7	4	14	1	
2026	Radial / 6	Open	Legends	William Symes (USA)	18	9	4	18	0	
2026	Radial / 6	Open	Super Legends	Kerry Waraker (AUS)	3	2	2	3	0	
2026	Full / 7	Open	Apprentice	Mihalis Koulianos (GRE)	8	5	3	5	0	
2026	Full / 7	Open	Masters	Adonis Bougiouris (GRE)	12	5	2	12	0	
2026	Full / 7	Open	Grand Masters	Mark Lyttle (GBR)	33	13	3	33	0	
2026	Full / 7	Open	Great Grand Masters	Allan Clark (CAN)	27	11	4	27	0	
2026	Full / 7	Open	Legends	Greg Jackson (USA)	4	2	2	4	0	

== See also ==
- Youth Sailing World Championships
- IYRU Women's Sailing World Championships

== See also - Class Events ==
- ILCA Main Worlds
  - Men's ILCA 6 World Championship
  - Women's ILCA 6 World Championship
  - Open ILCA 7 World Championship No Longer Held
  - Male ILCA 7 World Championship
- ILCA Age Related Worlds
  - Male Under 18 ILCA 4 World Championships
  - Female Under 18 ILCA 4 World Championships
  - Open Youth ILCA 6 World Championships No Longer Held
  - Male Youth ILCA 6 World Championships
  - Female Youth ILCA 6 World Championships
  - Female Under 21 ILCA 6 World Championships
  - Male Under 21 ILCA 7 World Championships
  - Open Over 30,45,55,65,75 ILCA Masters World Championships
- None Class Worlds
  - Youth Sailing World Championships
  - World Sailing Inclusion Championships
