= Men's ILCA 6 World Championship =

The Men's ILCA 6 World Championship, until 2020 the Men's Laser Radial World Championship, has been held every year since 1989 for the ILCA 6 class, organised by the host club on behalf of the International Laser Class Association (ILCA) and recognised by World Sailing. Laser Radial is an Olympic sailing class. The event was held together with the Women's Laser Radial World Championship between 1989 and 2010.

== Editions ==
Event			Host			Sailor				Ref.
Ed.	Date	Year	Host club	City	Country			Nat.	Cont.	Ref.
1		1989		Aarhus	Denmark	58		17		
2		1990		Newport	United States					
3		1991		Porto Carras	Greece					
NOT HELD
4		1993		Takapuna	New Zealand					
5		1994		Wakayama	Japan					
6		1995		Tenerife	Spain					
7	23–30 April	1996		Simon's Town	South Africa					
8	20–26 July	1997		Mohammedia	Morocco					
9	3-8 Aug	1998	Royal Yacht Club Hollandia	Medemblik	Netherlands					
10	2–17 July	1999	Societe des Regates Rochelaises	La Rochelle, Charente-Maritime	France					
11	22–29 July	2000		Çeşme	Turkey					
12	13-20 Jul	2001	Club Nautico Vilanova	Vilanova, Barcelona	Spain					
13	21-27 Jul	2002	Buffalo Canoe Club	Fort Erie, Ontario	Canada					
14	26Jul -1Aug	2003	Fraglia Vela Riva	Riva del Garda	Italy					
15	1-8 Apr	2004	Royal Queensland Yacht Squadron	Manly, Brisbane, Queensland	Australia					
16	2-9 Dec	2005	Iate Clube de Fortaleza	Fortaleza, Ceará	Brazil					
17	28Jul -4Aug	2006	California Yacht Club	Marina del Rey, California	United States					
18	4-11 Aug	2007		Scheveningen	Netherlands					
19	24-29 Mar	2008	Takapuna Boating Club	Takapuna, Auckland	New Zealand					
20	3-10 Aug	2009		Karatsu	Japan					
21	17-25 Jul	2010	Largs Sailing Club	Largs	United Kingdom	92	N/A	27	5	
22	16-23 Jul	2011	Societe des Regates Rochelaises	La Rochelle, Charente-Maritime	France	130	N/A	34	6	
23	10-17 Jul	2012	Royal Queensland Yacht Squadron	Manly, Brisbane, Queensland	Australia	51	N/A	9	5	
24	30Aug -6Sep	2013	Royal St George Yacht Club; National Yacht Club	Dún Laoghaire	Ireland		N/A			
25	19-25 Jul	2014		Dziwnów	Poland	76	N/A	22	5	
26	17-24 Jul	2015		Aahus	Denmark	75	N/A	22	4	
27	23-30 Jul	2016	Royal St George Yacht Club; National Yacht Club	Dún Laoghaire	Ireland	42	N/A	18	5	
28	19-26 Aug	2017	Royal Yacht Club Hollandia, Regatta Centre	Medemblik	Netherlands	63	N/A	28	6	
29	18-24 Jun	2018	Kieler Yacht Club; Part of Kieler Woche	Kiel	Germany	92	N/A	25	4	
30	17-24 Jul	2019		Sakaiminato-City	Japan	32	N/A	5	4	
31	21-28 Feb	2020	Sandringham Yacht Club	Sandringham, Victoria	Australia	66	N/A	13	5	
32	29Nov -6Dec	2021	Al Musannah Sports City	Al Musannah	Oman	9	N/A	5	2	
33	9-16 Oct	2022	Texas Corinthian Yacht Club	Kemah	United States	14	N/A	3	2	
34	1-9 Jul	2023	Gmina Dziwnow	Dziwnów	Poland	15	N/A	12	4	
35	12-19 Jan	2024	Yacht Club Argentino: Mar del Plata	Mar del Plata	Argentina	51	N/A	8	3	
36	20-25 Jun	2025/26	Kieler Yacht Club	Kiel, Schleswig-Holstein	Germany	124	N/A	28	4	
37	25Sep -2Oct	2026	Capable Planet Clube Náutico	Vilamoura	Portugal	60	N/A	18	3	
38	23-20 Aug	2027	Nautical Club of Volos & Argonauts	Volos	Greece					

== Open Medalists ==
Year	Gold	Silver	Bronze	1st-Female	Ref.
1989 Aarhus	James Johnstone (USA)	Dimitrios Theodorakis (GRE)	Jeff Loosemore (AUS)	**	
1990 Newport	Peter Katcha (USA)	John Bonds (USA)	Scott Cheney (USA)	**	
1991 Porto Carras	Stewart Casey (AUS)	Maria Vlachou (GRE)	John Karageorgis (GRE)	**	
1993 Takapuna	Ben Ainslie (GBR)	Dan Slater (NZL)	Allan Coutts (NZL)	**	
1994 Wakayama	Rui Pedro Coelho (POR)	Rodion Luka (UKR)	Nathan Handley (NZL)	**	
1995 Tenerife	Brendan Casey (AUS)	Tim Shuwalow (AUS)	Gustavo Lima (POR)	**	
1996 Simon's Town	Brendan Casey (AUS)	Andrey Kirilyuk (RUS)	Allan Coutts (NZL)	27th / Jacqueline Ellis (AUS)	

== Male Medalists ==
Year	Gold	Silver	Bronze	Ref.
1997 Mohemida	Raimondas Šiugždinis (LTU)	Romain Knipping (FRA)	Selim Kakış (TUR)	
1998 Medemblik	Gustavo Lima (POR)	Andonis Bougiouris (GRE)	Alexandros Logothetis (GRE)	
1999 La Rochelle	Andonis Bougiouris (GRE)	Gustavo Lima (POR)	Teddy Questroy (FRA)	
2000 Cesme	Fredrik Lassenius (SWE)	Alexandros Logothetis (GRE)	Vangelis Chimonas (GRE)	
2001 Vilanova	Michael Bullot (NZL)	Andre Streppel (BRA)	Aron Lolic (CRO)	
2002 Buffalo	Karlo Krpeljevic (CRO)	Chris Ashley (USA)	Tiago Rodriques (BRA)	
2003 Lake Garda	Aron Lolic (CRO)	Jake Bartrom (NZL)	Karlo Krpeljevic (CRO)	
2004 Manly	Michael Blackburn (AUS)	Aron Lolic (CRO)	Tom Slingsby (AUS)	
2005 Fortaleza	Eduardo Couto (BRA)	Brad Funk (USA)	Blair Mclay (NZL)	
2006 Los Angeles	Fábio Pillar (BRA)	Steven Le Fevre (NED)	Steven Krol (NED)	
2007 Scheveningen	Ben Paton (GBR)	Eduardo Vianen (NED)	Steven Krol (NED)	
2008 Auckland	Mike Leigh (CAN)	Brad Funk (USA)	Simon Morgan (AUS)	
2009 Karatsu	Marcin Rudawski (POL)	Ben Koppelaar (NED)	Kim In-sub (NED)	
2010 Largs	Marcin Rudawski (POL)	Wojciech Zemke (POL)	Mitchell Kiss (USA)	
2011 La Rochelle	Marcin Rudawski (POL)	James Burman (AUS)	Yuri Hummel (NED)	
2012 Brisbane	Tristan Brown (AUS)	Matthew Wearn (AUS)	Jeremy OConnell (AUS)	
2013 Dun Laoghaire	Tristan Brown (AUS)	Marcin Rudawski (POL)	Finn Lynch (IRL)	
2014 Dziwnów	Jonasz Stelmaszyk (POL)	Marcin Rudawski (POL)	William De Smet (BEL)	
2015 Aarhus	Marcin Rudawski (POL)	Matthias Van de Loock (BEL)	Žan Luka Zelko (SLO)	
2016 Dún Laoghaire	Marcin Rudawski (POL)	Nik Pletikos (SLO)	Martin Manzoli Lowy (BRA)	
2017 Medemblik	Marcin Rudawski (POL)	Eliot Merceron (SUI)	Zac Littlewood (AUS)	
2018 Kiel	Zac Littlewood (AUS)	Aleksander Arian (POL)	Caelin Winchcombe (AUS)	
2019 Sakaiminato	Simon de Gendt (BEL)	Zac West (AUS)	Guilherme Perez (BRA)	
2020 Melbourne	Daniil Krutskikh (RUS)	Michael Compton (AUS)	Nik Pletikos (SLO)	
2021 Al-Musannah	Nik Pletikos (SLO)	Al Muatasem Al Farsi (OMA)	Abdul Malik Al Hinai (OMA)	
2022 Kemah	Peter Barnard (USA)	William Baker (USA)	Hamilton Barclay (USA)	
2023 Dziwnów	George Lane (NZL)	Nikola Golubović (MNE)	Jon Emmett (GBR)	
2024 Mar del Plata	Francisco Renna (ARG)	Juan Pablo Bisio (ARG)	Antonio Cavalcanti (BRA)	
2025 Kiel	Alessandro Cirinei (ITA)	Nicoló Cassitta (ITA)	Semen Khashchyna (UKR)	
2026 Vilamoura	Francisco Dal Ri (BRA)	Erik Scheidt (BRA)	Bepo Duplančić (CRO)	

== Multiple medalists ==
Rank	Athlete	Nation	Gold	Silver	Bronze	Total
1	Marcin Rudawski	Poland	6	2	0	8
2	Nik Pletikos	Slovenia	1	1	1	3
2	Aron Lolic	Croatia	1	1	1	3

== See also ==
- ISAF Sailing World Championships
- Youth Sailing World Championships

== See also - Class Events ==
- ILCA Main Worlds
  - Men's ILCA 6 World Championship
  - Women's ILCA 6 World Championship
  - Open ILCA 7 World Championship No Longer Held
  - Male ILCA 7 World Championship
- ILCA Age Related Worlds
  - Male Under 18 ILCA 4 World Championships
  - Female Under 18 ILCA 4 World Championships
  - Open Youth ILCA 6 World Championships No Longer Held
  - Male Youth ILCA 6 World Championships
  - Female Youth ILCA 6 World Championships
  - Female Under 21 ILCA 6 World Championships
  - Male Under 21 ILCA 7 World Championships
  - Open Over 30,45,55,65,75 ILCA Masters World Championships
- None Class Worlds
  - Youth Sailing World Championships
  - World Sailing Inclusion Championships
