= 2015 ISAF Youth Sailing World Championships – Girl's Laser Radial =

Girl's Laser Radial at the 2015 ISAF Youth Sailing World Championships
- Venue: Langkawi, Malaysia
- Dates: 27 December 2015 - 3 January 2016
- Competitors: 54 from 54 nations

Medalists
gold medal	Maria Erdi	Australia
silver medal	Hannah Anderssohn	Germany
bronze medal	Magdalena Kwaśna	Poland

The girl's Laser Radial competition at the 2015 ISAF Youth Sailing World Championships took place between December 27 2015 and January 3 2016. 54 sailors from 54 nations were due to compete. Maria Erdi of Hungary won the event.

== Results ==
Pos	Helm	Country	R1	R2	R3	R4	R5	R6	R7	R8	R9	Total	Nett
1	Maria Erdi	Hungary	3	5	6	1	1	2	(23)	1	4	46	23
2	Hannah Anderssohn	Germany	4	4	3	2	5	6	(8)	2	6	40	32
3	Magdalena Kwaśna	Poland	5	1	1	3	2	10	(11)	10	9	52	41
4	Dolores Moreira Fraschini	Uruguay	2	8	5	(14)	9	3	12	3	2	58	44
5	Mirthe Akkerman	Netherlands	8	2	10	4	3	5	9	7	(11)	59	48
6	Silvia Morales Gonzales	Spain	6	3	14	6	(18)	7	5	9	1	69	51
7	Sandra Lulic	Croatia	7	11	2	8	(55 DNC)	1	7	19	8	118	63
8	Jacinta Ainsworth	Australia	13	6	12	(23)	12	13	1	6	5	91	68
9	Caroline Sofia Rosmo	Norway	9	10	(23)	12	4	11	17	8	7	101	78
10	Aisling Keller	Ireland	19	15	8	10	13	4	4	12	(32)	117	85
11	Louise Cervera	France	12	9	15	9	6	15	15	(22)	12	115	93
12	Alexandra Nightingale	New Zealand	1	19	4	5	11	18	24	29	(43)	154	111
13	Maria Carolina Knudsen Boabaid	Brazil	11	14	7	7	8	23	(25)	16	25	136	111
14	Anna Munch	Denmark	10	17	13	11	23	22	3	(25)	20	144	119
15	Cecilia Wollmann	Bermuda	16	7	11	24	15	27	6	18	(35)	159	124
16	Francesca Bergamo	Italy	23	32	(36)	25	22	8	2	11	3	162	126
17	Coralie Vittecoq	Canada	(28)	20	20	18	16	14	16	4	21	157	129
18	Christina Sakeliaris	United States	18	18	9	15	7	9	33	(34)	28	171	137
19	Nur Shazrin Mohd Latif	Malaysia	25	12	25	19	10	17	13	(26)	16	163	137
20	Carolina Joao	Portugal	14	16	18	17	19	16	22	15	(23)	160	137
21	Hanna Brant	United Kingdom	22	(33)	22	26	14	19	18	5	17	176	143
22	Suvi-Tuuli Wikstrom	Finland	17	24	19	16	24	26	14	14	(38)	192	154
23	Jarian Brandes	Peru	27	13	(33)	27	17	21	32	21	13	204	171
24	Kateryna Gumenko	Ukraine	32	(35)	24	28	20	20	21	13	15	208	173
25	Nethra Kumanan	India	21	22	16	13	28	25	29	24	(30)	208	178
26	Florence Allan	Cayman Islands	15	34	27	34	(35)	12	27	23	22	229	194
27	Jia Kim	South Korea	26	23	17	21	21	(42)	20	27	41	238	196
28	Aysenur Orhan	Turkey	31	(37)	34	30	32	30	10	32	10	246	209
29	Kristie Van Der Woude	Netherlands Antilles	20	27	21	22	27	32	31	(35)	29	244	209
30	Maria Daniela Rodriguez	Ecuador	35	29	26	(36)	26	29	28	20	27	256	220
31	Maria Castano	Argentina	(39)	21	30	35	25	24	19	39	31	263	224
32	Shione Suganuma	Japan	29	31	(41)	39	30	35	30	17	19	271	230
33	Kanapan Pachatikapanya	Thailand	36	28	(37)	33	37	28	26	30	24	279	242
34	Jacqualine Truhol	Hong Kong	24	25	32	20	34	34	38	(42)	36	285	243
35	Barbara Matz	Austria	33	26	29	38	(39)	31	34	28	33	291	252
36	Rose-Lee Numa	Papua New Guinea	(41)	39	28	32	31	40	39	33	18	301	260
37	Bianca Leilua	Samoa	34	43	38	29	29	37	(45)	37	26	318	273
38	Nouha El Alia Akil	Algeria	37	36	31	31	33	33	37	(41)	40	319	278
39	Estere Kumpina	Latvia	30	30	35	37	36	36	(40)	36	39	319	279
40	Jiayi Chua	Singapore	42	41	39	42	38	38	36	(46)	46	368	322
41	Paige Clarke	United States Virgin Islands	38	44	40	40	41	43	(50)	38	44	378	328
42	Kelly Gonzalez	Chile	40	40	(55 DNC)	55 DNC	55 DNC	55 DNC	41	31	14	386	331
43	Blanca Velasquez	Belize	45	(47)	42	43	42	45	43	43	34	384	337
44	Wen He	China	(55 OCS)	38	43	48	45	41	42	40	55 RET	407	352
45	Daniella Douglas	Turks and Caicos Islands	43	42	46	41	40	46	47	(53)	48	406	353
46	Nurul Rahma Ledha	Indonesia	(55 DNC)	55 DNC	45	44	43	39	44	44	42	411	356
47	Chou Chueh-Yu	Chinese Taipei	(55 DNC)	55 DNC	49	51	46	47	35	45	37	420	365
48	Meiling Chan Chow	Trinidad and Tobago	(55 DNF)	45	44	46	44	48	48	47	45	422	367
49	Megan Van Der Walt	South Africa	44	46	(55 DNF)	47	51	44	49	50	49	435	380
50	Domingas Huambo	Angola	(55 DNF)	48	50	45	48	50	51	48	51	446	391
51	Rwan Salama	Egypt	(55 OCS)	55 DNC	47	50	49	49	46	51	52	454	399
52	Sydney Pettitt	Vanuatu	(55 RET)	55 RET	48	49	50	51	53	49	47	457	402
53	Alison Hoareau	Seychelles	(55 DNC)	55 DNC	55 DNC	55 DNC	47	52	52	52	50	473	418
54	Paula Pelayo	Mexico	(55 DNC)	55 DNC	55 DNC	55 DNC	55 DNC	55 DNC	55 DNC	55 DNC	55 DNF	495	440
