= Schierup =

Schierup is a surname. Notable people with the surname include:

- Carl-Ulrik Schierup (born 1948), Swedish academic
- Thorbjørn Schierup (born 1990), Danish sailor
