= 2025 World Sailing Inclusion Championships =

International sailing competition

Event information
- Edition: 1st
- Host nation: Oman
- Host club: Mussanah Sailing School, Muscat
- Start date: 3 December 2025
- End date: 8 December 2025

The 2025 World Sailing Inclusion Championships is an international sailing competition for sailors with disabilities. It is the first edition of the World Sailing Inclusion Championships and is taking place at the Mussanah Sailing School in Muscat, Oman.

== Equipment ==
Class	Competition	Entries
RS Venture Connect	Para Inclusive Two Person Keelboat 2025	30
Hansa 303	Inclusive One Person Championship 2025	34
ILCA 6	Intellectual Impairment Championships 2025	5
FarEast 28R	Visually Impaired World Championship 2025	7

== Medal table ==
Rank	Nation	Gold	Silver	Bronze	Total
1	Great Britain (GBR)	3	0	1	4
2	Poland (POL)	1	0	0	1
3	Spain (ESP)	0	2	0	2
4	Portugal (POR)	0	1	0	1
4	United Arab Emirates (UAE)	0	1	0	1
6	Greece (GRE)	0	0	1	1
6	Hong Kong (HKG)	0	0	1	1
6	Japan (JPN)	0	0	1	1
Totals (8 entries)		4	4	4	12

== Results ==
Event	Gold	Silver	Bronze
Intellectual Impairment Championships 2025; ILCA 6	United Kingdom; Murray MacDonald	United Arab Emirates; Marwan Suloom	Hong Kong; Tsz Hin Cheung
Para Inclusive Two Person Keelboat 2025; RS Venture Connect	Poland; Piotr Cichocki; Olga Gornas-Grudzien	Spain; Pau Toni Homar; Ramon Gutierrez	Greece; Vasilis Christoforou; Thodoris Alexas
Inclusive One Person Championship 2025; Hansa 303	United Kingdom; Rory McKinna	Portugal; João Pinto	Japan; Takumi Niwa
Visually Impaired World Championship 2025; FarEast 28R	United Kingdom; Lucy Hodges; Liam Cattermole; Jamie Tylecote; Steve Tylecote	Spain; Daniel Anglada Pich; Monica Azon Canalda; Jordi Sánchez Pérez; Carmen Lopez Garcia	United Kingdom; Karl Haines; Martin Phillips; Gary Butler; Colin Midgley
