= ILCA European Championships =

The ILCA European Championships, until 2020 the Laser European Championships, are annual European Championship sailing regattas in the Laser and Laser Radial classes organised by the EurILCA.

== Editions ==
Year	City	Country	Dates	Host club	Events	Athl.	Nat.	Ref.
1974	Malmö	Sweden			1			
1975	Domaso	Italy			1			
1976	Torquay	United Kingdom			1			
1977	Enkhuizen	Netherlands			1			
1978	Krk	Yugoslavia			1			
1979	Bangor	United Kingdom			1			
1980	Lemvig	Denmark			2			
1981	Carnac	France			2			
1982	Glyfada	Greece			2			
1983	Mandal	Norway			2			
1984	Medemblik	Netherlands			2			
1985	Cascais	Portugal			2			
1986	Morges	Switzerland			2			
1987	Lido di Classe	Italy			2			
1988	Ostend	Belgium			2			
1989	Falmouth	United Kingdom			2			
1990	Lorient	France	10–21 July		3			
1991	El Masnou (Laser)	Spain			1			
1991	Workum (Laser Radial)	Netherlands			2			
1992	Mariestad	Sweden			3			
1993	Cagliari	Italy	24–31 July		3			
1994	Hayling Island	United Kingdom	11–16 July		3			
1995	Istanbul	Turkey	21–26 July		3			
1996	Quiberon	France	2–8 June		3			
1997	Cascais	Portugal	10–16 August		1			
1998	Breitenbrunn	Austria	28 August – 5 September		1			
1999	Helsinki	Finland	23–31 July		1			
2000	Warnemünde	Germany	9–17 June		1			
2001	Puck	Poland			1			
2002	Vallensbæk (Laser)	Denmark	12–20 July		1			
2002	Breitenbrunn (Laser Radial)	Austria	28–31 August		2			
2003	Split (Laser)	Croatia	25 July – 2 August		1			
2003	Lake Garda (Laser Radial)	Italy			2			
2004	Warnemünde (Laser)	Germany	16–24 July		1			
2004	Bangor (Laser Radial)	United Kingdom	23–31 July		1			
2005	Cartagena (Laser)	Spain	4–12 August		1			
2005	Split (Laser Radial)	Croatia	5–12 August		2			
2006	Riccione (Laser Radial)	Italy	9–16 June		1			
2006	Gdynia (Laser)	Poland	5–12 July		1			
2007	Hyères (Laser)	France			1			
2007	Scheveningen (Laser Radial)	Netherlands	27 July – 3 August		1			
2008	Nieuwpoort	Belgium	12–19 July		3			
2009	Landskrona (Laser)	Sweden	1–8 August		1			
2009	Charlottenlund (Laser Radial)	Denmark	9–16 July		2			
2010	Tallinn	Estonia	4–11 June		2			
2011	Helsinki	Finland	1–8 July		2			
2012	Hourtin	France	30 June – 7 July		3			
2013	Dún Laoghaire	Ireland	30 August – 6 September		3			
2014	Split	Croatia	7–14 June		3			
2015	Aarhus	Denmark	17–24 July		3			
2016	Las Palmas	Spain	26 February – 4 March		3			
2017	Barcelona	Spain	1–8 October		3			
2018	La Rochelle	France	5–12 May		3			
2019	Porto	Portugal	20–25 May		3			
2020	Gdańsk	Poland	8–13 October		3			
2021	Varna	Bulgaria	2–9 October	SK Cherno More Briz Varna	3			
2022	Hyères	France	14–21 November	COYCH	3			
2023	Andora	Italy	10–17 March	Circolo Nautico Andora	3	369		
2025	Marstrand	Sweden	11–16 August	GKSS	3			
2026	Kaštela	Croatia	17–22 May	JK Marina Kaštela	3			

== Medalists ==
=== Men's ILCA 6 ===
Year	Gold	Silver	Bronze	Ref.
2016 Las Palmas	Marcin Rudawski (POL)	Ismael Iess (ESP)	Jonasz Stelmaszyk (POL)	
2017 Barcelona	Marcin Rudawski (POL)	Marcelo Cairo (ESP)	Dimitri Papadimitriou (GRE)	
2018 La Rochelle	Nik Pletikos (SLO)	Federico Tocchi (ITA)	Aleksander Arian (POL)	
2019 Porto	Aleksander Arian (POL)	Marcin Rudawski (POL)	Ben Elvin (GBR)	
2020 Gdańsk	Paul Hameeteman (NED)	Filip Ciszkiewicz (POL)	Oskar Madonich (UKR)	
2021 Varna	Stipe Gašpić (CRO)	Oskar Madonich (UKR)	Umut Eyriparmak (TUR)	
2022 Hyères	Rocco Wright (IRL)	Georgios Yiasemides (CYP)	Kacper Stanisławski (POL)	
2023 Andora	Athanasios Kyfidis (GRE)	Mattia Cesana (ITA)	Rocco Wright (IRL)	
2025 Marstrand	Josip Tafra (CRO)	Jiří Tomeš (CZE)	Lovre Bakotić (CRO)	
2026 Kaštela	Claudio Crocco (ITA)	Lorenzo Ghirotti (ITA)	Giovanni Bedoni (ITA)	

=== Women's ILCA 6 ===
Year	Gold	Silver	Bronze	Ref.
2016 Las Palmas	Marit Bouwmeester (NED)	Josefin Olsson (SWE)	Tuula Tenkanen (FIN)	
2017 Barcelona	Marit Bouwmeester (NED)	Anne-Marie Rindom (DEN)	Vasileia Karachaliou (GRE)	
2018 La Rochelle	Marit Bouwmeester (NED)	Maxime Jonker (NED)	Emma Plasschaert (BEL)	
2019 Porto	Anne-Marie Rindom (DEN)	Marit Bouwmeester (NED)	Emma Plasschaert (BEL)	
2020 Gdańsk	Marit Bouwmeester (NED)	Anne-Marie Rindom (DEN)	Agata Barwińska (POL)	
2021 Varna	Agata Barwińska (POL)	Maxime Jonker (NED)	Vasileia Karachaliou (GRE)	
2022 Hyères	Agata Barwińska (POL)	Maud Jayet (SUI)	Marit Bouwmeester (NED)	
2023 Andora	Marit Bouwmeester (NED)	Vasileia Karachaliou (POR)	Mária Érdi (HUN)	
2025 Marstrand	Anna Munch (DEN)	Agata Barwińska (POL)	Emma Plasschaert (BEL)	
2026 Kaštela	Mária Érdi (HUN)	Matilda Nicholls (GBR)	Emma Plasschaert (BEL)	

=== ILCA 7 ===
Year	Gold	Silver	Bronze	Ref.
2016 Las Palmas	Jesper Stålheim (SWE)	Kristian Ruth (NOR)	Giovanni Coccoluto (ITA)	
2017 Barcelona	Nick Thompson (GBR)	Francesco Marrai (ITA)	Pavlos Kontides (CYP)	
2018 La Rochelle	Pavlos Kontides (CYP)	Philipp Buhl (GER)	Michael Beckett (GBR)	
2019 Porto	Lorenzo Chiavarini (GBR)	Nick Thompson (GBR)	Philipp Buhl (GER)	
2020 Gdańsk	Elliot Hanson (GBR)	Michael Beckett (GBR)	Lorenzo Chiavarini (GBR)	
2021 Varna	Michael Beckett (GBR)	Filip Jurišić (CRO)	Jonatán Vadnai (HUN)	
2022 Hyères	Pavlos Kontides (CYP)	Michael Beckett (GBR)	Kaarle Tapper (FIN)	
2023 Andora	Tonči Stipanović (CRO)	Filip Jurišić (CRO)	Pavlos Kontides (CYP)	
2025 Marstrand	Michael Beckett (GBR)	Duko Bos (NED)	Finley Dickinson (GBR)	
2026 Kaštela	Pavlos Kontides (CYP)	Philipp Buhl (GER)	Filip Jurišić (CRO)	
