= 2024 Trofeo Princesa Sofía =

International sailing regatta

Trofeo Princesa Sofía
- First held: 1968
- Organiser: Royal Spanish Sailing Federation
- Classes: 470 (mixed), 49er, 49erFX, Formula Kite, ILCA 7, ILCA 6, iQFoil, Nacra 17
- Start: 29 March 2024
- Finish: 6 April 2024
- Venue: Mallorca
- Website: trofeoprincesasofia.org/en/default/races/race

The 2024 Trofeo Princesa Sofía was the 53rd edition of the Trofeo Princesa Sofía, an international sailing regatta for the 10 Olympic sailing events, that took place from 29 March to 6 April 2024 in a variety of clubs around Mallorca, Spain, namely Club Marítimo San Antonio de la Playa, Club Nàutic S'Arenal, and Playa de Palma. It was part of World Sailing's World Cup series.

Strong winds led to only the Formula Kite events, ILCA 6, ILCA 7 and the 470 being able to sail on the first day.

Ruggero Tita and Caterina Banti of Italy in Nacra 17 and Michael Beckett of Great Britain in ILCA 7 secured their wins on the penultimate day of the regatta. Camille Lecointre and Jérémie Mion of France took home the mixed 470 event. In the ILCA 6 event, Norwegian Mina Mobekk won ahead of teammate Maya Gysler.

== Competition format ==
=== Events and equipment ===
| Event | Equipment |
|---|---|
| Men's dinghy | ILCA 7 |
| Men's skiff | 49er |
| Men's windsurfer | IQFoil |
| Men's kiteboard | Formula Kite |
| Women's dinghy | ILCA 6 |
| Women's skiff | 49erFX |
| Women's kiteboarding | Formula Kite |
| Women's windsurfer | IQFoil |
| Mixed dinghy | 470 |
| Mixed multihull | NACRA 17 |

== Summary ==
=== Medal table ===
| Rank | Nation | Gold | Silver | Bronze | Total |
|---|---|---|---|---|---|
| 1 | Italy (ITA) | 2 | 2 | 0 | 4 |
| 2 | Norway (NOR) | 1 | 2 | 0 | 3 |
| 3 | France (FRA) | 1 | 1 | 3 | 5 |
| 4 | Australia (AUS) | 1 | 1 | 0 | 2 |
| 4 | Spain (ESP) | 1 | 1 | 0 | 2 |
| 6 | Great Britain (GBR) | 1 | 0 | 2 | 3 |
| 7 | Poland (POL) | 1 | 0 | 1 | 2 |
| 8 | Hungary (HUN) | 1 | 0 | 0 | 1 |
| 8 | Singapore (SGP) | 1 | 0 | 0 | 1 |
| 10 | Germany (GER) | 0 | 1 | 2 | 3 |
| 11 | United States (USA) | 0 | 1 | 0 | 1 |
| 11 | Uruguay (URU) | 0 | 1 | 0 | 1 |
| 13 | Cyprus (CYP) | 0 | 0 | 1 | 1 |
| 13 | Japan (JPN) | 0 | 0 | 1 | 1 |
| Totals (14 entries) | | 10 | 10 | 10 | 30 |

=== Event medalists ===
==== Men's events ====
| Event | First | Second | Third |
|---|---|---|---|
| iQfoil | Paweł Tarnowski; Poland | Nicolas Goyard; France | Yun Poulquen; France |
| Formula Kite | Max Maeder; Singapore | Riccardo Pianosi; Italy | Denis Taradin; Cyprus |
| ILCA 7 | Michael Beckett; Great Britain | Philipp Buhl; Germany | Jean-Baptiste Bernaz; France |
| 49er | Diego Botín; Florián Trittel; Spain | Hernán Umpierre; Fernando Diz; Uruguay | Łukasz Przybytek; Jacek Piasecki; Poland |

==== Women's events ====
| Event | First | Second | Third |
|---|---|---|---|
| iQfoil | Mina Mobekk; Norway | Maya Gysler; Norway | Lola Sorin; France |
| Formula Kite | Breiana Whitehead; Australia | Daniela Moroz; United States | Leonie Meyer; Germany |
| ILCA 6 | Mária Érdi; Hungary | Zoe Thomson; Australia | Matilda Nicholls; Great Britain |
| 49er FX | Jana Germani; Giorgia Bertuzzi; Italy | Helene Næss; Marie Rønningen; Norway | Misaki Tanaka; Sera Nagamatsu; Japan |

==== Mixed events ====
| Event | First | Second | Third |
|---|---|---|---|
| 470 | Camille Lecointre; Jérémie Mion; France | Jordi Xammar; Nora Brugman; Spain | Malte Winkel; Anastasiya Winkel; Germany |
| Nacra 17 | Ruggero Tita; Caterina Banti; Italy | Gianluigi Ugolini; Maria Giubilei; Italy | John Gimson; Anna Burnet; Great Britain |
