= 2015 ISAF Youth Sailing World Championships – Boy's 420 =

Boy's 420 at the 2015 ISAF Youth Sailing World Championships
- Venue: Langkawi, Malaysia
- Dates: 27 December 2015 - 3 January 2016
- Competitors: 66 from 33 nations

Medalists
gold medal	Will Louge; Bram Brackman	United States
silver medal	Leonardo Lombardi; Rodrigo Luz	Brazil
bronze medal	Douglas Elmes; Colin O'Sullivan	Ireland

The boy's 420 competition at the 2015 ISAF Youth Sailing World Championships took place between December 27 2015 and January 3 2016. 66 sailors from 33 nations were due to compete. Will Louge and Bram Brackman of the USA won the event.

== Results ==
Rank	Helm	Crew	Country	R1	R2	R3	R4	R5	R6	R7	R8	R9	Total	Nett
1	Will Louge	Bram Brackman	United States	2	2	2	3	6	2	4	1	(16)	38	22
2	Leonardo Lombardi	Rodrigo Luz	Brazil	9	5	4	8	1	1	(11)	6	3	48	37
3	Douglas Elmes	Colin O'Sullivan	Ireland	3	(13)	1	10	5	5	7	4	11	59	46
4	Alec Brodie	Xavier Winston Smith	Australia	1	1	6	9	2	6	14	(34 DSQ)	9	82	48
5	Felipe Martinez Autin Diniz	Ivan Aranguren	Argentina	4	(20)	13	5	9	3	3	11	1	69	49
6	Jia Yi Loh	Matthew Lau	Singapore	5	3	12	6	11	11	2	(20)	2	72	52
7	Paul Feldhusen	Leon Geopfert	Germany	10	10	(17)	15	8	9	9	2	5	85	68
8	Mikhail Ushkov	Timofey Zubkov	Russia	(26)	7	3	12	7	7	8	5	19	94	68
9	Edoardo Ferraro	Francesco Orlando	Italy	7	4	11	(34 OCS)	16	12	1	9	10	104	70
10	Andres Alvares	Pablo Garcia Portela	Spain	6	8	7	7	22	(34 OCS)	16	3	8	111	77
11	Kotaro Matsuo	Takumi Miura	Japan	8	9	16	11	3	8	19	7	(20)	101	81
12	Jakob Eklund	Anton Eklund	Finland	16	17	15	1	(34 OCS)	13	5	10	14	125	91
13	Jinhwan Jung	Ji Hun Park	South Korea	14	15	19	(34 OCS)	4	10	18	8	4	126	92
14	Jonathan Weston	Taylor Balogh	New Zealand	18	19	5	2	18	(20)	10	16	13	121	101
15	Patrick Wilson	Arie Moffat	Canada	13	6	9	17	15	16	13	24	(28)	141	113
16	Max Clapp	Ross Banham	United Kingdom	23	(26)	10	22	19	4	6	14	24	148	122
17	Francisco Maia	Rui Oliveira	Portugal	25	11	(28)	4	14	18	25	21	7	153	125
18	Nicholas Rolaz	Philippe Pittet	Switzerland	19	14	(29)	16	13	19	12	15	25	162	133
19	Muhammad Uzair Amin Mohd Yusof	Naquib Eiman	Malaysia	(30)	21	22	20	10	14	15	26	6	164	134
20	Grzegorz Olko	Ignacy Jaszczuk	Poland	(34 BFD)	16	20	21	12	15	22	23	17	180	146
21	Nikolaus Kampelmuhler	David Lucan	Austria	22	12	8	25	21	(34 DNF)	26	28	12	188	154
22	Ka Chun Siu	Wilson Yun	Hong Kong	28	18	18	13	24	(29)	20	19	15	184	155
23	Lovre Marfat	Karlo Vrsaljko	Croatia	15	28	14	18	17	25	(29)	17	21	184	155
24	Tomas Ugarte	Alejandro Natho	Chile	20	24	21	19	20	17	(28)	18	27	194	166
25	Haris Papazoglou	Rafael Theocharous	Cyprus	11	23	25	28	27	21	24	(34 OCS)	23	216	182
26	Nopporn Booncherd	Kitipoom Kumjorn	Thailand	31	31	26	14	23	(34 DNF)	17	25	22	223	189
27	Nicholas Radovitzky	Martin Radovitzky	Uruguay	24	22	23	26	25	23	(34 DSQ)	29	18	224	190
28	Edgar Villapana	Ameil Agustin	Philippines	29	27	(31)	24	29	24	21	13	26	224	193
29	Haluk Calin	Alp Gucer	Turkey	12	(34 RET)	24	34 OCS	34 OCS	26	27	12	29	232	198
30	Chi-Chian Wu	Chih-Yuan Chu	Chinese Taipei	17	29	27	27	(30)	28	23	22	30	233	203
31	Nicolas Faraday	Wade Ashton	South Africa	21	25	30	23	26	22	30	(31)	31	239	208
32	Gabriel Toribo	Hugo Sebsastian Miranda	Mexico	27	30	(34 DNF)	34 DNS	28	27	31	27	33	271	237
33	Roger Crowter	Tomas Amaral	Macau	(34 DNS)	34 DNF	34 DNF	29	34 DNF	34 DNF	32	30	32	293	259
