= Topper World Championships =

Dinghy sailing Worlds

The Topper World Championship is an annual international sailing regatta of Topper (dinghy), organized by the host club on behalf of the International Topper Class Association and recognized by World Sailing, the sports IOC recognized governing body.

== Events ==
Ed.			Hosts			Fleet	Sailor					Ref.
No	Day/Month	Year	Host club	City	Country	Fleet	No.			Nat.	Cont.	Ref.
1		1992		Dümmer See	Germany	5.3m²						
2	25-29 July	1994	Helensburgh Sailing Club	Helensburgh	United Kingdom	5.3m²	155			15	2+	
3		1996		Dubai	United Arab Emirates	5.3m²						
4		1998		Carnac	France	5.3m²						
5	19-24 Aug	2000	Cushendall Sailing Club	Cushendall	United Kingdom	5.3m²						
6	22 - 27	2002	Zeilvereniging Workum	Workum	Netherlands	5.3m²	132	95	37	5+	2+	
7		2004	Yacht Club de Carnac	Carnac	France	5.3m²	253	174	79	6+	3+	
8		2006	Fraglia Vela Malcesine	Malcesine	Italy	5.3m²						
9	26-31 Aug	2007	Fraglia Vela Malcesine	Malcesine, Lake Garda	Italy	5.3m²	173	117	56	4	1	
10	19-25 Jul	2008	Tralee Bay Sailing Club	Fenit, Co. Kerry	Ireland	5.3m²	176	113	63	3+	1+	
11		2009	Segelclub Ebensee	Ebensee	Austria	5.3m²	94	62	32	6	2	
12	22-27 Aug	2010	Fraglia Vela Malcesine	Lake Garda	Italy	5.3m²	124	82	42	6	2	
13		2011	Irish National Yacht Club	Dun Laoghaire	Ireland	5.3m²	175			3	2	
14		2012	Zeilvereniging Workum	Workum	Netherlands	5.3m²	140	91	49	4	1	
14		2012	Zeilvereniging Workum	Workum	Netherlands	4.2m²	14	10	4	1	1	
15		2013	Cercle Nautique de Loctudy	Loctudy	France	5.3m²	103	61	41	6	3	
15		2013	Cercle Nautique de Loctudy	Loctudy	France	4.2m²	15					
16		2014	Pwllheli Sailing Club	Pwllheli	United Kingdom	5.3m²	134	90	44	7	3	
16		2014	Pwllheli Sailing Club	Pwllheli	United Kingdom	4.2m²	16	11	5	3	2	
15	19-24 Jul	2015	Fraglia Vela Riva	Lake Garda	Italy	5.3m²	126	71	55	6	3	
15	19-24 Jul	2015	Fraglia Vela Riva	Lake Garda	Italy	4.2m²	30	16	14	4	2	
16	23-28 Jul	2016	Ballyholme Yacht Club	Ballyholme N. Ireland	United Kingdom	5.3m²	161	95	66	10	4	
16	23-28 Jul	2016	Ballyholme Yacht Club	Ballyholme N. Ireland	United Kingdom	4.2m²	36	21	15	5	2	
17	22-28 Jul	2017	Cercle Nautique de Loctudy	Loctudy	France	5.3m²	156	93	63	6	3	
17	22-28 Jul	2017	Cercle Nautique de Loctudy	Loctudy	France	4.2m²	55			5	2	
18	14-21 Aug	2018	Longcheer Yacht Club	Shenzhen, China	China	5.3m²	222	146	76	20	5	
18	14-21 Aug	2018	Longcheer Yacht Club	Shenzhen, China	China	4.2m²	45	29	16	9	2	
19	22-26 Jul	2019		Medemblik	Netherlands	5.3m²	162			9	4	
19	22-26 Jul	2019		Medemblik	Netherlands	4.2m²	47			8	3	
N/A		2020		Lake Garda	Italy	Cancelled due to COVID						
N/A		2021	Royal Cork Yacht Club	Crosshaven	Ireland	Cancelled due to COVID						
20		2022	Fraglia Vela Riva	Riva del Garda	Italy	5.3m²	144	87	57	5	2	
20		2022	Fraglia Vela Riva	Riva del Garda	Italy	4.2m²	26	16	10	3	1	
21	22-28 Jul	2023	Royal Cork Yacht Club	Crosshaven	Ireland	5.3m²	196	100	96	9	4	
21	22-28 Jul	2023	Royal Cork Yacht Club	Crosshaven	Ireland	4.2m²	60	38	22	7	2	
22	20-26 Jul	2024	Federacíon de Vela Murcia	Los Alcázares, Mar Menor, Murcia	Spain	5.3m²	138	87	51	8	4	
22	20-26 Jul	2024	Federacíon de Vela Murcia	Los Alcázares, Mar Menor, Murcia	Spain	4.2m²	39	25	14	5	2	
23	19-25 Jul	2025	Royal Yacht Club Hollandia, Regatta Centre	Medemblik	Netherlands	5.3m²	131			7	4	
23	19-25 Jul	2025	Royal Yacht Club Hollandia, Regatta Centre	Medemblik	Netherlands	4.2m²	43			3	2	
19	25-31 Jul	2026	Société des Régates de Saint Pierre	Quiberon, Morbihan, Brittany	France	5.3m²	134	90	44	10	3	
19	25-31 Jul	2026	Société des Régates de Saint Pierre	Quiberon, Morbihan, Brittany	France	4.2m²	42	26	16	4	3	

== Medalists ==
Location	Rig / Boats	Gold	Silver	Bronze	1st Female	Ref.
1992	5.3m²	Tim Willis (GBR)	Stephen Cleland (GBR)	Mikael Norberg (SWE)		
1994	5.3m²	Gordon Miller (GBR)	Austin Bailey (GBR)	Graham Priestley (GBR)	30th / Judith Tolman	
1996	5.3m²	Neil Marston (GBR)	Renee Smith (AUS)	Cameron Miller (UAE)		
1998	5.3m²	Robert Carver (UAE)	Tim Hulse (GBR)	James Grant (GBR)		
2000	5.3m²	Mark Heather (GBR)	Richard Peacock (GBR)	Andy Brooks (GBR)		
2002	5.3m²	Campbell Davidsion (GBR)	Chris Catt (GBR)	Steven Jackson (GBR)	10th / Harriette Trumble (GBR)	
2004	5.3m²	Eifon Mon (GBR)	Craig Paul (GBR)	Thomas Dawbar (GBR)	11th / Melissa Addy (GBR)	
2006	5.3m²	Andrew Brown (GBR)	Bleddyn Mon (GBR)	Michael Wood (GBR)		
2007	5.3m²	Michael Wood (GBR)	Andrew Brown (GBR)	Freddie Connor (GBR)	14th / Lynn Billowes (GBR)	
2008	5.3m²	Elliot Hanson (GBR)	Richard Cumpsty (GBR)	Jonathan Hewat (GBR)	17th / Felicity Foulds (GBR)	
2009	5.3m² / 94	Andrew Bridgman (GBR)	Finn Lynch (IRL)	Felicity Foulds (GBR)	3rd / Felicity Foulds (GBR)	
2010	5.3m² / 124	Michele Benamati (ITA)	Giovanni Benamati (ITA)	Edward Jones (GBR)		
2011	5.3m² / 175	Matt Venables (GBR)	Robbie Robinson (GBR)	Patrick Crosbie (IRL)	5th / Laura Gilmore (GBR)	
2012	5.3m² / 140	Giles Kuzyk (GBR)	Edward Higson (GBR)	Felix Crowther (GBR)	8th / Ellie Cumpsty (GBR)	
2013	5.3m² / 103	Liam Glynn (IRL)	Thomas Wallwork (GBR)	Georgie McKenzie (GBR)	4th / Georgie McKenzie (GBR)	
2013	4.2m² / 15	Hamish Beaumont (GBR)	Victoria Cowan (GBR)	George Graham (GBR)	2nd / Victoria Cowan (GBR)	
2014	5.3m² / 134	Calum Rosie (GBR)	Adam D'Arcy (IRL)	Tom Walker (GBR)	4th / Bella Fellows (GBR)	
2014	4.2m² / 16	Daniel Thompson (GBR)	Jenna McCarlie (IRL)	Rachael McCluskey (GBR)	2nd / Jenna McCarlie (IRL)	
2015	5.3m² / 126	Vittorio Gallinaro (ITA)	Patrick Zeni (ITA)	Niamh Harper (GBR)	3rd / Niamh Harper (GBR)	
2015	4.2m² / 30	Francesca Ramazotti (ITA)	Brando Mattivi (ITA)	Gregorio Moreschi (ITA)	1st / Francesca Ramazotti (ITA)	
2016	5.3m² / 161	Elliott Kuzyk (GBR)	Tim Hartnell (GBR)	Sam Cooper (GBR)	7th / Sophie Crosbie (IRL)	
2016	4.2m² / 36	Max Yuang-Ngam (THA)	Rabbit Su (CHN)	Paton Mervielde (THA)	5th / Catherine Albone (GBR)	
2017	5.3m² / 156	Scott Wilkinson (GBR)	Samuel Cooper (GBR)	Dan McGaughey (IRL)	4th / Milly Jinks (GBR)	
2017	4.2m² / 55	Sean Woodard (GBR)	Xinran Chen (CHN)	Yikang Su (CHN)		
2018	insufficient races to produce a World Champion					
2019	5.3m² / 152	Leo Wilkinson (GBR)	Kate Robertson (GBR)	Yikang Su (CHN)	2nd / Kate Robertson (GBR)	
2019	4.2m² / 47	Yushuo Liao (CHN)	Bjorn Handley (GBR)	Jiahan Chen (CHN)		
2020	Cancelled due to COVID					
2021	Cancelled due to COVID					
2022	5.3m² / 144	Joe Rowe (GBR)	Bobby Driscoll (IRL)	Jake Rawes (GBR)	4th / Lily Browning (GBR)	
2022	4.2m² / 26	Calum Pollard (IRL)	Amelia Smith (GBR)	Ethan Rhodes (GBR)	2nd / Amelia Smith (GBR)	
2023	5.3m² / 196	Alex Jones (GBR)	Ruoque Su (CHN)	Rory Clow (GBR)	4th / Jessica Powell (GBR)	
2023	4.2m² / 60	Rory Whyte (IRL)	Andrew O'Neill (IRL)	Che Liu (CHN)	4th / Xinjie Xia (CHN)	
2024	5.3m² / 196	Che Liu (CHN)	Manuel Barrionuevo (ESP)	Sergio López Palacios (ESP)	9th / Gemma Brady (IRL)	
2024	4.2m² / 39	Hari Clark (GBR)	Sam Mason (GBR)	Tomás A'Coistealbha (IRL)	9th / Wanqi Luo (CHN)	
2025	5.3m² / 131	Sam Mason (GBR)	Charlie Mackenzie (GBR)	Toby Turner (GBR)	13th / Freya Antonelli (GBR)	
2025	4.2m² / 43	Feiran Wan (CHN)	Henry Cruse (GBR)	Reuben Wealthy (GBR)		
2026	5.3m² / 134	Hari Clark (GBR)	Joseph Hulse (GBR)	Leo West-Hurst (IRL)	7th / Amy Whyte (IRL)	
2026	4.2m² / 42	Freddie Smallwood (GBR)	Jake Day (GBR)	Isabelle Simpson (GBR)	3rd / Isabelle Simpson (GBR)	
