= 2013 Men's Laser Radial World Championship =

The 2013 Laser Radial World Championships for Men were held in Dún Laoghaire, Ireland between August 30 and September 6, 2013.

== Results ==
Year	Gold	Silver	Bronze
2013	Tristan Brown (AUS)	Marcin Rudawski (POL)	Finn Lynch (IRL)
