= 2015 ISAF Youth Sailing World Championships – Boy's Laser Radial =

Men's Laser Radial at the 2015 ISAF Youth Sailing World Championships
- Venue: Langkawi, Malaysia
- Dates: 27 December 2015 - 3 January 2016
- Competitors: 68 from 68 nations

Medalists
gold medal	Alistair Young	Australia
silver medal	George Gautrey	New Zealand
bronze medal	Daniel Whiteley	Great Britain

The boy's Laser Radial competition at the 2015 ISAF Youth Sailing World Championships took place between December 27 2015 and January 3 2016. 68 sailors from 68 nations were due to compete. Alistar Young of Australia won the event.

== Results ==
Pos	Helm	Country	R1	R2	R3	R4	R5	R6	R7	R8	R9	Total	Nett
1	Alistair Young	Australia	1.0	4.0	1.0	1.0	5.0	2.0	7.0	11.0	(15.0)	47.0	32.0
2	George Gautrey	New Zealand	7.0	2.0	3.0	(69.0 OCS)	9.0	16.0	1.0	10.0	4.0	121.0	52.0
3	Daniel Whiteley	United Kingdom	10.0	9.0	(15.0)	6.0	11.0	12.0	6.0	3.0	1.0	73.0	58.0
4	Nicholas Baird	United States	3.0	5.0	5.0	3.0	4.0	(23.0)	2.0	19.0	19.0	83.0	60.0
5	Gianmarco Planchestainer	Italy	(20.0)	16.0	12.0	15.0	6.0	8.0	4.0	8.0	2.0	91.0	71.0
6	Francisco Guaragna Rigonat	Argentina	17.0	3.0	24.0	4.0	10.0	4.0	(34.0)	2.0	11.0	109.0	75.0
7	Dominik Perkovic	Croatia	4.0	7.0	9.0	5.0	15.0	21.0	5.0	14.0	(32.0)	112.0	80.0
8	Pedro Luis Fernandez	Puerto Rico	6.0	13.0	4.0	7.0	7.0	1.0	(28.0)	26.0	26.0	118.0	90.0
9	Jakub Rodziewicz	Poland	14.0	(69.0 BFD)	10.0	14.0	3.0	15.0	20.0	16.0	12.0	173.0	104.0
10	Oskari Muhonen	Finland	9.0	1.0	2.0	13.0	1.0	5.0	12.0	(69.0 RET)	69.0 DNE	181.0	112.0
11	Matías Dyck	Ecuador	2.0	(69.0 BFD)	6.0	11.0	12.0	11.0	14.0	38.0	18.0	181.0	112.0
12	Kirill Evfimyevskiy	Russia	5.0	6.0	8.0	2.0	2.0	(69.0 DNF)	65.6 DPI	6.0	21.0	184.6	115.6
13	Ramiro Foguet Rojas	Spain	30.0	17.0	21.0	10.0	14.0	6.0	3.0	22.0	(41.0)	164.0	123.0
14	Markus Piron Kirketerp	Denmark	18.0	18.0	14.0	19.0	13.0	14.0	17.0	(36.0)	13.0	162.0	126.0
15	Liam Glynn	Ireland	11.0	8.0	28.0	12.0	26.0	3.0	(41.0)	32.0	8.0	169.0	128.0
16	Aari Azman	Malaysia	12.0	11.0	23.0	(38.0)	28.0	36.0	9.0	1.0	10.0	168.0	130.0
17	Benjamin Wempe	Netherlands	16.0	10.0	7.0	23.0	19.0	37.0	10.0	17.0	(40.0)	179.0	139.0
18	Clemente Seguel	Chile	8.0	(69.0 BFD)	11.0	8.0	16.0	10.0	19.0	30.0	38.0	209.0	140.0
19	Wilhelm Kark	Sweden	13.0	27.0	(40.0)	18.0	21.0	19.0	18.0	12.0	16.0	184.0	144.0
20	Jakub Halouzka	Czech Republic	23.0	23.0	31.0	25.0	(32.0)	18.0	8.0	15.0	6.0	181.0	149.0
21	Matti Muru	Canada	27.0	31.0	30.0	22.0	(44.0)	22.0	13.0	5.0	7.0	201.0	157.0
22	Ignacio Rordiguez	Uruguay	(40.0)	19.0	17.0	16.0	33.0	13.0	22.0	25.0	17.0	202.0	162.0
23	Yuki Nishio	Japan	21.0	26.0	20.0	26.0	27.0	29.0	(38.0)	7.0	14.0	208.0	170.0
24	Alexandre Boite	France	26.0	30.0	13.0	(32.0)	29.0	27.0	23.0	4.0	23.0	207.0	175.0
25	Pablo Bertran	Cayman Islands	24.0	28.0	22.0	20.0	(41.0)	25.0	25.0	13.0	25.0	223.0	182.0
26	Renzo Sanguineti	Peru	38.0	21.0	26.0	9.0	(46.0)	7.0	36.0	28.0	20.0	231.0	185.0
27	Ricardo Luz Bittencourt	Brazil	22.0	(69.0 BFD)	34.0	17.0	25.0	50.0	15.0	21.0	5.0	258.0	189.0
28	Jacob Flachberger	Austria	19.0	12.0	16.0	36.0	34.0	17.0	42.0	(51.0)	24.0	251.0	200.0
29	Bernie Chin	Singapore	33.0	22.0	27.0	24.0	22.0	20.0	21.0	(48.0)	31.0	248.0	200.0
30	Min Gyu Jeong	South Korea	25.0	37.0	(38.0)	34.0	24.0	32.0	11.0	24.0	30.0	255.0	217.0
31	Nicholas Bezi	Hong Kong	36.0	20.0	18.0	27.0	18.0	45.0	(69.0 OCS)	20.0	43.0	296.0	227.0
32	Mehmet Duran Dinc	Turkey	28.0	(69.0 BFD)	39.0	52.0	8.0	9.0	37.0	23.0	36.0	301.0	232.0
33	Marcello Marcia	South Africa	34.0	(69.0 BFD)	19.0	21.0	40.0	31.0	33.0	18.0	39.0	304.0	235.0
34	Seifeddine Dhaouadi	Tunisia	15.0	15.0	37.0	29.0	30.0	33.0	45.0	39.0	(50.0)	293.0	243.0
35	Daniel Petrovic	British Virgin Islands	44.0	29.0	35.0	45.0	31.0	30.0	(49.0)	9.0	27.0	299.0	250.0
36	Chusitt Punjamala	Thailand	35.0	24.0	29.0	31.0	36.0	34.0	16.0	45.0	(56.0)	306.0	250.0
37	Jules Mitchel	Netherlands Antilles	29.0	34.0	33.0	30.0	(37.0)	26.0	31.0	33.0	34.0	287.0	250.0
38	Mads Severin Hassum-Olsen	Norway	39.0	25.0	47.0	39.0	47.0	38.0	26.0	(49.0)	3.0	313.0	264.0
39	Micheal Wollmann	Bermuda	42.0	35.0	25.0	35.0	23.0	42.0	(44.0)	34.0	29.0	309.0	265.0
40	Filipe Andre	Angola	49.0	36.0	43.0	43.0	35.0	24.0	(69.0 OCS)	31.0	9.0	339.0	270.0
41	Ahmad Zainuddin	Indonesia	50.0	32.0	(53.0)	44.0	17.0	35.0	30.0	37.0	37.0	335.0	282.0
42	Orestis Germanos	Cyprus	37.0	33.0	41.0	42.0	38.0	(43.0)	24.0	42.0	28.0	328.0	285.0
43	Paul De Souza	Bahamas	45.0	38.0	(50.0)	33.0	39.0	28.0	27.0	40.0	45.0	345.0	295.0
44	Tarkan Bolat	Romania	46.0	(69.0 BFD)	42.0	28.0	49.0	39.0	29.0	41.0	22.0	365.0	296.0
45	Jasper Paulsen	Germany	32.0	(69.0 BFD)	32.0	49.0	42.0	47.0	32.0	35.0	33.0	371.0	302.0
46	Lourenco Mateus	Portugal	31.0	14.0	44.0	41.0	45.0	49.0	39.0	43.0	(69.0 OCS)	375.0	306.0
47	Tijn Van Der Gulik	Netherlands Antilles	47.0	40.0	36.0	37.0	20.0	41.0	48.0	(53.0)	49.0	371.0	318.0
48	Hsiu-Chuan Chiang	Chinese Taipei	48.0	42.0	49.0	50.0	52.0	(60.0)	40.0	29.0	42.0	412.0	352.0
49	Leopoldo Seifert	Mexico	(69.0 OCS)	45.0	51.0	54.0	53.0	55.0	46.0	27.0	48.0	448.0	379.0
50	Peng Zhu	China	59.0	39.0	46.0	40.0	50.0	56.0	35.0	58.0	(69.0 RET)	452.0	383.0
51	Partik Melis	Slovakia	53.0	(69.0 BFD)	52.0	46.0	43.0	44.0	52.0	50.0	44.0	453.0	384.0
52	Scott Gittens	Barbados	41.0	43.0	48.0	51.0	51.0	48.0	51.0	52.0	(69.0 OCS)	454.0	385.0
53	Joshua Loane	Cook Islands	43.0	41.0	(55.0)	48.0	54.0	46.0	53.0	46.0	55.0	441.0	386.0
54	Norman Jarve	Estonia	52.0	44.0	(56.0)	53.0	55.0	51.0	47.0	44.0	47.0	449.0	393.0
55	Salim Sedoud	Algeria	56.0	(69.0 BFD)	45.0	47.0	48.0	40.0	55.0	55.0	51.0	466.0	397.0
56	Noah Furlonge-Walker	Trinidad and Tobago	51.0	47.0	(62.0)	56.0	57.0	53.0	50.0	47.0	46.0	469.0	407.0
57	Tas Kolman	Slovenia	55.0	46.0	(59.0)	59.0	58.0	57.0	54.0	57.0	35.0	480.0	421.0
58	Antonio Ricardez	Belize	54.0	49.0	58.0	57.0	59.0	52.0	43.0	(61.0)	60.0	493.0	432.0
59	Teariki Numa	Papua New Guinea	62.0	48.0	(63.0)	55.0	56.0	54.0	60.0	56.0	57.0	511.0	448.0
60	Hanlong Bordais	Macau	57.0	50.0	54.0	58.0	(62.0)	58.0	62.0	54.0	59.0	514.0	452.0
61	Ali El Demerdash	Egypt	58.0	51.0	57.0	61.0	60.0	61.0	57.0	59.0	(69.0 RET)	533.0	464.0
62	Berry Manu Lore	Vanuatu	60.0	52.0	61.0	(69.0 DNC)	61.0	59.0	58.0	63.0	58.0	541.0	472.0
63	Imamu Sahala	Tanzania	63.0	53.0	(64.0)	63.0	64.0	62.0	61.0	64.0	53.0	547.0	483.0
64	Martin Servina	Seychelles	61.0	(69.0 BFD)	60.0	60.0	63.0	69.0 DNF	56.0	60.0	54.0	552.0	483.0
65	Artjoms Svecovs	Latvia	(69.0 DNF)	69.0 BFD	65.0	62.0	65.0	63.0	59.0	62.0	52.0	566.0	497.0
66	Dinouk Avishka De A Goonewardena	Sri Lanka	(69.0 DNF)	69.0 DNC	69.0 DNC	69.0 DNC	69.0 DNC	69.0 DNC	69.0 DNC	69.0 DNC	69.0 DNC	621.0	552.0
66	Viliame Ratutu	Fiji	(69.0 DNF)	69.0 DNC	69.0 DNC	69.0 DNC	69.0 DNC	69.0 DNC	69.0 DNC	69.0 DNC	69.0 DNC	621.0	552.0
66	Colin Brego	United States Virgin Islands	(69.0 DNF)	69.0 DNC	69.0 DNC	69.0 DNC	69.0 DNC	69.0 DNC	69.0 DNC	69.0 DNC	69.0 DNC	621.0	552.0
