= Eduardo Couto =

Brazilian sailor (born 1985)

Personal information
- Nationality: Brazil
- Born: 18 March 1985 (age 41) Rio de Janeiro, Brazil
- Height: 1.80 m (5 ft 11 in)
- Weight: 80 kg (176 lb)

Sailing career
- Sport: Sailing
- Club: Iate Clube do Rio de Janeiro
- Class: Dinghy
Medal record
Men's sailing
Representing Brazil
World Championships
Gold medal – first place	2005 Fortaleza	Laser Radial

Eduardo Couto (born 18 March 1985) is a Brazilian former sailor, who specialized in the Laser Radial and Finn classes. He won a gold medal in the Laser Radial boat at the class-associated 2005 Worlds in Fortaleza, before switching to a heavyweight division on his only Olympic trip to Beijing 2008. Couto is a member of the Rio de Janeiro Yacht Club (Portuguese: Iate Clube do Rio de Janeiro).

Couto competed for the Brazilian sailing squad in the Finn class at the 2008 Summer Olympics in Beijing. Nearly six months earlier, he was selected over the teenager Jorge Zarif to lock the country's top Finn berth for the Games, based on his aggregate scores in a lineup of international regattas approved by the Brazilian Sailing Confederation. Couto enjoyed the series comfortably with a blistering runner-up finish and a couple of top ten marks attained in the initial half (first to fifth legs). A false-start penalty in the eighth race and an unforeseen cancellation due to lack of wind, however, faded Couto's chances to enter the final round, landing him to thirteenth overall with 89 net points.
