= John Karageorgis =

Personal information
- Native name: Γιάννης Καραγεωργης; Ιωάννης Καραγεωργης
- Full name: John Karageorgis
- National team: Greece
- Born: 1929 Athens, Greece
- Died: 2002 (74) New York City, United States

Sport
- Sport: Laser Radial

Achievements and titles
- World finals: 1 Third place Laser Radial World Championships, class laser radial (1991)

John Karageorgis (Greek: Γιάννης Καραγεωργης or Ιωάννης Καραγεωργης; February 17, 1929 in Greece – March 20, 2002 in New York City) was greek sailor competitor, regatta sailor and sportsman that had obtained the bronze medal for his country in the 1991 Laser Radial World Championship.

Being an advanced age Regatta competitor, earned the bronze medal in 1991 for his country in the Laser Radial category.

His body was buried in the Saint Michael's Cemetery at East Elmhurst, New York.

== Professional achievements ==
The newly created Laser Radial World Championships, organized by the International Sailing Federation (ISAF), held on January 1, 1991 in its third edition at the Porto Carras Grand Resort, located in the municipality of Sitonia, Macedonia Peninsula, Greece. At that time, it was not yet in the Olympic calendar, so, it was the highest tournament of the specialty.

The date, refers to the third edition of the world championship of the specialty, whose medal was stayed with the Australian Stewart Casey in the first place with gold, in the second place with the silver also the Greek Maria Vlachau and in the third John Karageorgis with the bronze medal.

Until 2019, Karageorgis has been one of the 6 Greek male medalists in the history of the competition. This country occupies the 8th place in the historical medal table of the category, from a total of 20 countries that appear in it.
