= Michael Beckett =

British Olympic sailor

Michael Beckett OLY
Personal information
- Nickname: Micky
- Nationality: British
- Born: 27 March 1995 (age 31) Solva, Pembrokeshire, Wales

Sailing career
- Sport: Sailing
- Club: Solva Sailing Club
- Class: ILCA 7
Medal record
Representing Great Britain
Sailing
Sailing World Championships
Silver medal – second place	2023 The Hague	Men's ILCA 7
ILCA 7 World Championship
Bronze medal – third place	2024 Adelaide	Men's ILCA 7
ILCA European Championships
Gold medal – first place	2021 Varna	Men's ILCA 7
Gold medal – first place	2025 Marstrand	Men's ILCA 7
Silver medal – second place	2018 La Rochelle	Men's ILCA 7
Silver medal – second place	2020 Gdańsk	Men's ILCA 7
Silver medal – second place	2022 Hyères	Men's ILCA 7

Michael Beckett OLY (born 27 March 1995) is a British sailor who won a gold medal at the 2021 ILCA European Championships and silver at the 2023 Sailing World Championships. He represented Great Britain at the 2024 Summer Olympics.

== Career ==
Beckett began competing aged 10 after learning to sail on his father's handmade boat.

He won his first major medal when he claimed silver at the 2018 Laser European Championships in La Rochelle, France.

Beckett was part of a historic one-two-three for Great Britain at the 2020 ILCA European Championships in Gdańsk, Poland, as he took silver with teammates Elliot Hanson and Lorenzo Chiavarini winning gold and bronze respectively. It was the first time that Britain had taken all three podium places at a major Laser class championship.

He finally won continental gold at the 2021 ILCA European Championships in Varna, Bulgaria, taking the title with a race to spare after leading throughout the competition.

Beckett took a third European Championship silver medal at the 2022 championships in Hyères, France.

He won silver at the 2023 Sailing World Championships in The Hague, Netherlands, and in doing so he clinched an ILCA 7 qualification spot for Great Britain at the 2024 Summer Olympics.

In October 2023 Beckett was named among the first 10 members of the British Sailing Team for the Paris Games.

Despite being given a penalty in the qualifying section, Beckett took a bronze medal at the ILCA 7 World Championship in Adelaide, Australia, in January 2024.

He then won the prestigious Trofeo Princesa Sofía regatta in Palma, Mallorca, Spain, for the third successive year at the 53rd edition in April 2024.

Beckett recovered from a difficult opening to his Olympic regatta to move into second place after day three thanks to two fourth place finishes. However, he suffered a disqualification for being over the start line before the gun fired in the first race on day four and, despite an eighth place finish in the next race, dropped back to fourth going into the final day of the opening series. A lack of sufficient wind saw those races cancelled leaving Beckett still in fourth ahead of the medal race. Having looked set to claim a medal only to see the race abandoned due to a shift in wind, Beckett was given three separate penalties when racing restarted and came 10th to end in sixth overall.

== Personal life ==
Beckett has a Ship Science degree from the University of Southampton. He worked as a television producer for the sailing events at the delayed 2020 Summer Olympics in Tokyo, Japan.
