= Keith Wilkins =

British dinghy sailor

Personal information
- Born: c.1945 (age 80–81) United Kingdom
- Partner: Linda
- Children: 3

Sailing career
- Sport: Sailing
- Club: Chelmarsh Sailing Club; Chew Valley Lake Sailing Club (former)
- Classes: Laser (ILCA 7); Laser Radial (ILCA 6)

Achievements and titles
- Regional finals: 1976 European Championships: Laser – Gold
Medal record
European Championship
Gold medal – first place	1976 Torquay	Laser
ILCA Masters World Championships
Gold medal – first place	1991 Porto Carras	Laser (Grand)
Gold medal – first place	1993 Takapuna	Laser (Grand)
Gold medal – first place	1994 Wakayama	Laser (Grand)
Gold medal – first place	1995 Tenerife	Laser (Grand)
Gold medal – first place	1996 Cape Town	Laser (Grand)
Bronze medal – third place	1997 Algarrobo	Laser (Grand)
Gold medal – first place	1999 Melbourne	Laser (Grand)
Gold medal – first place	2000 Cancún	Laser (Grand)
Gold medal – first place	2001 Crosshaven	Laser (Grand)
Gold medal – first place	2002 Hyannis	Laser (Grand)
Gold medal – first place	2010 Hayling Island	Laser Radial (Great Grand)
Gold medal – first place	2011 San Francisco	Laser Radial (Great Grand)
Gold medal – first place	2014 Hyères	Laser Radial (Great Grand)
Bronze medal – third place	2015 Kingston	Laser Radial (Great Grand)
Asia Pacific Laser Championships
Gold medal – first place	2010 Pattaya	Laser (Great Grand)
Bronze medal – third place	2010 Pattaya	Laser Radial
- Updated on 14 September 2025

Keith Wilkins (born c. 1945) is a British sailor and sailing coach, who competed in the Laser class. He won the men's title at the 1976 Laser European Championship in Torquay, England; and has won the ILCA Masters World Championships thirteen times.

== Sailing career ==
Wilkins began sailing aged 29 years and less than two years later won the European championship. He was not coached and taught himself. Wilkins sailed for Chew Valley Lake Sailing Club, in Bristol, which listed him among notable former members of its Laser fleet;, and later raced and coached with Chelmarsh Sailing Club in Shropshire.

After competing is World Championships titles during the 1970s and 1980s, Wilkins turned his attention to the World Masters Championships in 1988 and became one of the most successful competitors in the Laser/ILCA Masters scene. Between 1991 (Note: Masters World Championships were not held in 1992.) and 1996, Wilkins was undefeated as World Masters Champion. He was placed third in the 1997 World Masters held in Algarrobo, Chile. In 1999, Wilkins won the World Masters Championship, held in Melbourne, Australia; repeated in the following year, in Cancún, Mexico; and again in 2002, in Hyannis, where it was reported that he defended his title.

Following his 65th birthday, at the 2010 Laser Masters World Championships held in Hayling Island, Wilkins was required to race in the Laser Radial Great Grand Master fleet. He won the division and was reported as taking his eleventh Laser Masters World Championship title. He won his 12th World Masters Championship in San Francisco, USA, in 2011; and he was described as a 12-time world champion during the 2012 Laser World Masters in Brisbane, Australia. He continued to feature at Masters level, including a podium in the Radial Great Grand Master division at the 2015 Laser Masters Worlds, in Kingston, Canada; and in 2025, he was described as a 13-time world-champion.

Earlier in 2010 he also claimed titles at the Open Asia Pacific Laser Championships, held at the Royal Varuna Yacht Club in Pattaya, winning the Great Grand Master category and placing third in the Radial fleet overall.

During his career, Wilkins has coached British sailors, including Ben Ainslie, and internationally in Canada, China, India, Korea, Pakistan, and the United States.
