= Carl-Ulrik Schierup =

Swedish Professor of Ethnicity

Carl-Ulrik Schierup (born 1948) is a Swedish Professor of Ethnicity at Linköping University.

Schierup was born in Aarhus, Denmark. He concluded his doctoral studies in socioanthropology in 1977 at Aarhus University (nostrified in Sweden in 1983). In 1988 he completed a doctoral degree in sociology at Umeå University, in Sweden. At the South Jutland University Centre, Denmark, and at Umeå University he directed major research programmes on migration and ethnic relations. In 1999 he was appointed professor of labour and ethnic studies at the Swedish National Institute for Working Life (NIWL) and Linköping University. He is director of the Institute for Research on Migration, Ethnicity and Society, REMESO, at Linköping University.

Schierup's research comprises a wide range of subjects relating to international migration and ethnicity, such as ethnic conflict, citizenship and nationalism. His research also deals with economic and social development in the former Yugoslavia, and employment and social exclusion and inclusion in Europe, among others.
