= Daniel Whiteley =

British sailor

Personal information
- Full name: Daniel Whiteley
- Nationality: United Kingdom
- Born: 1997 or 1998 (age 27–28) Bangor, Wales

Sailing career
- Sport: Sailing
- Classes: ILCA 6, ILCA 7

Daniel Whiteley (born 1997 or 1998) is a former British sailor who placed 3rd in the Laser Radial at the 2015 ISAF Youth Sailing World Championships after winning the British Youth Nationals in April that year. He competed at his first ILCA 7 World Championship after joining the British Sailing Team in 2021.
