= Mark Bethwaite =

Australian sailor

Francis Mark Bethwaite AM (born 20 March 1948) is an Australian sailor. He was educated at North Sydney Boys High School He competed for Australia at two Olympic Games, 1972 and 1976, in the Flying Dutchman class.

He is the son of pilot, yachtsman, yacht designer and meteorologist Frank Bethwaite and the brother of fellow dual Olympian Nicky Bethwaite.

A civil engineer, he has served on the boards of many Australian companies.
