= Wolfgang Gerz =

German sailor (1952–2023)

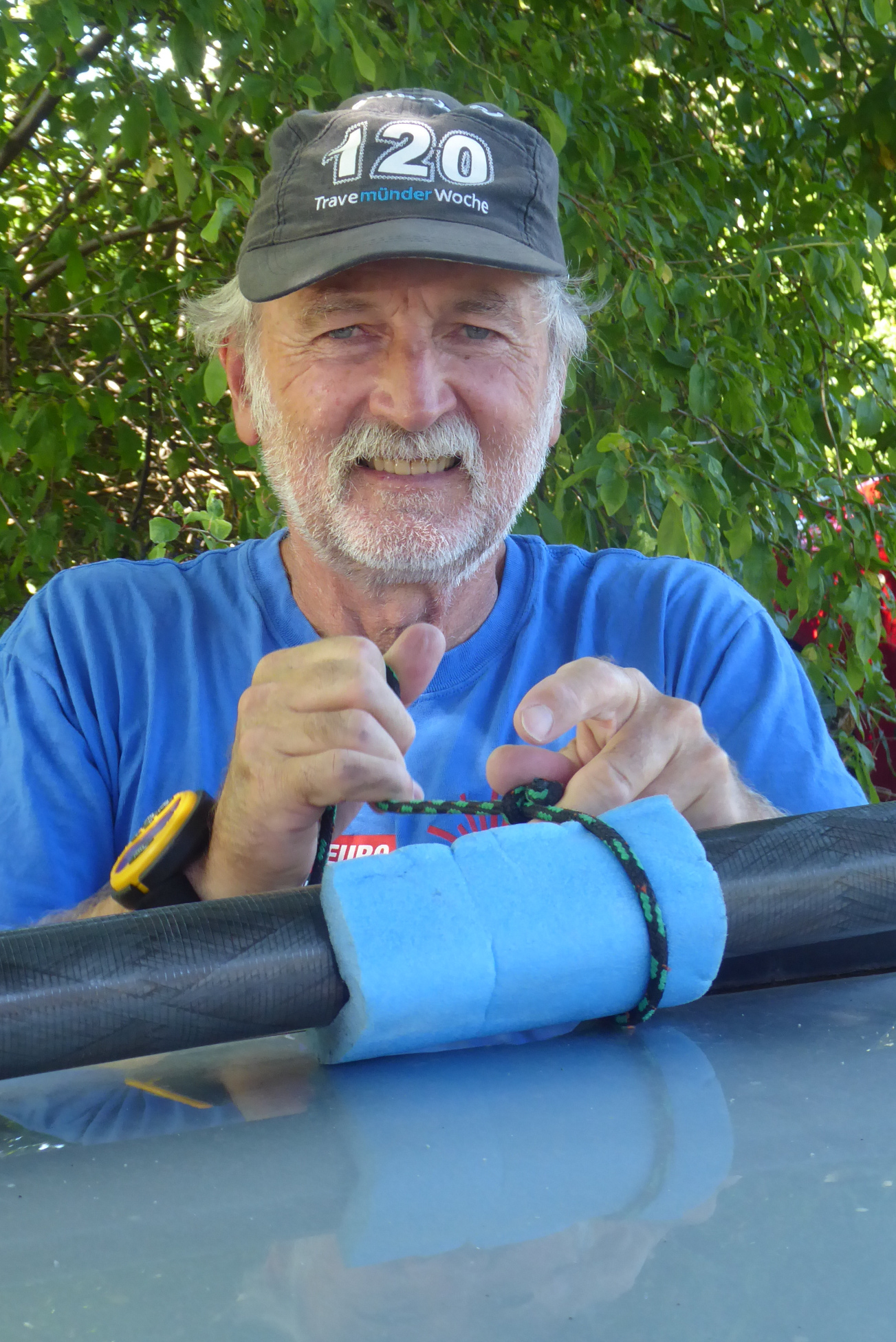

Personal information
- Nationality: German
- Born: 8 October 1952; Munich, Bavaria, West Germany
- Died: 2 April 2023 (aged 70)

Sport
- Sport: Sailing

Wolfgang Gerz (German pronunciation: [ˈvɔlfɡaŋ ˈgɛʁt͡s], 8 October 1952 – 2 April 2023) was a German sailor. He competed in the Finn event at the 1984 Summer Olympics. Gerz died on 2 April 2023, at the age of 70.
