= World Sailing Inclusion Championships =

- First held: 2025
- Organiser: World Sailing
- Classes: Hansa 303, 2.4mR, RS Venture Connect, Challenger, ILCA 6, Hansa Liberty, WingFoil
- Website: https://www.sailing.org/world-sailing-inclusion-championships/

The World Sailing Inclusion Championships are sailing world championships held for disabled athletes. The first edition took place in Oman in 2025.

== Editions ==
Year	City	Country	Dates	Events	Athletes	Nations	Notes
2025	Muscat	Oman	3 – 8 December	4	154	37	
2026	Portimão	Portugal	1 – 11 October	11			

== Events/Equipment ==
Event				Boat	Year	
Type	Crew	Gender	Disability	Boat	2025	2026
Dinghy	One	Open	Intellectual; Impairments	ILCA 6	●	●
Keelboat	One	Open	Para	Hansa 303	●	●
Keelboat	One	Open	Para Technical	2.4mR		●
Keelboat	One	Open	Para with High Support Needs	Hansa Liberty		●
Keelboat	Two	Open	Inclusive	Hansa 303		●
Keelboat	Two	Open	Inclusive	RS Venture Connect	●	●
Keelboat	Varies	Open	Para Vision Impairment	FarEast 28R	●	
Keelboat	Varies	Open	Para Vision Impairment	RS 21		●
WingFoil		Open	Para Seated	WingFoil		●
Multihull		Open	Para Inclusive	Challenger		●
Number of Events					4	9
