= 2015 ISAF Youth Sailing World Championships =

Event title
- Edition: 45th

Event details
- Venue: Langkawi, Malaysia
- Dates: 17 December 2015 - 3 January 2016

The 2015 ISAF Youth Sailing World Championships took place in Langkawi, Malaysia from December 27, 2015, to January 3, 2016. It was the 45th edition of the ISAF Youth Sailing World Championships and the 4th to be held in Asia.

== Competition format ==
=== Events and equipment ===
Event	Equipment
Men's dinghy (single hander)	Laser Radial
Men's dinghy (double hander)	420
Men's skiff	29er
Men's windsurfer	RS:X
Women's dinghy (single hander)	Laser Radial
Women's dinghy (double hander)	420
Women's skiff	29er
Women's windsurfer	RS:X
Open Multihull	SL 16

== Summary ==
=== Medal table ===
* Host nation (Malaysia)

Rank	Nation	Gold	Silver	Bronze	Total
1	France	2	0	0	2
2	Australia	1	2	0	3
3	Poland	1	0	1	2
4	Finland	1	0	0	1
4	Hungary	1	0	0	1
4	Russia	1	0	0	1
4	Slovenia	1	0	0	1
4	United States	1	0	0	1
9	New Zealand	0	2	2	4
10	Brazil	0	1	1	2
10	Great Britain	0	1	1	2
12	Argentina	0	1	0	1
12	Denmark	0	1	0	1
12	Germany	0	1	0	1
15	China	0	0	1	1
15	Ireland	0	0	1	1
15	Norway	0	0	1	1
15	Spain	0	0	1	1
Totals (18 entries)		9	9	9	27

=== Event medalists ===
==== Men's events ====
Event	First	Second	Third
Laser Radial	Alistair Young; Australia	George Gautrey; New Zealand	Daniel Whiteley; Great Britain
420	Will Logue; Bram Brakman; United States	Leonardo Lombardi; Rodrigo Luz; Brazil	Douglas Elmes; Colin O'Sullivan; Ireland
29er	Peter Lin Janezic; Anze Podlogar; Slovenia	Jackson Keon; Nick Egnot Johnson; New Zealand	Tomas Mathisen; Mads Mathisen; Norway
RS:X	Titouan Le Bosq; France	Francisco Saubidet Birkner; Argentina	Brenno Francioli; Brazil

==== Women's events ====
Event	First	Second	Third
Laser Radial	Maria Erdi; Hungary	Hannah Anderssohn; Germany	Megdalena Kwasna; Poland
420	Julia Szmit; Hanna Dzik; Poland	Nia Jerwood; Lisa Smith; Australia	Maria Caba; Carla Diaz; Spain
29er	Sirre Kronlof; Veera Hokka; Finland	Laerke Graversen; Iben Nielsby Christensen; Denmark	Greta Stewart; Kate Stewart; New Zealand
RS:X	Stefania Elfutina; Russia	Emma Wilson; Great Britain	Xian Ting Huang; China

==== Open events ====
Event	First	Second	Third
SL 16	Louis Flament; Charles Dorange; France	Shaun Connor; Sophie Renouf; Australia	Tamryn Lindsay; William McKenzie; New Zealand
