= RS Venture =

Dinghy developed in 2011

Development
- Designer: Phil Morrison
- Year: 2011
- Design: One-Design
- Name: RS Venture

Boat
- Crew: 2 to 8
- Draft: 3 ft 9 in (1.14 m)
- Trapeze: 0-1

Hull
- Type: Monohull
- Construction: GRP
- LOA: 16 ft 4 in (4.98 m)
- Beam: 6 ft 8 in (2.03 m)

Hull appendages
- Keel: Centerboard or keel

Rig
- Rig type: Bermuda

Sails
- Mainsail area: Full sail - 118 sq ft (11.0 m^{2}); Reefed sail - 98 sq ft (9.1 m^{2})
- Jib/genoa area: 41 sq ft (3.8 m^{2})
- Spinnaker area: Optional asymmetric - 150 sq ft (14 m^{2}); Optional symmetric - 113 sq ft (10.5 m^{2})

The RS Venture launched by RS Sailing in 2011 and designed by Phil Morrison is a large, modern GRP dinghy. The design concept was to deliver a large multi-role dinghy suitable for cruising, training or even club racing, in response to growing demand from training centres, private customers and international RS dealers. The RS Venture can take a maximum capacity of 8 crew, however can also be sailed by just 2 making it popular with RYA training schools as well as racing and cruising families. The RS Venture can be purchased from any RS dealer around the world and in 2013 has won Sailing World's Boat of the Year accolade.

== Performance and design ==
The RS Venture is a suitable dinghy for introducing newcomers to the sport of sailing, but is also a good boat to race. The hull is constructed from thick woven GRP skins and 3mm coremat, under a double layered gelcoat. There is the option to have either a standard centreboard or a ballasted centreboard.

== SCS Connect ==
Developed from the ballasted keel option, The SCS (Seated Control System) version is sailed internationally by disabled sailors. In 2024 the World Championships were held at Rutland Water, in the United Kingdom.

The 'Connect' element of the name refers to the electronic control system installed as an option.
