= Tristan Brown =

American soccer player (born 2007)

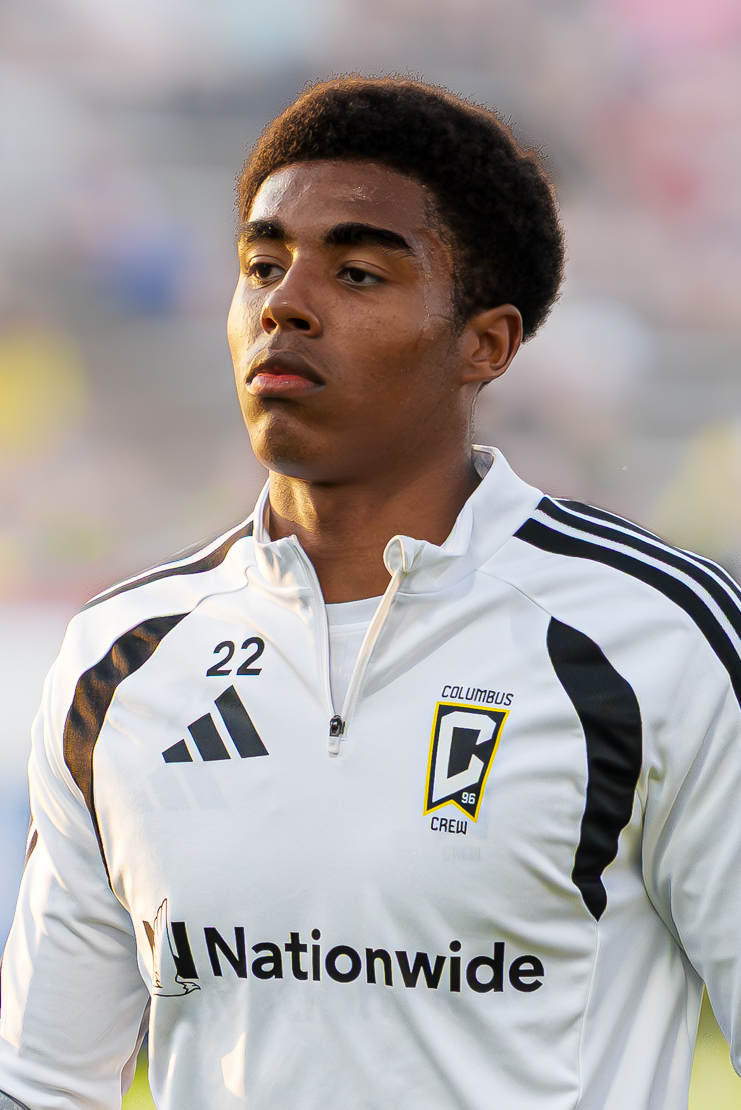
- Brown with Columbus Crew in 2026

Personal information
- Full name: Tristan Alexander Brown
- Date of birth: October 17, 2007 (age 19)
- Place of birth: Novi, Michigan, U.S.
- Position: Wing-back

Team information
- Current team: Columbus Crew
- Number: 22

Youth career
- Waza FC
- –2022: Michigan Wolves
- 2022–2024: Columbus Crew

Senior career*
| Years | Team | Apps | (Gls) |
| 2023– | Columbus Crew 2 | 43 | (2) |
| 2025– | Columbus Crew | 6 | (0) |

International career^{‡}
| 2024 | United States U18 | 2 | (0) |
| 2025– | United States U19 | 1 | (0) |
| 2026– | United States U20 | 4 | (0) |
- * Club domestic league appearances and goals as of 04:32, 8 July 2026 (UTC) ‡ National team caps and goals as of 00:24, September 12, 2026 (UTC)

Tristan Alexander Brown (born October 17, 2007) is an American professional soccer player who plays as a wing-back for Major League Soccer club Columbus Crew.

== Career ==
Born in Novi, Michigan, Brown left for Columbus, Ohio to join the Crew Academy in 2022, initially joining the under-15 team. He made his debut with the reserve team on September 8, 2023, coming on as a second-half substitute. At the start of the 2024 season, Brown signed an amateur contract with the reserves, before signing a professional contract with them on August 23, 2024. He made his U.S. Open Cup debut on March 19, 2025, where he scored his first career goal in a 4–1 victory over NY Renegades FC. He was signed to a first-team contract on June 10, 2025.
