= Monika Mikkola =

Finish sailor

Personal information
- Nationality: Finnish
- Born: 6 July 1996 (age 28); Espoo

Sailing career
- Class: Laser Radial

Monika Mikkola (born 6 July 1996) is a Finnish sailor. She represented her country at the 2024 Summer Olympics in the Laser Radial class. Mikkola has won 4th place at the 2018 World Championship in Århus, Denmark. She won the World U21 Championships in 2016.
