= FarEast 28R =

Fareast 28R
Development
- Designer: Simonis-Voogd
- Year: 2014
- Brand: Far East Boats
- Builder: Fareast Trading LLC

Boat
- Crew: 4-7
- Displacement: 1,173 kg (2,586 lb)
- Draft: 1.75 m (5.7 ft)
- Air draft: 11.71 m (38.4 ft)

Hull
- Type: Monohull
- Construction: GRP
- LOH: 9.07 m (29.8 ft)
- LWL: 8.53 m (28.0 ft)
- Beam: 2.75 m (9.0 ft)

Hull appendages
- Ballast: Approx. 600 kg (1,300 lb)

Rig
- Rig type: Fractional
- I foretriangle height: 3.3 m (11 ft)
- J foretriangle base: 10.65 m (34.9 ft)
- P mainsail luff: 10.25 m (33.6 ft)
- E mainsail foot: 3.75 m (12.3 ft)

Sails
- Mainsail area: 28 m^{2} (300 sq ft)
- Jib/genoa area: 20 m^{2} (220 sq ft)
- Gennaker area: 72 m^{2} (780 sq ft)

The Fareast 28R is a modern sailboat designed by Simonis-Voogd and built by Far East Boats in Jiangsu, China. It features a lifting keel with a lead bulb, a roller furling jib, a bowsprit for an asymmetrical spinnaker, and an open deck. It can be raced with a crew of up to 8.

The Fareast 28R has been recognized with the "2015 Boat of the Year Award" by Sailing World magazine.

== Design Background ==
The Fareast 28R was designed by Simonis-Voogd. The Dutch-South African naval architecture firm, formed by Alexander Simonis and Martin Voogd, has created more than 200 designs for various major builder. The boat was specifically targeted at fleet racing and used recognised brands such as Harken and Selden to reassure customers.

== International One Design ==
The class was recognised by World Sailing in November 2015 as an International Class and is entitled to host one annual World Championship each year with the first held in 2017. In addition the Far East 28r has been used extensively for match and fleet racing events as supplied equipment. It was use in the 2025 Inclusion Sailing World Championships for the blind racing fleet.

== World Championships ==
- 2017 (Malmö, Sweden): Griffon Sailing Marcus Löfgren, Martin Strandberg, Björn Jönsson, Johan Lindell and Henrik Ekström
- 2018 (Fuxian Lake, China): Team RSA Magic, Malcolm HALL Roger Hudson
- 2020 Kiel GER - Cancelled due to COVID
