= Vasileia Karachaliou =

Greek laser radial sailor

Personal information
- Nationality: Greek/Portuguese
- Born: 19 October 1996 (age 29)
- Height: 1.72 m (5 ft 8 in)
- Weight: 62 kg (137 lb)

Sport
- Country: Greece
- Sport: Sailing
- Event: Laser radial
- Club: Piraeus Sailing Club
- Coached by: Tamás Eszes
Medal record
Sailing Athens Eurolymp Week
| Gold medal – first place | 2012 Greece | Laser Radial |
Canarian Olympic Sailing Week
| Gold medal – first place | 2020 Spain | Laser Radial |
| Gold medal – first place | 2017 Spain | Laser Radial |
Sailing European Cup
| Gold medal – first place | 2013 Greece | Laser Radial |
| Bronze medal – third place | 2016 Poland | Laser Radial |
Sailing ASAF Cup - JSAF Enoshima Olympic Week
| Bronze medal – third place | 2017 Japan | Laser Radial |
Sailing Izola Spring Cup
| Silver medal – second place | 2017 Slovenia | Laser Radial |
Sailing World Cup
| Gold medal – first place | 2017 USA | Laser Radial |
| Silver medal – second place | 2017 Spain | Laser Radial |
| Silver medal – second place | 2020 USA | Laser Radial |
| Bronze medal – third place | 2019 USA | Laser Radial |
Sailing European Championships
| Bronze medal – third place | 2017 Spain | Laser Radial |

Vasileia Karachaliou is a Greek laser radial sailor. She won the national championship many times so far. Among all her medals, she has won a gold at the 2017 Sailing World Cup Series Round 1 - Miami and a bronze medal at the 2017 Laser & Laser Radial European Championships Barcelona. In August 2018, she qualified to the 2020 Summer Olympics in Tokyo, Japan. March 23, 2020: she is ranked second in the Laser Radial world rankings.

Competing for Portugal, she won the silver medal at Andora 2023 world championships. In 2023 she affirmed her intention of competing for Portugal.
