= Francesco Marrai =

Italian competitive sailor (born 1993)

Personal information
- Born: 4 February 1993 (age 33)

Sport
- Country: Italy
- Sport: Sailing

Francesco Marrai (born 4 February 1993) is an Italian competitive sailor. He competed at the 2016 Summer Olympics in Rio de Janeiro, in the men's Laser class, finishing 12th.
