= Thorbjørn Schierup =

Danish sailor

Thorbjørn Schierup (born 6 June 1990) is a Danish sailor. He competed at the 2012 Summer Olympics in the Men's Laser class where he placed 19th.
