= Magdalena Kwaśna =

Polish sailor

Personal information
- Nationality: Polish
- Born: 31 March 1998 (age 28) Chojnice, Poland

Sailing career
- Sport: Sailing
- Club: ChKŻ
- Classes: ILCA 6, ILCA 4

Magdalena Kwaśna (born 31 March 1998) is a Polish competitive sailor.

She competed at the 2020 Summer Olympics in Tokyo 2021, in Laser Radial.
