= Elliot Hanson =

British sailor

Personal information
- Full name: Elliot James Hanson
- Nationality: British
- Born: 12 February 1994 (age 32) Macclesfield, England

Sailing career
- Sport: Sailing
- Club: Redesmere Sailing Club
- Class(es): ILCA 7, ILCA 6, Topper
Medal record
Representing United Kingdom
World Championships
Gold medal – first place	2022 Hankø	5.5 Metre
Gold medal – first place	2008 Tralee	Topper
European Championships
Gold medal – first place	2020 Gdańsk	Laser

Elliot James Hanson (born 12 February 1994) is a British professional sailor and Olympian.

He qualified Great Britain to compete in the Laser class at the 2020 Summer Olympics in Tokyo. He went on to represent Great Britain finishing 12th competing in the Laser class. In 2020 he won the Laser European Championships

In 2008 he Won the Topper World Championships and in 2022 he has also won the 2023 5.5 Metre World Championship where he was initial scheduled to crew but he ended up helming.

Hanson is currently ranked 5th in the ILCA 7 World Sailing rankings, placing as the 2nd sailor from Great Britain.
