= Royal Yacht Club Hollandia =

Yacht and rowing club

- Founded: 1881
- Location: , Medemblik, Netherlands
- Website: https://kzrvhollandia.nl/

The Royal Yacht Club Hollandia (Dutch: Koninklijke Zeil- & Roeivereniging Hollandia) often abbreviated to the term KZ&RV Hollandia is a Dutch yacht club and rowing club located in Medemblik in the Netherlands.

== History ==
The yacht club was founded on the 21 June 1882 in Alphen aan den Rijn and later moved to Medemblik in 1964. The predicate 'Royal' was bestowed in 1957. Both the Rowing and Sailing sides of the club have hosted international competition. The sailing side notably hosting World Championship including the Finn, Soling, ILCA, Flying Dutchman, Youth Worlds and many more.

The club benefits from having access to the Regatta Centre Medemblik, a purpose-built sailing facility used for the olympic squad and hosting international events.
