= Mária Érdi =

Hungarian sailor (born 1998)

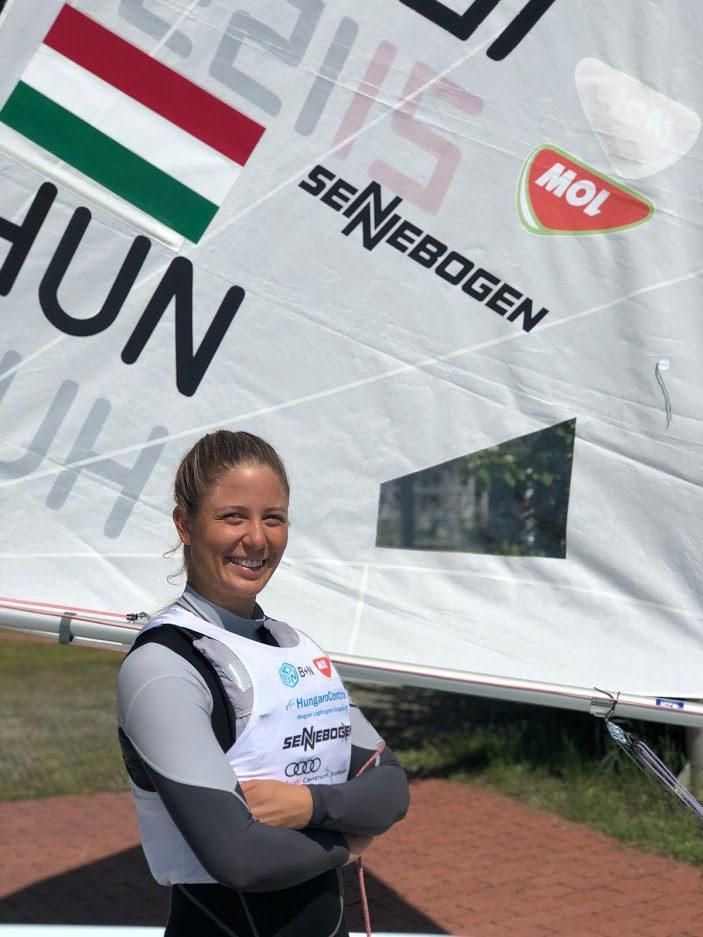

Personal information
- Nationality: Hungarian
- Born: 18 February 1998 (age 28) Budapest, Hungary
- Height: 175 cm (5 ft 9 in)
- Weight: 65 kg (143 lb)

Sailing career
- Sport: Sailing
- Club: MVM SE
- Coached by: Enrico Strazzera
- Classes: ILCA 6, Byte, ILCA 4

Achievements and titles
- Olympic finals: 14ª (2016) - 13ª (2020)
Competition record
Women's sailing
Representing Hungary
Women's ILCA 6 World Championships
Gold medal – first place	2023 The Hague	ILCA 6
ILCA Under 21 World Championships
Gold medal – first place	2017	Laser Radial
Youth World Championships
Gold medal – first place	2015 Langkawi	Laser Radial
Byte World Championship
Bronze medal – third place	2014	Byte CII
ILCA European Championships
Gold medal – first place	2024 Athens	ILCA 6
Bronze medal – third place	2023 Andora	ILCA 6

Mária Érdi (born 18 February 1998) is a Hungarian competitive sailor, 2023 World Champion and 2024 European Champion in the ILCA 6 class.

She has competed in three Olympics

- 14th at 2016 Summer Olympics in Rio de Janeiro, in the female Laser Radial.
- 13th at 2020 Summer Olympics in Tokyo 2021, in female Laser Radial.
- 14th at 2024 Summer Olympics in Marseille 2024, in female Laser Radial.

== Awards ==
In 2023 she was named Hungarian Sportswoman of the Year.
