= Sailing at the 2000 Summer Olympics – Laser =

Sailing at the Olympics

Open One Person Dinghy at the Games of the XXVII Olympiad
- Laser (Standard Rig)
- Venue: Sydney
- Dates: First race: 20 September 2000; Last race: 29 September 2000
- Competitors: 43 from 43 nations
- Teams: 43

Medalists
1st place, gold medalist(s)		Ben Ainslie	Great Britain
2nd place, silver medalist(s)		Robert Scheidt	Brazil
3rd place, bronze medalist(s)		Michael Blackburn	Australia

The Open Single Person Dinghy at the 2000 Summer Olympics was held from 20 to 29 September 2000 in Sydney in Australia. Points were awarded for placement in each race. Eleven races were scheduled and sailed. Each sailor had two discards.

== Results ==
Results of individual races
Rank	Nation	Athlete	1	2	3	4	5	6	7	8	9	10	11	Total	Net
Gold medal	Great Britain	Ben Ainslie	-22	1	1	3	4	4	10	11	4	4	-36	100	42
Silver medal	Brazil	Robert Scheidt	1	2	-22	1	12	1	20	5	1	1	DSQ (-44)	110	44
Bronze medal	Australia	Michael Blackburn	8	8	2	-18	6	5	-22	2	12	3	14	100	60
4	Netherlands	Serge Kats	-29	3	10	7	5	10	-31	19	3	9	6	132	72
5	Austria	Andreas Geritzer	2	11	-38	9	11	7	15	15	DNF (-44)	5	3	160	78
6	Portugal	Gustavo Lima	6	22	4	2	3	18	11	7	OCS (-44)	10	-34	161	83
7	Poland	Maciej Grabowski	11	24	-34	5	2	9	-30	13	9	2	11	150	86
8	Italy	Diego Negri	9	17	-18	11	8	15	1	8	13	-20	9	129	91
9	South Africa	Gareth Blanckenberg	-24	10	-32	6	1	11	4	21	19	12	8	148	92
10	Norway	Peer Moberg	12	7	11	-32	7	6	-24	4	10	22	15	150	94
11	Spain	Luis Martínez	3	-23	16	8	OCS (-44)	23	5	3	16	13	10	164	97
12	United States	John Myrdal	4	20	-39	21	OCS (-44)	2	2	1	2	17	31	183	100
13	Denmark	Peder Rønholt	17	-32	12	4	10	-24	6	9	17	11	17	159	103
14	Sweden	Karl Suneson	10	5	3	24	19	17	8	14	OCS (-44)	DSQ (-44)	7	195	107
15	Greece	Antonios Bougiouris	16	18	8	12	21	8	-32	6	7	15	-22	165	111
16	Belgium	Philippe Bergmans	13	4	24	23	9	19	-25	17	-30	6	1	171	116
17	Finland	Roope Suomalainen	DSQ (-44)	13	5	16	18	3	14	23	-25	19	16	196	127
18	Hungary	Tamás Eszes	5	-26	9	13	DSQ (-44)	14	16	26	5	26	13	197	127
19	Slovenia	Vasilij Žbogar	7	6	30	19	DNF (-44)	-33	12	16	31	16	5	219	142
20	Russia	Vladimir Krutskikh	15	9	15	17	-31	12	19	24	-29	14	18	203	143
21	New Zealand	Peter Fox	14	19	13	OCS (-44)	22	20	7	18	23	8	-24	212	144
22	Malaysia	Kevin Lim	-30	-31	14	14	16	16	13	29	18	23	2	206	145
23	Argentina	Diego Emilio Romero	21	25	23	10	13	21	18	-28	-27	27	4	217	162
24	Canada	Marty Essig	27	16	7	-35	25	13	23	OCS (-44)	26	18	21	255	176
25	Lithuania	Giedrius Gužys	18	-30	-35	22	17	22	26	12	6	25	29	242	177
26	South Korea	Kim Ho-kon	23	15	26	28	-34	-37	28	20	15	7	19	252	181
27	Japan	Kunio Suzuki	-38	12	19	15	32	-36	17	25	24	30	28	276	202
28	Seychelles	Allan Julie	19	21	DSQ (-44)	31	14	26	-38	10	22	28	32	285	203
29	Estonia	Peter Šaraškin	25	29	6	30	28	-32	27	32	OCS (-44)	21	12	286	210
30	Uruguay	Adolfo Carrau	20	-35	29	25	27	27	-33	27	21	29	25	298	230
31	Thailand	Veerasit Puangnak	37	36	28	20	23	38	3	-40	20	-39	33	317	238
32	Belarus	Aleksandr Mumyga	28	27	20	29	20	29	-40	-34	28	32	30	317	243
33	Peru	Luis Alberto Olcese	36	37	21	DSQ (-44)	15	30	37	-38	11	31	35	335	253
34	Turkey	Ali Kemal Tüfekçi	33	-40	33	-37	29	28	36	30	14	24	27	331	254
35	Cuba	José Urbay	32	14	-37	27	37	31	35	22	OCS (-44)	35	26	340	259
36	Netherlands Antilles	Cor van Aanholt	34	28	OCS (-44)	38	35	-41	21	36	8	37	23	345	260
37	Malta	Mario Aquilina	-40	-41	25	33	30	35	9	35	32	36	37	353	272
38	Singapore	Stanley Tan	35	-38	36	26	26	34	-39	31	33	34	20	352	275
39	Antigua and Barbuda	Karl James	26	34	27	34	-38	25	29	33	35	-38	38	357	281
40	Cyprus	Aimilios Oikonomidis	39	39	17	-40	33	-40	34	37	34	33	39	385	305
41	Guam	Brett Gumi Chivers	31	33	40	36	24	39	DNC (-44)	DNC (-44)	DNC (44)	DNC (44)	DNC (44)	423	335
42	Iceland	Hafsteinn Geirsson	41	42	31	39	36	42	41	39	OCS (-44)	DNF (-44)	DNC (44)	443	355
43	Croatia	Mate Arapov	RET (-44)	RET (-44)	RET (44)	RET (44)	RET (44)	RET (44)	RET (44)	RET (44)	RET (44)	RET (44)	RET (44)	484	396

== Notes ==
Points are assigned based on the finishing position in each race (1 for first, 2 for second, etc.). The points are totalled from the top 9 results of the 11 races, with lower totals being better. If a sailor was disqualified or did not complete the race, 44 points are assigned for that race (as there were 43 sailors in this competition).

Scoring abbreviations are defined as follows:

- OCS – On course side of the starting line
- DSQ – Disqualified
- DNF – Did Not Finish
- DNS – Did Not Start
- RDG – Redress Given

== Sources ==
Results and weather take from https://web.archive.org/web/20050825083600/http://www.sailing.org/olympics2000/info2000/
