= 1998 ISAF Youth Sailing World Championships – Laser =

Laser at the 1998 ISAF Youth Sailing World Championships
- Venue: Simon's Town, South Africa
- Dates: 28 December 1998 - 5 January 1999

Medalists
gold medal	Gareth Blanckenberg	South Africa
silver medal	Marin Misura	Croatia
bronze medal	Francisco Sanchez Ferrer	Spain

The Laser Radial competition at the 1998 ISAF Youth Sailing World Championships took place from 28 December 1998 to 5 January 1999. 33 sailors competed, with South African Gareth Blanckenberg winning the event.

== Results ==
Pos	Helm	Country	R1	R2	R3	R4	R5	R6	R7	R8	R9	R10	R11	Total	Nett
1	Gareth Blanckenberg	South Africa	3	2	(7)	1	1	(7)	1	7	3	2	7	41	27
2	Marin Misura	Croatia	1	9	2	(11)	7	4	(9)	4	5	7	5	64	44
3	Francisco Sanchez Ferrer	Spain	7	8	1	(10)	2	(12)	2	8	2	6	10	68	46
4	Alastair Gair	New Zealand	9	3	5	5	4	8	(10)	(14)	1	10	3	72	48
5	Miguel Poli	Argentina	6	6	6	2	5	2	4	9	(10)	(11)	8	69	48
6	Josh Beaver	Australia	(34 DSQ)	1	(34 DSQ)	12	6	1	11	11	8	1	2	121	53
7	Matthew Howard	United Kingdom	2	5	10	3	3	16	(34)	12	15	3	6	109	75
8	Daniel Hannemann	Germany	4	4	3	(25)	8	11	5	(26)	18	5	9	118	67
9	Joonas Päivärinta	Finland	13	7	4	13	9	3	(34)	10	7	9	13	122	88
10	Kristian Aderman	Sweden	(15)	12	(22)	4	10	9	15	3	11	8	4	113	76
11	Evangelos Cheimonas	Greece	10	13	9	(14)	12	6	(18)	2	14	13	11	122	90
12	Jonas Høgh-Christensen	Denmark	5	10	17	6	(34 DSQ)	5	(21)	16	21	12	1	148	93
13	Félix Pruvot	France	14	17	(23)	16	16	10	(20)	1	6	4	12	139	96
14	Marcin Rudawski	Poland	11	14	(15)	8	11	14	6	13	4	(22)	15	133	96
15	Mathias Rocha Ostergren	Brazil	(18)	(22)	8	7	15	17	3	5	9	17	18	139	99
16	Joao Silva	Portugal	8	16	19	9	14	13	(34 OCS)	6	(22)	21	16	178	122
17	Joel Hanneman	United States	17	11	11	(29)	18	25	14	(27)	12	14	14	192	136
18	Richard Honeyford	Ireland	12	19	16	(26)	13	15	7	17	17	23	(24)	189	139
19	Loic Dumonceau	Belgium	19	18	13	19	21	(26)	8	24	(25)	19	21	213	162
20	Taylor Larangie	Canada	16	23	(27)	15	20	19	22	15	(26)	15	17	215	162
21	Arne Nieuwenhuys	Netherlands	(23)	15	20	18	(22)	20	16	19	16	20	22	211	166
22	Martin Mehus	Norway	26	21	12	21	19	23	(34)	(34 DNC)	13	16	23	242	174
23	Joel Mattle	Switzerland	20	20	(28)	24	24	18	12	20	(27)	18	19	230	175
24	Leonid Dzubenko	Ukraine	21	(28)	14	17	(26)	21	24	22	19	25	25	242	188
25	Enrico Benzi	Italy	24	26	25	20	17	22	13	(31)	23	(29)	20	250	190
26	Shingo Watanabe	Japan	25	(27)	21	22	25	(28)	17	23	24	26	27	265	210
27	Sandeep Srikanth	India	22	30	(32)	(31)	23	24	23	21	28	24	28	286	223
28	Jan Butka	Czech Republic	27	29	18	23	27	27	26	18	30	(31)	(31)	287	225
29	Ron Brown	Israel	28	24	26	28	28	(30)	19	28	20	27	(29)	287	228
30	Santiago Silveira	Uruguay	30	25	24	27	29	29	27	29	(33)	32	(33)	318	252
31	Andre Mitzkewich	Guam	29	(32)	30	(33)	30	31	25	30	31	28	26	325	260
32	Richard Davison	Zimbabwe	31	31	29	30	31	(32)	28	25	29	30	(32)	328	264
33	Dennis Bwye	Kenya	32	(33)	31	32	31	(33)	29	32	32	33	30	348	282
