= Rodney Davies (disambiguation) =

Rodney Davies is a rugby union player.

Rodney Davies may also refer to:

- Rod Davies (1930–2015), radio astronomer
- Rod Davies (sailor) (born 1969), Canadian Olympic sailor
- Rodney Mark Davies, writer of the song "Breathe You In"

== See also ==
- Rodney Davis (disambiguation)
