= Sailing at the 1996 Summer Olympics – Laser =

Sailing at the Olympics

Open One Person Dinghy at the Games of the XXVI Olympiad
- Laser (Standard Rig)
- Venue: Savannah
- Dates: 23 July to 31 July
- Competitors: 56 from 56 nations
- Teams: 56

Medalists
1st place, gold medalist(s)		Robert Scheidt	Brazil
2nd place, silver medalist(s)		Ben Ainslie	Great Britain
3rd place, bronze medalist(s)		Peer Moberg	Norway

The Laser Competition was a sailing event on the program at the 1996 Summer Olympics that was held from 23 July to 31 July 1996, in Savannah, Georgia, United States. Points were awarded for placement in each race. Eleven races were scheduled and sailed. Each sailor had two discards.

== Results ==
Rank	Helmsman (Country)	Race I		Race II		Race III		Race IV		Race V		Race VI		Race VII		Race VIII		Race IX		Race X		Race XI		Total Points	Total -1
Rank	Helmsman (Country)	Rank	Points	Rank	Points	Rank	Points	Rank	Points	Rank	Points	Rank	Points	Rank	Points	Rank	Points	Rank	Points	Rank	Points	Rank	Points	Total Points	Total -1
1st place, gold medalist(s)	Robert Scheidt (BRA)	2	2.0	~~9~~	~~9.0~~	3	3.0	6	6.0	1	1.0	3	3.0	7	7.0	2	2.0	1	1.0	1	1.0	~~DSQ~~	~~57.0~~	92.0	26.0
2nd place, silver medalist(s)	Ben Ainslie (GBR)	~~28~~	~~28.0~~	4	4.0	7	7.0	2	2.0	2	2.0	1	1.0	2	2.0	1	1.0	16	16.0	2	2.0	~~DSQ~~	~~57.0~~	122.0	37.0
3rd place, bronze medalist(s)	Peer Moberg (NOR)	1	1.0	7	7.0	9	9.0	1	1.0	9	9.0	10	10.0	1	1.0	~~21~~	~~21.0~~	3	3.0	5	5.0	~~11~~	~~11.0~~	78.0	46.0
4	Michael Blackburn (AUS)	5	5.0	6	6.0	6	6.0	~~22~~	~~22.0~~	10	10.0	~~22~~	~~22.0~~	5	5.0	4	4.0	7	7.0	4	4.0	1	1.0	92.0	48.0
5	Stefan Warkalla (GER)	13	13.0	2	2.0	2	2.0	3	3.0	12	12.0	4	4.0	~~15~~	~~15.0~~	6	6.0	5	5.0	7	7.0	~~DSQ~~	~~57.0~~	126.0	54.0
6	John Harrysson (SWE)	3	3.0	8	8.0	8	8.0	~~33~~	~~33.0~~	4	4.0	6	6.0	~~20~~	~~20.0~~	7	7.0	9	9.0	8	8.0	2	2.0	108.0	55.0
7	Vasco Serpa (POR)	8	8.0	3	3.0	10	10.0	~~PMS~~	~~57.0~~	3	3.0	9	9.0	11	11.0	11	11.0	12	12.0	~~16~~	~~16.0~~	7	7.0	147.0	74.0
8	Thomas Johanson (FIN)	~~18~~	~~18.0~~	14	14.0	4	4.0	8	8.0	11	11.0	13	13.0	6	6.0	~~15~~	~~15.0~~	4	4.0	13	13.0	5	5.0	111.0	78.0
9	Santiago Lange (ARG)	4	4.0	1	1.0	5	5.0	14	14.0	23	23.0	11	11.0	~~19~~	19.0	~~DSQ~~	~~57.0~~	2	2.0	19	19.0	4	4.0	159.0	79.0
10	Hamish Pepper (NZL)	15	15.0	~~PMS~~	~~57.0~~	19	19.0	19	19.0	6	6.0	2	2.0	4	4.0	3	3.0	~~21~~	~~21.0~~	6	6.0	10	10.0	162.0	84.0
11	Mark Lyttle (IRL)	~~DSQ~~	~~57.0~~	13	13.0	1	1.0	9	9.0	14	14.0	5	5.0	8	8.0	~~DSQ~~	~~57.0~~	10	10.0	10	10.0	18	18.0	202.0	88.0
12	Francesco Bruni (ITA)	12	12.0	5	5.0	11	11.0	4	4.0	~~24~~	~~24.0~~	20	20.0	~~PMS~~	~~57.0~~	10	10.0	8	8.0	3	3.0	17	17.0	171.0	90.0
13	Serge Kats (NED)	6	6.0	~~PMS~~	~~57.0~~	12	12.0	13	13.0	5	5.0	7	7.0	22	22.0	~~DSQ~~	~~57.0~~	19	19.0	11	11.0	3	3.0	212.0	98.0
14	Franz Urlesberger (AUT)	19	19.0	~~30~~	~~30.0~~	15	15.0	16	16.0	16	16.0	~~23~~	~~23.0~~	14	14.0	12	12.0	6	6.0	9	9.0	15	15.0	175.0	122.0
15	Guillaume Florent (FRA)	7	7.0	17	17.0	14	14.0	12	12.0	~~25~~	~~25.0~~	21	21.0	21	21.0	8	8.0	14	14.0	22	22.0	~~DSQ~~	~~57.0~~	218.0	136.0
16	Dave Hibberd (RSA)	10	10.0	10	10.0	20	20.0	20	20.0	8	8.0	17	17.0	~~31~~	~~31.0~~	13	13.0	~~29~~	~~29.0~~	18	18.0	22	22.0	198.0	138.0
17	Jens Eckardt (DEN)	~~31~~	~~31.0~~	16	16.0	17	17.0	11	11.0	7	7.0	8	8.0	26	26.0	17	17.0	13	13.0	27	27.0	~~DNF~~	~~57.0~~	230.0	142.0
18	Philippe Bergmans (BEL)	11	11.0	11	11.0	~~25~~	~~25.0~~	10	10.0	20	20.0	15	15.0	~~25~~	~~25.0~~	22	22.0	28	28.0	24	24.0	6	6.0	197.0	144.0
19	Luis Echenique (CHI)	20	20.0	~~PMS~~	~~57.0~~	~~31~~	~~31.0~~	15	15.0	18	18.0	16	16.0	9	9.0	26	26.0	31	31.0	15	15.0	8	8.0	246.0	158.0
20	Aleksandr Zelenovsky (BLR)	~~38~~	~~38.0~~	23	23.0	~~28~~	~~28.0~~	26	26.0	21	21.0	18	18.0	13	13.0	16	16.0	15	15.0	17	17.0	14	14.0	229.0	163.0
21	Nick Adamson (USA)	9	9.0	~~DSQ~~	~~57.0~~	13	13.0	7	7.0	13	13.0	14	14.0	10	10.0	~~DSQ~~	~~57.0~~	27	27.0	14	14.0	DSQ	57.0	278.0	164.0
22	Antón Garrote (ESP)	17	17.0	15	15.0	18	18.0	~~36~~	~~36.0~~	26	26.0	31	31.0	18	18.0	18	18.0	17	17.0	12	12.0	~~DSQ~~	~~57.0~~	265.0	172.0
23	Kim Ho-kon (KOR)	16	16.0	18	18.0	~~30~~	~~30.0~~	5	5.0	15	15.0	12	12.0	35	35.0	28	28.0	~~32~~	~~32.0~~	26	26.0	23	23.0	240.0	173.0
24	Peter Šaraškin (EST)	14	14.0	27	27.0	21	21.0	29	29.0	~~30~~	~~30.0~~	~~33~~	~~33.0~~	12	12.0	14	14.0	18	18.0	21	21.0	20	20.0	239.0	176.0
25	Robert Hirst (IVB)	~~39~~	~~39.0~~	19	19.0	29	29.0	17	17.0	31	31.0	25	25.0	~~32~~	~~32.0~~	9	9.0	20	20.0	30	30.0	12	12.0	263.0	192.0
26	Rod Davies (CAN)	22	22.0	~~PMS~~	~~57.0~~	24	24.0	25	25.0	17	17.0	~~28~~	~~28.0~~	23	23.0	25	25.0	26	26.0	23	23.0	9	9.0	279.0	194.0
27	Dimitrios Theodorakis (GRE)	21	21.0	28	28.0	16	16.0	18	18.0	~~33~~	~~33.0~~	26	26.0	28	28.0	20	20.0	~~25~~	~~25.0~~	25	25.0	24	24.0	264.0	203.0
28	Tomoyuki Sasaki (JPN)	24	24.0	22	22.0	22	22.0	21	21.0	19	19.0	19	19.0	~~42~~	~~42.0~~	~~31~~	~~31.0~~	30	30.0	29	29.0	26	26.0	285.0	212.0
29	Andrey Kirilyuk (RUS)	~~36~~	~~36.0~~	25	25.0	26	26.0	31	31.0	~~32~~	~~32.0~~	24	24.0	29	29.0	19	19.0	22	22.0	20	20.0	16	16.0	280.0	212.0
30	Ricardo Fabini (URU)	25	25.0	12	12.0	~~38~~	~~38.0~~	23	23.0	22	22.0	32	32.0	16	16.0	30	30.0	35	35.0	~~DSQ~~	~~57.0~~	21	21.0	311.0	216.0
31	Tamás Eszes (HUN)	~~DSQ~~	~~57.0~~	20	20.0	33	33.0	~~43~~	~~43.0~~	37	37.0	30	30.0	27	27.0	5	5.0	11	11.0	28	28.0	DSQ	57.0	348.0	234.0
32	Cao Xiaobo (CHN)	30	30.0	24	24.0	~~32~~	~~32.0~~	28	28.0	28	28.0	29	29.0	30	30.0	27	27.0	~~38~~	~~38.0~~	32	32.0	13	13.0	311.0	241.0
33	Antonio Goeters (MEX)	34	34.0	38	38.0	~~42~~	~~42.0~~	30	30.0	~~43~~	~~43.0~~	36	36.0	17	17.0	24	24.0	23	23.0	33	33.0	30	30.0	350.0	265.0
34	Paul Dielemans (AHO)	33	33.0	21	21.0	23	23.0	~~42~~	~~42.0~~	29	29.0	27	27.0	39	39.0	35	35.0	24	24.0	36	36.0	~~DSQ~~	~~57.0~~	366.0	267.0
35	Rodion Luka (UKR)	27	27.0	34	34.0	43	43.0	37	37.0	~~44~~	~~44.0~~	34	34.0	3	3.0	23	23.0	36	36.0	37	37.0	~~DSQ~~	~~57.0~~	375.0	274.0
36	Ben Tan (SIN)	~~41~~	~~41.0~~	~~PMS~~	~~57.0~~	34	34.0	24	24.0	27	27.0	35	35.0	38	38.0	37	37.0	39	39.0	31	31.0	19	19.0	382.0	284.0
37	Kevin Lim (MAS)	32	32.0	26	26.0	36	36.0	34	34.0	35	35.0	39	39.0	~~48~~	~~48.0~~	33	33.0	40	40.0	~~41~~	~~41.0~~	25	25.0	389.0	300.0
38	Allan Julie (SEY)	YMP	22.0	36	36.0	27	27.0	~~DNF~~	~~57.0~~	38	38.0	44	44.0	~~47~~	~~47.0~~	42	42.0	34	34.0	35	35.0	27	27.0	409.0	305.0
39	John van Batenburg Stafford (CAY)	37	37.0	29	29.0	44	44.0	27	27.0	34	34.0	38	38.0	41	41.0	36	36.0	~~52~~	~~52.0~~	~~45~~	~~45.0~~	32	32.0	415.0	318.0
40	Alp Alpagut (TUR)	35	35.0	32	32.0	37	37.0	~~40~~	~~40.0~~	40	40.0	40	40.0	40	40.0	~~41~~	~~41.0~~	33	33.0	38	38.0	33	33.0	409.0	328.0
41	John Tabone (MLT)	26	26.0	39	39.0	35	35.0	44	44.0	~~49~~	~~49.0~~	42	42.0	33	33.0	38	38.0	~~46~~	~~46.0~~	46	46.0	34	34.0	432.0	337.0
42	Malcolm Smith (BER)	40	40.0	31	31.0	41	41.0	32	32.0	42	42.0	~~45~~	~~45.0~~	~~46~~	~~46.0~~	40	40.0	43	43.0	34	34.0	35	35.0	429.0	338.0
43	Karl James (ANT)	45	45.0	35	35.0	39	39.0	35	35.0	39	39.0	~~DNF~~	~~57.0~~	34	34.0	45	45.0	~~49~~	~~49.0~~	40	40.0	28	28.0	446.0	340.0
44	Brett Chivers (GUM)	29	29.0	37	37.0	~~50~~	~~50.0~~	~~45~~	~~45.0~~	36	36.0	37	37.0	45	45.0	44	44.0	44	44.0	39	39.0	29	29.0	435.0	340.0
45	Michael Green (LCA)	~~42~~	~~42.0~~	40	40.0	40	40.0	38	38.0	41	41.0	41	41.0	37	37.0	32	32.0	42	42.0	~~44~~	~~44.0~~	31	31.0	428.0	342.0
46	Yang Fung (HKG)	44	44.0	33	33.0	47	47.0	39	39.0	~~46~~	~~46.0~~	43	43.0	44	44.0	29	29.0	~~47~~	~~47.0~~	43	43.0	36	36.0	451.0	357.0
47	Robert Dunkley (BAH)	~~48~~	~~48.0~~	41	41.0	~~46~~	~~46.0~~	41	41.0	45	45.0	46	46.0	43	43.0	43	43.0	41	41.0	42	42.0	37	37.0	473.0	379.0
48	Horia Ispaș (ROM)	43	43.0	43	43.0	49	49.0	~~DNF~~	~~57.0~~	47	47.0	~~DNF~~	~~57.0~~	24	24.0	DSQ	57.0	45	45.0	48	48.0	38	38.0	508.0	394.0
49	Khalifa Al-Hitmi (QAT)	46	46.0	42	42.0	45	45.0	~~DNF~~	~~57.0~~	48	48.0	~~DNF~~	~~57.0~~	DSQ	57.0	34	34.0	37	37.0	47	47.0	41	41.0	511.0	397.0
50	Gastón Vedani (ECU)	47	47.0	44	44.0	48	48.0	48	48.0	~~50~~	~~50.0~~	~~DNF~~	~~57.0~~	36	36.0	39	39.0	48	48.0	50	50.0	39	39.0	506.0	399.0
51	Mohamed Al-Sada (BRN)	50	50.0	45	45.0	51	51.0	47	47.0	~~DNF~~	~~57.0~~	~~DNS~~	~~57.0~~	50	50.0	47	47.0	50	50.0	49	49.0	40	40.0	543.0	429.0
52	Rodney Reader (BAR)	52	52.0	47	47.0	52	52.0	46	46.0	52	52.0	~~DNF~~	~~57.0~~	~~PMS~~	~~57.0~~	48	48.0	54	54.0	51	51.0	42	42.0	558.0	444.0
53	Constantino Scarpetta (PAR)	51	51.0	46	46.0	53	53.0	~~DNF~~	~~57.0~~	51	51.0	~~DNF~~	~~57.0~~	DSQ	57.0	46	46.0	51	51.0	52	52.0	43	43.0	564.0	450.0
54	Tiko Crofoot (FIJ)	YMP	48.0	49	49.0	54	54.0	~~DNF~~	~~57.0~~	53	53.0	~~DNF~~	~~57.0~~	PMS	57.0	51	51.0	53	53.0	54	54.0	44	44.0	577.0	463.0
55	Mohamed Youssouf (DJI)	53	53.0	48	48.0	56	56.0	~~DNF~~	~~57.0~~	~~DNF~~	~~57.0~~	DNS	57.0	51	51.0	50	50.0	56	56.0	53	53.0	45	45.0	583.0	469.0
56	Luca Belluzzi (SMR)	54	54.0	~~DNF~~	~~57.0~~	55	55.0	~~DNF~~	~~57.0~~	DNC	57.0	DNC	57.0	49	49.0	49	49.0	55	55.0	55	55.0	46	46.0	591.0	477.0

=== Daily standings ===
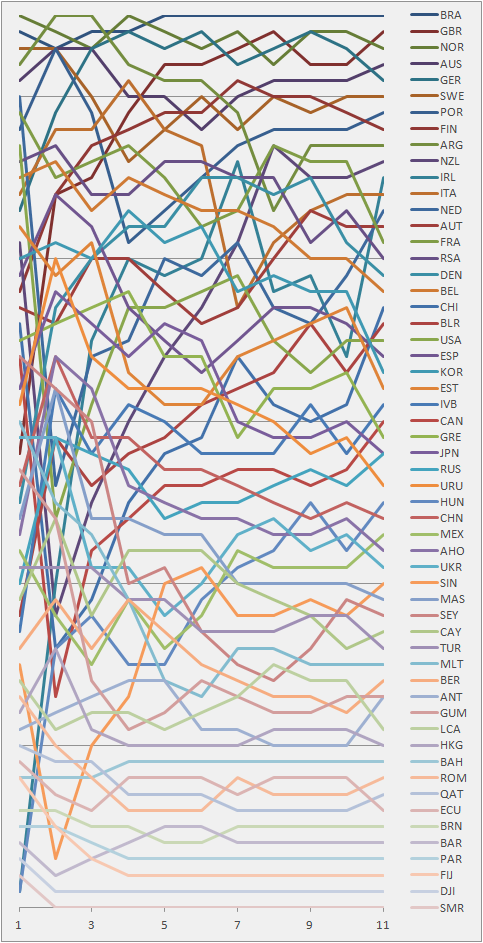
Graph showing the daily standings in the Laser during the 1996 Summer Olympics

== Conditions at the Laser course areas ==
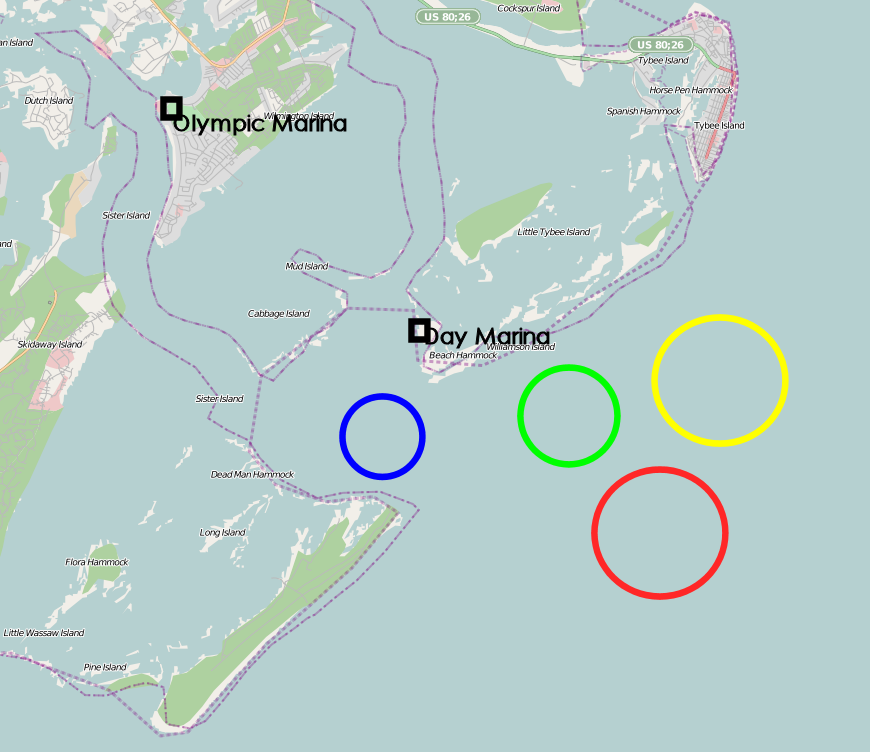
Black: Marinas
Blue: Alpha course
Green: Bravo course
Yellow: Charly course
Red: Delta course

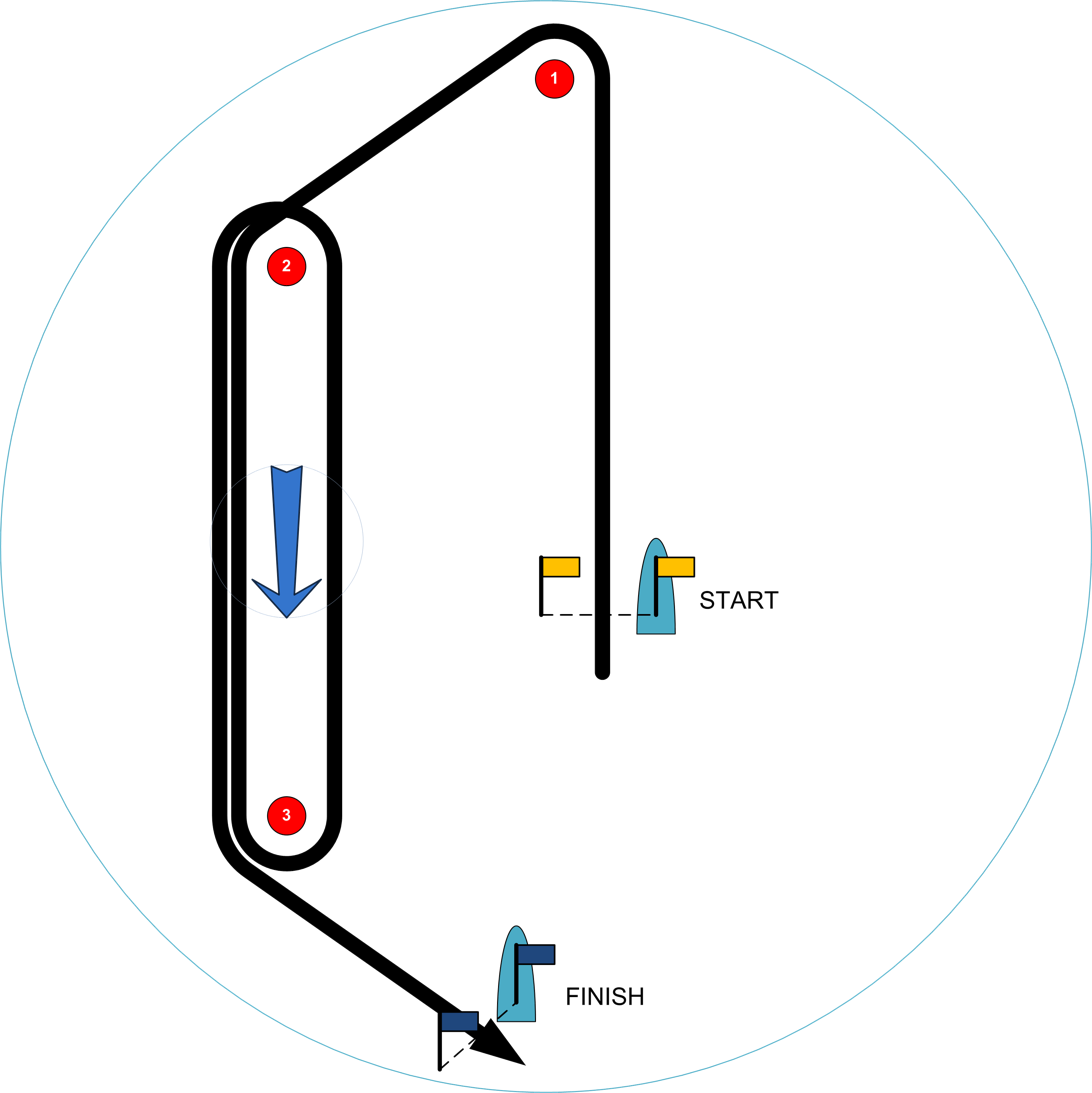
Olympic course ZO.
S(Start) - 1 - 2 - 3 - 2 - 3 - F(Finish reaching)

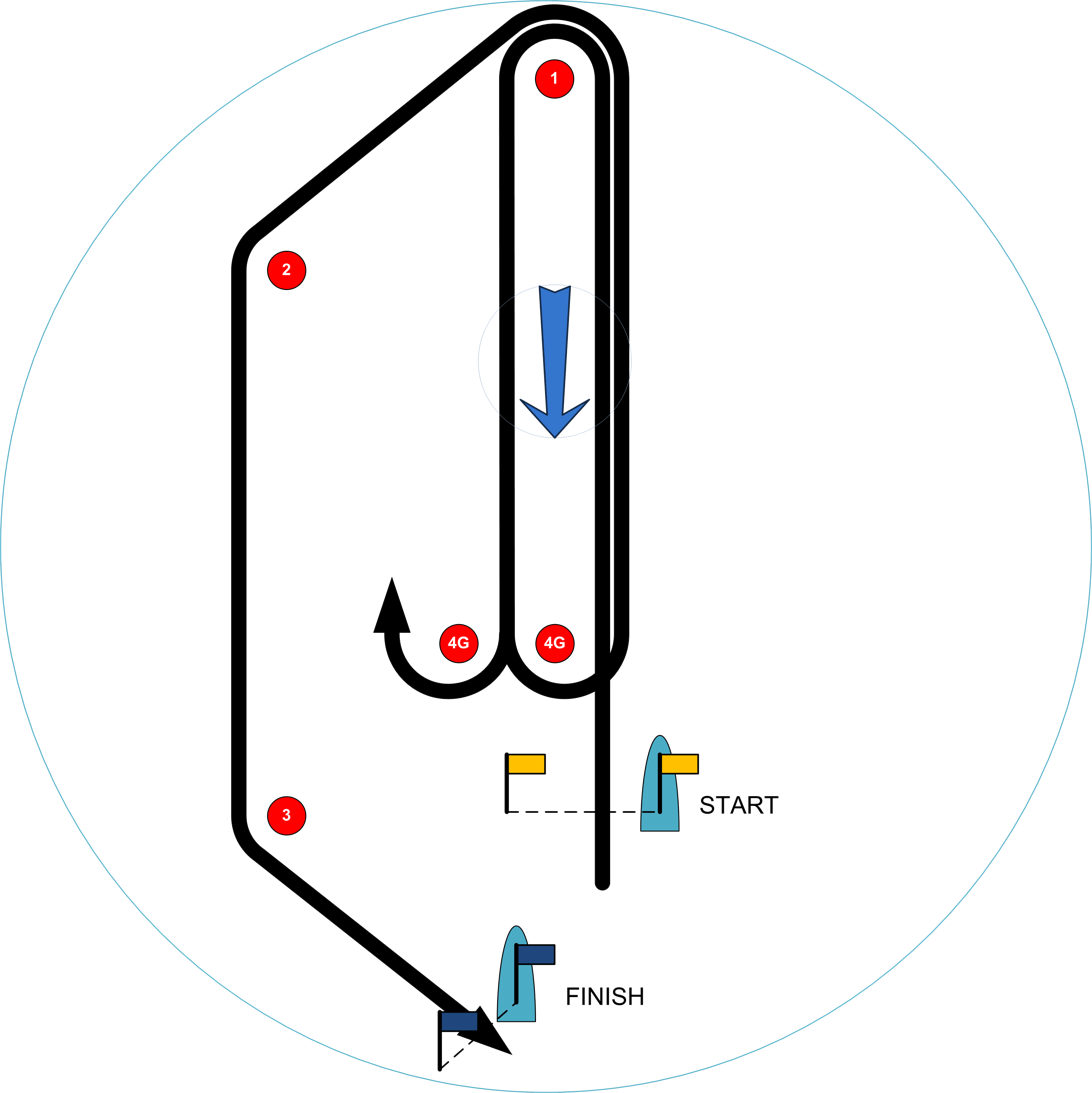
Olympic course ZI.
S(Start) - 1 - 4G - 1 - 2 - 3 - F(Finish reaching)

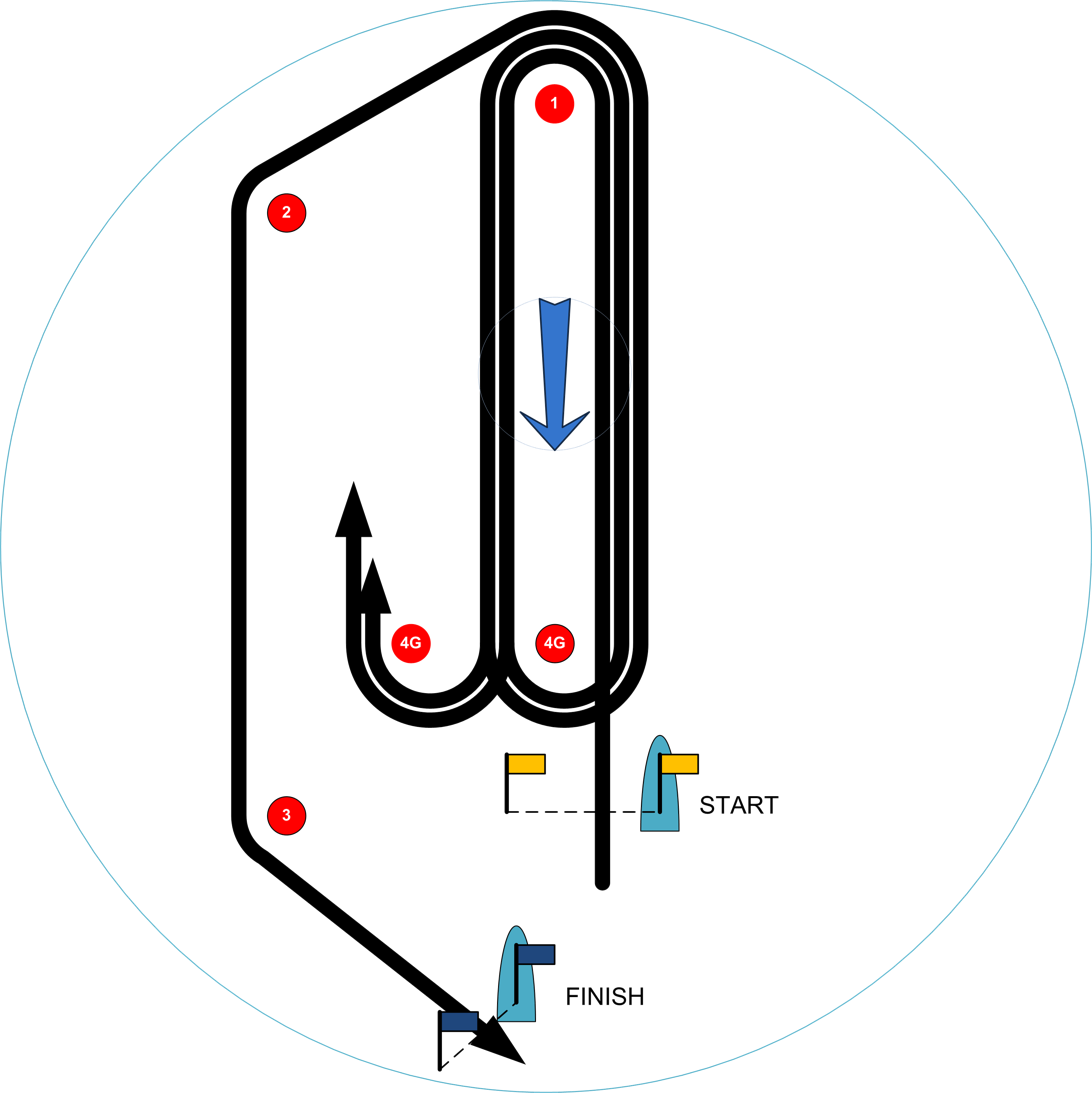
Olympic course XI.
S(Start) - 1 - 4G - 1 - 4G - 1 - 2 - 3 - F(Finish reaching)

Date	Race	°C	Knot	Meter	Course	Course area
23 July 1996	I	29	10	0.8		Bravo
23 July 1996	II	29	16	0.7	ZI	Bravo
24 July 1996	III	28	11	0.7		Bravo
24 July 1996	IV	29	14	0.8		Bravo
25 July 1996	V	29	13	0.7	ZI	Bravo
25 July 1996	VI	29	19	0.1	ZI	Bravo
26 July 1996	VII	26	4	0.4	ZO	Bravo
26 July 1996	VIII	27	10	0.5	ZO	Bravo
29 July 1996	IX	28	11	0.6	XI	Bravo
29 July 1996	X	28	11	0.4	XI	Bravo
31 July 1996	XI	28	10	0.6	ZI	Bravo
