= Sailing at the 2003 Games of the Small States of Europe =

== Medalists ==
Event	Gold		Silver		Bronze	
Laser Radial	Andrea Orlando (MON)	18	Peter Valentino (MLT)	19	Angelos Coosgrove (CYP)	20
Laser Standard	Mario Aquilina (MLT)	15	Damien Desprat Lerale (MON)	16	Hafsteinn Geirsson (ISL)	23
Optimist	Matthieu Mariani (MON)	10	Benji Borg (MLT)	10	Matthew Fleri Soler (MLT)	25

== Medal table ==
* Host nation (Malta)

Rank	Nation	Gold	Silver	Bronze	Total
1	Monaco (MON)	2	1	0	3
2	Malta (MLT)*	1	2	1	4
3	Cyprus (CYP)	0	0	1	1
3	Iceland (ISL)	0	0	1	1
Totals (4 entries)		3	3	3	9
