= Alpagut =

Alpagut or Alpağut may refer:

== Places in Turkey ==
- Alpagut, Dodurga
- Alpagut, Elâzığ
- Alpagut, Ilgaz
- Alpagut, Kazan, a village in the district of Kazan, Ankara Province
- Alpağut, Keles
- Alpagut, Kızılcahamam, a village in the district of Kızılcahamam, Ankara Province
- Alpagut, Lapseki
- Alpağut, Nallıhan, a village in the district of Nallıhan, Ankara Province
- Alpağut, Bilecik, a village in the district of Bilecik, Bilecik Province
- Alpagut, Mudurnu, a village in the district of Mudurnu, Bolu Province
- Alpagut, Mustafakemalpaşa
- Alpagut, Mihalgazi, a small town in Mihalgazi district of Eskişehir Province
- Alpagut, Seben
- Alpağut, Kastamonu, a village in the district of Kastamonu, Kastamonu Province

== People with the surname ==
- Alp Alpagut, (born 1974), Turkish Olympic sailor
