= Rod Davis =

Rod Davis is the name of:

- Rod Davis (gridiron football) (born 1981), American gridiron football linebacker
- Rod Davis (sailor) (born 1955), American born Olympic sailor who competed for the United States and New Zealand
- Rod Davis (musician), member of British skiffle and rock 'n' roll group The Quarrymen

== See also ==
- Rodney Davis (disambiguation)
- Rod Davies (1930–2015), British astronomer
