= Sailing at the 2008 Summer Olympics – Laser =

Men's Laser at the Games of the XXIX Olympiad
- Line drawing of the Laser
- Venue: Qingdao International Sailing Centre
- Dates: First race: 12 August 2008; Last race: 19 August 2008
- Competitors: 43 from 43 nations

Medalists
1st place, gold medalist(s)		Paul Goodison	Great Britain
2nd place, silver medalist(s)		Vasilij Žbogar	Slovenia
3rd place, bronze medalist(s)		Diego Romero	Italy

The Laser was a sailing event on the Sailing at the 2008 Summer Olympics program in Qingdao International Sailing Centre. Eleven races (last one a medal race) were scheduled. Only ten races were completed including the medal race due to lack of wind. 43 sailors, on 43 boats, from 43 nations competed. Ten boats qualified for the medal race.

== Race schedule ==
●	Practice race	●	Race on Yellow	●	Race on Green	●	Medal race on Yellow

Date	August																	
Date	7 Thu	8 Fri	9 Sat	10 Sun	11 Mon	12 Tue	13 Wed	14 Thu	15 Fri	16 Sat	17 Sun	18 Mon	19 Tue	20 Wed	21 Thu	22 Fri	23 Sat	24 Sun
Men's Laser					PR	S1,2	S3	No wind	S4	S5	S6	S7,8,9	MR					

== Course areas and course configurations ==
For the Laser course areas A (Yellow) and C (Green) were used. The location (36°1'26"’N, 120°26'52"E) points to the center of the 0.6nm radius Yellow course area and the location (36°2'44"N, 120°28'9"E) points to the center of the 0.75nm radius Green course area. The target time for the course was about 60 minutes for the races and 30 minutes for the medal race. The race management could choose from several course configurations.

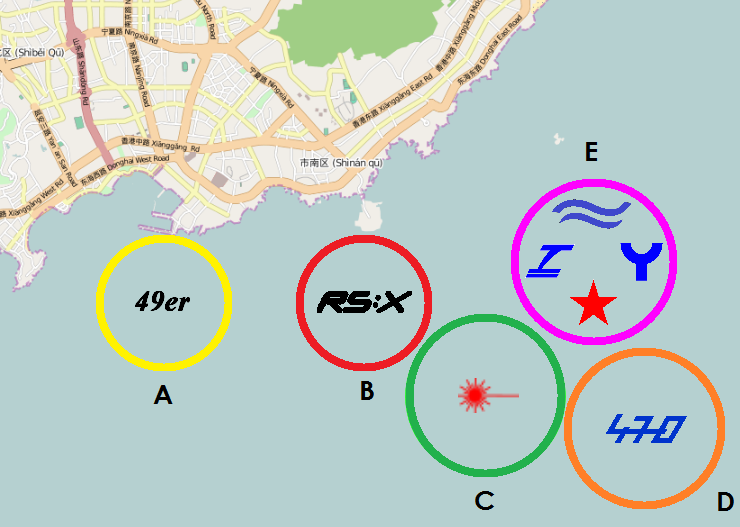
Course Areas

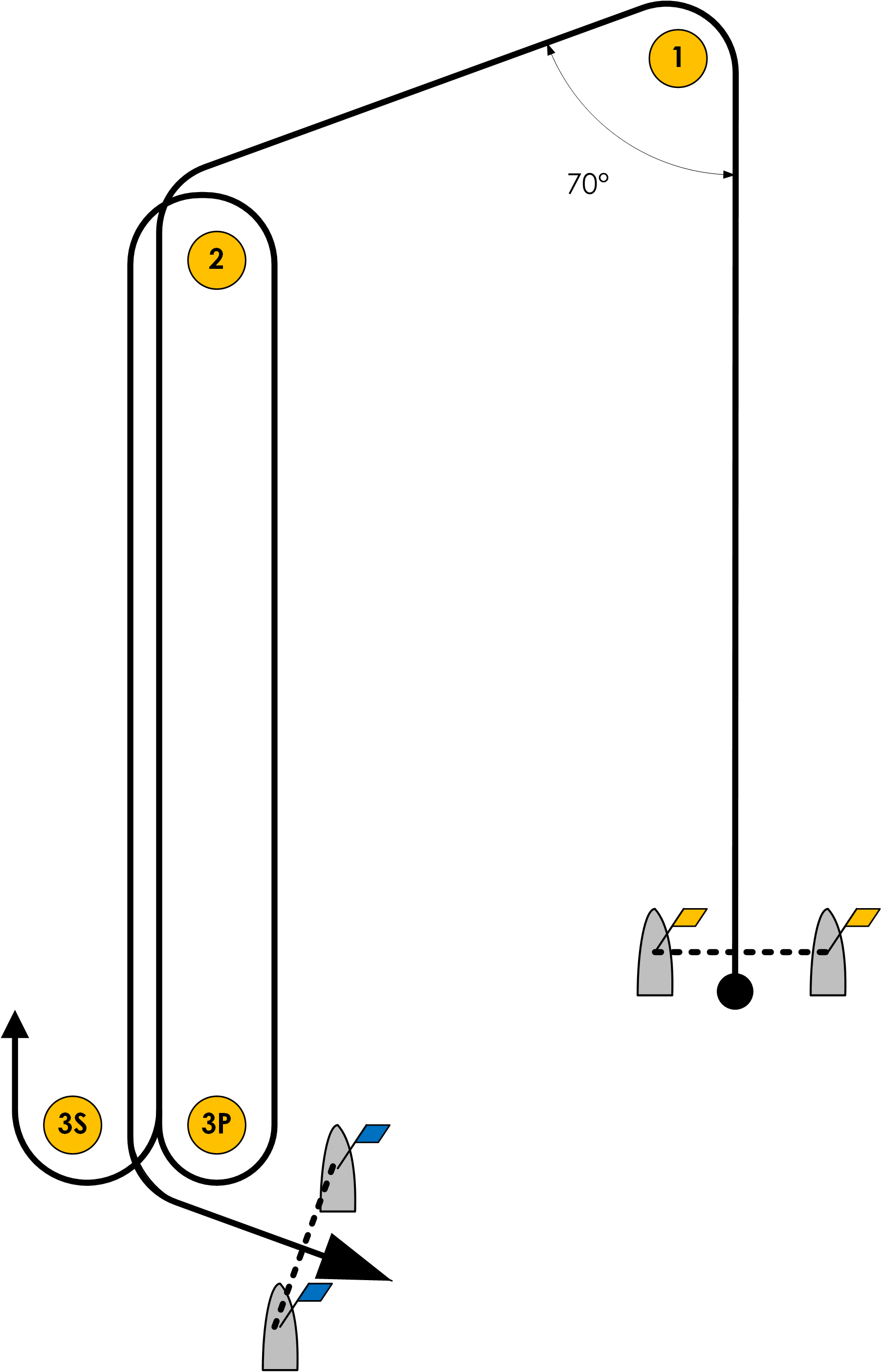
70° Trapezoid Outer Course (O)

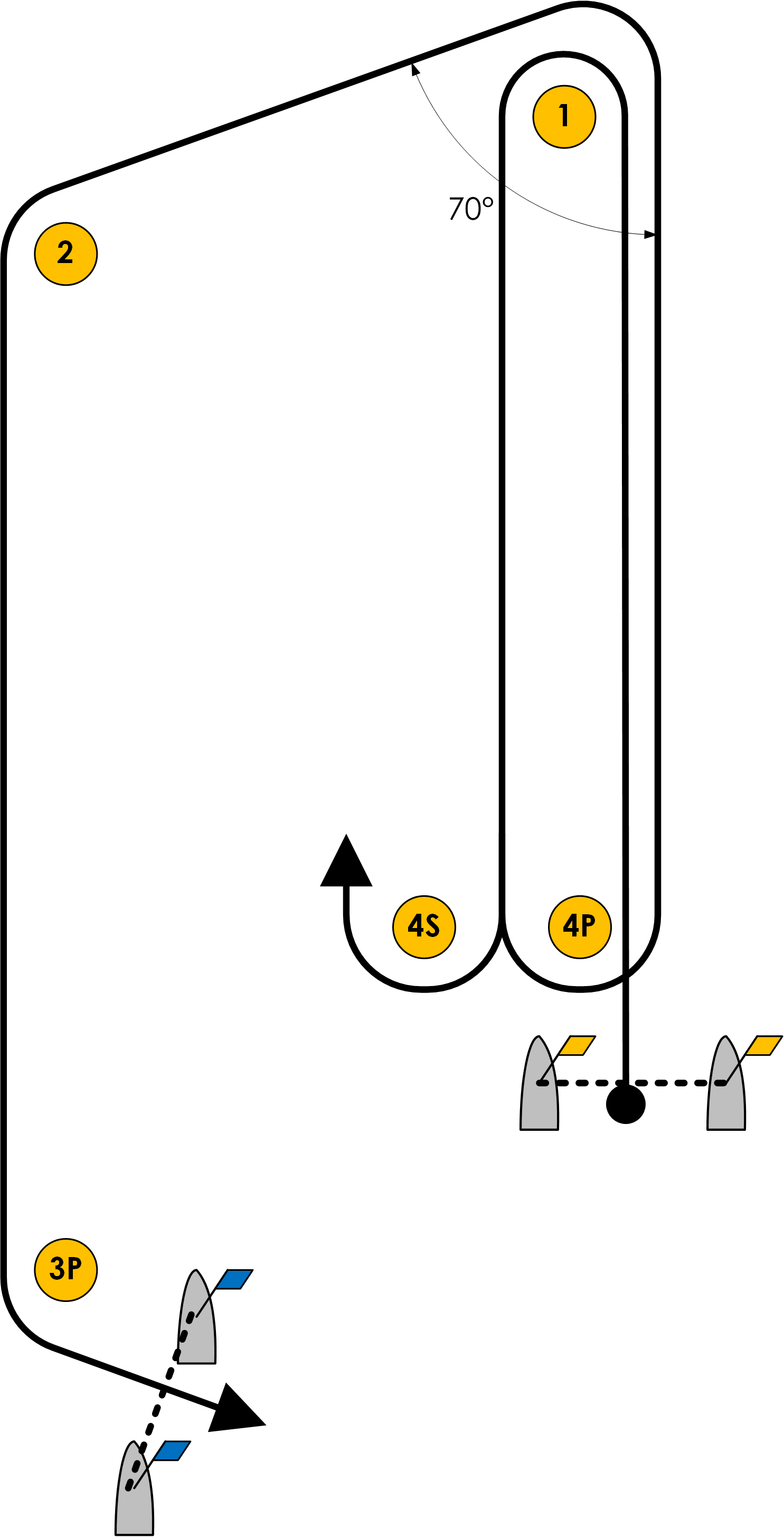
70° Trapezoid Inner Course (I)

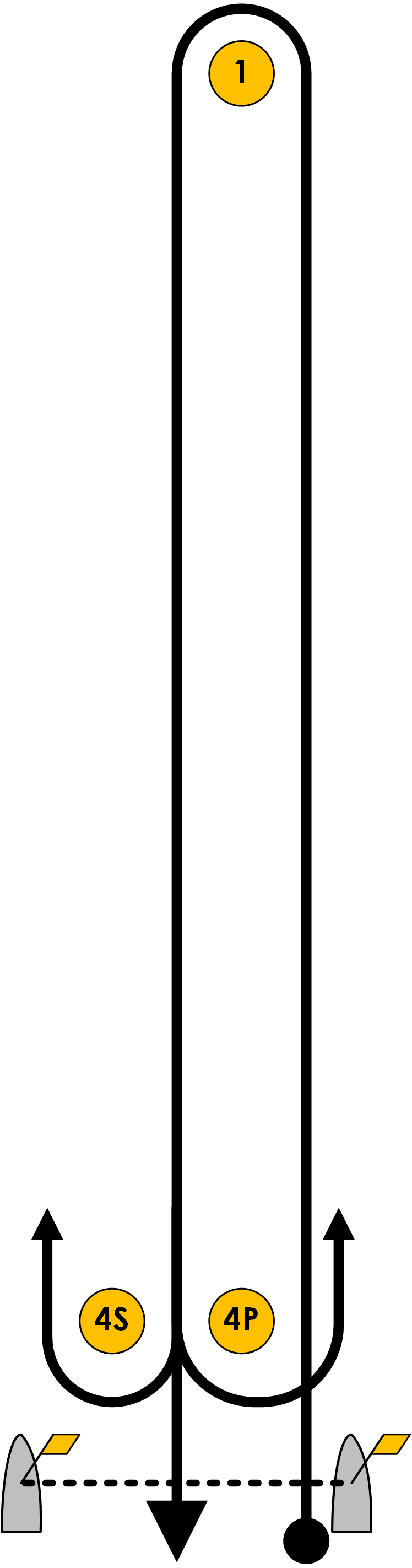
Windward - Leeward Course (W)

=== Outer courses ===
- O1: START – 1 – 2 – 3s/3p – 2 – 3p – FINISH
- O2: START – 1 – 2 – 3s/3p – 2 – 3s/3p – 2 – 3p – FINISH
- O3: START – 1 – 2 – 3s/3p – 2 – 3s/3p – 2 – 3s/3p – 2 – 3p – FINISH

=== Inner courses ===
- I1: START – 1 – 4s/4p – 1 – 2 – 3p – FINISH
- I2: START – 1 – 4s/4p – 1 – 4s/4p – 1 – 2 – 3p – FINISH
- I3: START – 1 – 4s/4p – 1 – 4s/4p – 1 – 4s/4p – 1 – 2 – 3p – FINISH

=== Windward-Leeward courses ===
- W2: START – 1 – 4s/4p – 1 – FINISH
- W3: START – 1 – 4s/4p – 1 – 4s/4p – 1 – FINISH
- W4: START – 1 – 4s/4p – 1 – 4s/4p – 1 – 4s/4p – 1 – FINISH

== Weather conditions ==
In the lead up to the Olympics many questioned the choice of Qingdao as a venue with very little predicted wind. During the races the wind was pretty light and quite unpredictable. Due to lack of wind (< 1.6 knots) one racing day had to be cancelled and the medal race needed to be postponed to the next day.

== Final results ==
Results of individual races
Pos	Helmsman	Country	I	II	III	IV	V	VI	VII	VIII	IX	MR	Tot	Pts
Gold medal	Paul Goodison	Great Britain	15^{†}	2	15	1	9	7	1	4	6	9	78.0	63.0
Silver medal	Vasilij Žbogar	Slovenia	24^{†}	4	14	6	2	11	18	1	11	2	95.0	71.0
Bronze medal	Diego Romero	Italy	6	3	5	36^{†}	10	15	11	9	10	3	111.0	75.0
4	Gustavo Lima	Portugal	5	8	3	27^{†}	17	6	16	8	3	5	103.0	76.0
5	Andrew Murdoch	New Zealand	2	5	40^{†}	20	24	5	5	17	1	1	121.0	81.0
6	Rasmus Myrgren	Sweden	7	16	8	2	8	13	22^{†}	7	2	10	105.0	83.0
7	Julio Alsogaray	Argentina	1	12	10	28^{†}	14	1	2	31	16	4	123.0	92.0
8	Jean-Baptiste Bernaz	France	19	1	12	9	6	10	30	5	34^{†}	6	138.0	104.0
9	Mike Leigh	Canada	13	23	26	5	4	3	28^{†}	2	19	7	137.0	109.0
10	Kristian Ruth	Norway	10	11	17	10	3	8	13	21	38^{†}	8	147.0	109.0
11	Igor Lisovenko	Russia	11	14	4	8	7	26	37^{†}	19	7		133.0	96.0
12	Luka Radelić	Croatia	26^{†}	15	7	21	1	21	3	16	17		127.0	101.0
13	Pavlos Kontides	Cyprus	8	7	24	14	5	12	14	29	35^{†}		148.0	113.0
14	Javier Hernández	Spain	17	25	11	3	28	BFD 44^{†}	19	13	5		165.0	121.0
15	Evangelos Cheimonas	Greece	22	21	9	11	DSQ 44^{†}	BFD 44	9	6	8		174.0	130.0
16	Maciej Grabowski	Poland	9	19	22	18	16	23	32^{†}	20	4		163.0	131.0
17	Alejandro Foglia	Uruguay	12	27	33	7	36^{†}	4	6	26	18		169.0	133.0
18	Kemal Muslubaş	Turkey	4	42^{†}	27	19	15	27	7	15	32		188.0	146.0
19	Andreas Geritzer	Austria	28	6	2	30	20	BFD 44^{†}	DNC 44	18	9		201.0	157.0
20	Shen Sheng	China	40^{†}	35	6	4	37	14	10	28	25		199.0	159.0
21	Thomas Barrows	Virgin Islands	20	28	20	24	26	31^{†}	15	10	21		195.0	164.0
22	Tom Slingsby	Australia	21	22	21	22	35	20	12	11	40^{†}		204.0	164.0
23	Anders Nyholm	Denmark	18	26	19	15	19	BFD 44^{†}	27	27	13		208.0	164.0
24	Deniss Karpak	Estonia	16	20	41^{†}	37	38	2	4	35	14		207.0	166.0
25	Andrew Campbell	United States	14	18	1	26	32	BFD 44^{†}	8	DSQ 44	31		218.0	174.0
26	Matías del Solar	Chile	3	34^{†}	30	25	21	9	25	23	DNE 44		214.0	180.0
27	Bruno Fontes	Brazil	31	17	31	12	12	24	35	22	39^{†}		223.0	184.0
28	Ha Jee-min	South Korea	23	33	37^{†}	31	13	17	17	34	22		227.0	190.0
29	Zsombor Berecz	Hungary	27	31	36	23	18	22	24	14	37^{†}		232.0	195.0
30	Pierre Collura	Finland	25	10	18	41^{†}	23	25	20	33	DNE 44		239.0	198.0
31	Martin Trčka	Czech Republic	29	36	38	13	29	19	26	DNF 44^{†}	12		246.0	202.0
32	Allan Julie	Seychelles	33	37^{†}	13	33	27	16	21	30	30		240.0	203.0
33	Juan Ignacio Maegli	Guatemala	DSQ 44^{†}	9	39	16	BFD 44	32	39	12	5		250.0	206.0
34	Rutger van Schaardenburg	Netherlands	32	29	34	32	25	18	38^{†}	25	20		253.0	215.0
35	Yoichi Iijima	Japan	36	32	16	17	31	BFD 44^{†}	31	DNF 44	28		279.0	235.0
36	Koh Seng Leong	Singapore	35	41	29	39	BFD 44^{†}	33	23	3	36		283.0	239.0
37	Christoph Bottoni	Switzerland	34	13	32	40	39	BFD 44^{†}	36	24	23		285.0	241.0
38	Kevin Lim	Malaysia	BFD 44^{†}	24	28	42	22	34	34	39	26		293.0	249.0
39	José Ruíz	Venezuela	39	40^{†}	23	29	40	29	33	32	24		289.0	249.0
40	Raúl Aguayo	Dominican Republic	37	30	35	38^{†}	34	28	29	36	29		296.0	258.0
41	Marc Schmit	Luxembourg	30	39	25	35	30	35	41^{†}	40	33		308.0	267.0
42	Adil Mohammad	United Arab Emirates	38	38	42	43^{†}	11	36	42	38	27		315.0	272.0
43	Greg Douglas	Barbados	41	43^{†}	43	34	33	30	40	37	41		342.0	299.0

Scoring system: low-point system;
Legend: – Qualified for medal race(s); BFD – Black flag disqualification; DNE – Non excludable disqualification; DNF – Did not finish; DPI – Discretionary penalty imposed; OCS – On the course side of the starting line; † – Discarded race not counted in the overall result;

== Daily standings ==
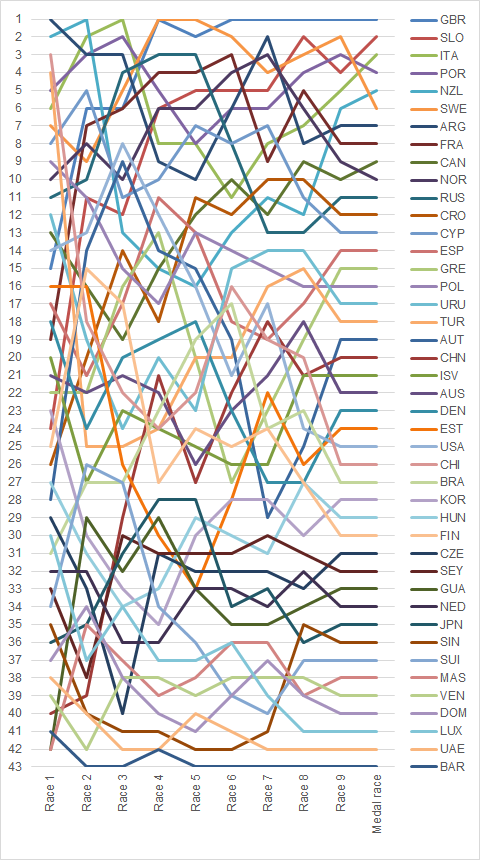
Graph showing the daily standings in the Laser during the 2008 Summer Olympics
