= Stanley Tan =

Singaporean sailor

Personal information
- Full name: Tan Kheng Siong
- Born: 4 November 1974 (age 52) Singapore
- Height: 1.73 m (5 ft 8 in)
- Weight: 82 kg (181 lb)

Sailing career
- Sport: Sailing
- Club: Singapore Armed Forces
- Class: Dinghy

Stanley Tan Kheng Siong (Tan Kheng Siong, born 4 November 1974 in Singapore) is a retired Singaporean sailor, who specialized in the Laser class, and was Singapore's third double-Olympic sailor. He represented his nation Singapore in two editions of the Olympic Games (2000 and 2004).

== Education ==
Tan studied at Raffles Junior College and National University of Singapore.

== Sailing career ==
During his junior college years, Tan started Laser Sailing and participated in the Inter School Championship and various races in Singapore.

In 1993, Tan participated in the Laser Asian Pacific Championship in Auckland, New Zealand.

Tan sailed for Singapore in the OK class at the 1995 Southeast Asian Games and won the silver medal. At the 1997 Southeast Asian Games, he won the silver medal again in the same class.

In 1999, Tan won the bronze medal in the Asia Sailing Championship.

Before qualifying for his first Olympics in 2000, he had already won three Southeast Asian Games silver medals.

Tan made his official debut at the 2000 Summer Olympics in Sydney, where he placed close to last (thirty-eighth) in the Laser class with a net grade of 275, finishing closer behind Malta's Mario Aquilina by a three-point deficit.

At the 2004 Summer Olympics in Athens, Tan qualified in the Laser class by placing again, close to last, at seventy-seventh and obtaining a berth from the World Championships in Bodrum, Turkey. Tan posted a net grade of 322 points and improved his position to thirty-seventh in a fleet of forty-two sailors.
