= Sailing at the 2006 Asian Games – Men's Laser =

Men's Laser at the 2006 Asian Games
- Venue: Doha Sailing Club
- Date: 5–12 December 2006
- Competitors: 11 from 11 nations

Medalists
gold medal	Maximilian Soh	Singapore
silver medal	Yoichi Iijima	Japan
bronze medal	Kim Ho-kon	South Korea

The men's Laser competition at the 2006 Asian Games in Doha was held from 5 to 12 December 2006.

== Schedule ==
All times are Arabia Standard Time (UTC+03:00)

Date	Time	Event
Tuesday, 5 December 2006	11:00	Race 1
Tuesday, 5 December 2006	11:00	Race 2
Wednesday, 6 December 2006	11:00	Race 3
Thursday, 7 December 2006	11:00	Race 4
Thursday, 7 December 2006	11:00	Race 5
Thursday, 7 December 2006	11:00	Race 6
Friday, 8 December 2006	11:00	Race 7
Friday, 8 December 2006	11:00	Race 8
Friday, 8 December 2006	11:00	Race 9
Sunday, 10 December 2006	11:00	Race 10
Monday, 11 December 2006	11:00	Race 11
Tuesday, 12 December 2006	11:00	Race 12

== Results ==
Legend

- DNC — Did not come to the starting area
- DNF — Did not finish
- DSQ — Disqualification
- OCS — On course side

Rank	Athlete	Race												Total
Rank	Athlete	1	2	3	4	5	6	7	8	9	10	11	12	Total
1st place, gold medalist(s)	Maximilian Soh (SIN)	~~(12)~~; OCS	1	3	2	1	5	1	1	3	2	1	2	22
2nd place, silver medalist(s)	Yoichi Iijima (JPN)	1	2	~~(12)~~; DSQ	1	2	3	2	3	6	4	4	3	31
3rd place, bronze medalist(s)	Kim Ho-kon (KOR)	4	3	2	~~(7)~~	5	1	3	4	2	3	3	5	35
4	Kevin Lim (MAS)	~~(12)~~; OCS	12; DNF	1	3	4	4	7	5	1	1	2	1	41
5	Amit Arvind (IND)	3	7	5	4	8	~~(10)~~	5	8	4	7	6	7	64
6	Shen Sheng (CHN)	~~(12)~~; OCS	4	12; DSQ	5	3	2	12; OCS	2	7	5	12; OCS	6	70
7	Sami Kooheji (BRN)	~~(12)~~; OCS	5	4	6	6	6	12; OCS	9	9	6	8	4	75
8	Alexey Sessorov (KAZ)	5	6	9	~~(10)~~	10	7	6	7	5	8	5	9	77
9	Muhammad Yousaf (PAK)	~~(12)~~; OCS	8	6	8	7	8	4	6	8	9	7	8	79
10	Abdulla Al-Tamimi (QAT)	2	9	7	9	9	9	8	10	11	11	10	~~(12)~~; DNC	95
11	Rashid Al-Yahyaei (OMA)	6	10	8	~~(11)~~	11	11	9	11	10	10	9	10	105
