= Sailing at the 2004 Summer Olympics – Laser =

Mixed Laser at the Games of the XXVIII Olympiad
- Line drawing of the Laser
- Venue: Agios Kosmas Olympic Sailing Centre
- Dates: First race: 15 August 2004; Last race: 22 August 2004
- Competitors: 42 from 42 nations

Medalists
1st place, gold medalist(s)		Robert Scheidt	Brazil
2nd place, silver medalist(s)		Andreas Geritzer	Austria
3rd place, bronze medalist(s)		Vasilij Žbogar	Slovenia

The Mixed Laser was a sailing event on the Sailing at the 2004 Summer Olympics program in Agios Kosmas Olympic Sailing Centre. Eleven races were scheduled and completed with one discard. 42 sailors, on 42 boats, from 42 nation competed.

== Race schedule ==
Practice Race	Series Race	Res = Reserve Day

Date	August																	
Date	12 Thu	13 Fri	14 Sat	15 Sun	16 Mon	17 Tue	18 Wed	19 Thu	20 Fri	21 Sat	22 Sun	23 Mon	24 Tue	25 Wed	26 Thu	27 Fri	28 Sat	29 Sun
Actual	PR	PR		S1,2		S3,4	S5,6	S7,8	S9,10	Res	S11							
Scheduled			PR	S1,2	S3,4	S5,6	Res	S7,8	S9,10	Res	S11							

== Final results ==
Rank	Country	Helmsman	Race 1		Race 2		Race 3		Race 4		Race 5		Race 6		Race 7		Race 8		Race 9		Race 10		Race 11		Total	Total – discard
Rank	Country	Helmsman	Pos.	Pts.	Pos.	Pts.	Pos.	Pts.	Pos.	Pts.	Pos.	Pts.	Pos.	Pts.	Pos.	Pts.	Pos.	Pts.	Pos.	Pts.	Pos.	Pts.	Pos.	Pts.	Total	Total – discard
1st place, gold medalist(s)	Brazil	Robert Scheidt	3	3.0	8	8.0	1	1.0	3	3.0	8	8.0	4	4.0	~~19~~	~~19.0~~	12	12.0	7	7.0	3	3.0	6	6.0	74.0	55.0
2nd place, silver medalist(s)	Austria	Andreas Geritzer	4	4.0	1	1.0	~~34~~	~~34.0~~	7	7.0	1	1.0	2	2.0	12	12.0	15	15.0	12	12.0	4	4.0	10	10.0	102.0	68.0
3rd place, bronze medalist(s)	Slovenia	Vasilij Žbogar	~~21~~	~~21.0~~	13	13.0	3	3.0	8	8.0	4	4.0	1	1.0	14	14.0	1	1.0	14	14.0	5	5.0	13	13.0	97.0	76.0
4	Great Britain	Paul Goodison	13	13.0	3	3.0	~~28~~	~~28.0~~	5	5.0	11	11.0	7	7.0	1	1.0	9	9.0	8	8.0	7	7.0	17	17.0	109.0	81.0
5	Portugal	Gustavo Lima	1	1.0	15	15.0	7	7.0	~~28~~	~~28.0~~	14	14.0	19	19.0	6	6.0	4	4.0	2	2.0	1	1.0	19	19.0	116.0	88.0
6	Sweden	Karl Suneson	5	5.0	10	10.0	9	9.0	~~25~~	~~25.0~~	2	2.0	9	9.0	4	4.0	8	8.0	17	17.0	15	15.0	25	25.0	129.0	104.0
7	New Zealand	Hamish Pepper	24	24.0	9	9.0	~~26~~	~~26.0~~	11	11.0	9	9.0	5	5.0	13	13.0	3	3.0	RDG	11.3	2	2.0	21	21.0	134.0	108.3
8	United States	Mark Mendelblatt	2	2.0	14	14.0	20	20.0	6	6.0	6	6.0	10	10.0	~~29~~	~~29.0~~	22	22.0	16	16.0	6	6.0	9	9.0	140.0	111.0
9	Australia	Michael Blackburn	18	18.0	2	2.0	10	10.0	19	19.0	5	5.0	6	6.0	2	2.0	20	20.0	13	13.0	17	17.0	~~32~~	~~32.0~~	144.0	112.0
10	Spain	Luis Martínez	19	19.0	7	7.0	13	13.0	4	4.0	19	19.0	18	18.0	5	5.0	7	7.0	4	4.0	24	24.0	~~36~~	~~36.0~~	156.0	120.0
11	Poland	Maciej Grabowski	8	8.0	23	23.0	~~30~~	~~30.0~~	20	20.0	3	3.0	3	3.0	8	8.0	16	16.0	10	10.0	20	20.0	14	14.0	155.0	125.0
12	Argentina	Diego Emilio Romero	40	40.0	6	6.0	11	11.0	2	2.0	18	18.0	~~OCS~~	~~43.0~~	23	23.0	5	5.0	5	5.0	12	12.0	12	12.0	177.0	134.0
13	Italy	Diego Negri	20	20.0	12	12.0	19	19.0	1	1.0	~~OCS~~	~~43.0~~	21	21.0	15	15.0	13	13.0	15	15.0	21	21.0	2	2.0	182.0	139.0
14	Croatia	Mate Arapov	6	6.0	11	11.0	2	2.0	22	22.0	~~OCS~~	~~43.0~~	13	13.0	3	3.0	25	25.0	29	29.0	25	25.0	3	3.0	182.0	139.0
15	France	Félix Pruvot	10	10.0	~~DSQ~~	~~43.0~~	32	32.0	10	10.0	17	17.0	8	8.0	32	32.0	23	23.0	1	1.0	9	9.0	1	1.0	186.0	143.0
16	Greece	Evangelos Cheimonas	12	12.0	24	24.0	36	36.0	15	15.0	7	7.0	17	17.0	20	20.0	2	2.0	6	6.0	16	16.0	~~37~~	~~37.0~~	192.0	155.0
17	South Africa	Gareth Blanckenberg	22	22.0	16	16.0	~~31~~	~~31.0~~	13	13.0	25	25.0	11	11.0	10	10.0	6	6.0	19	19.0	8	8.0	26	26.0	187.0	156.0
18	Belgium	Philippe Bergmans	9	9.0	4	4.0	5	5.0	14	14.0	~~32~~	~~32.0~~	14	14.0	17	17.0	27	27.0	20	20.0	18	18.0	31	31.0	191.0	159.0
19	Finland	Roope Suomalainen	~~35~~	~~35.0~~	5	5.0	24	24.0	12	12.0	10	10.0	12	12.0	33	33.0	32	32.0	11	11.0	13	13.0	8	8.0	195.0	160.0
20	Seychelles	Allan Julie	14	14.0	17	17.0	8	8.0	~~34~~	~~34.0~~	33	33.0	20	20.0	9	9.0	24	24.0	23	23.0	14	14.0	4	4.0	200.0	166.0
21	Norway	Peer Moberg	7	7.0	18	18.0	37	37.0	23	23.0	12	12.0	26	26.0	34	34.0	14	14.0	3	3.0	~~DSQ~~	~~43.0~~	24	24.0	241.0	198.0
22	Denmark	Anders Nyholm	16	16.0	~~30~~	~~30.0~~	12	12.0	18	18.0	20	20.0	27	27.0	25	25.0	18	18.0	21	21.0	26	26.0	20	20.0	233.0	203.0
23	Chile	Matías del Solar	16	16.0	~~30~~	~~30.0~~	12	12.0	18	18.0	20	20.0	27	27.0	25	25.0	18	18.0	21	21.0	26	26.0	20	20.0	233.0	203.0
24	Malaysia	Kevin Lim	23	23.0	21	21.0	33	33.0	17	17.0	~~OCS~~	~~43.0~~	35	35.0	26	26.0	21	21.0	18	18.0	19	19.0	7	7.0	263.0	220.0
25	Czech Republic	Martin Trčka	37	37.0	29	29.0	15	15.0	27	27.0	15	15.0	32	32.0	28	28.0	31	31.0	~~33~~	~~33.0~~	10	10.0	11	11.0	268.0	231.0
26	Russia	Maksim Semerkhanov	34	34.0	33	33.0	29	29.0	16	16.0	13	13.0	30	30.0	22	22.0	~~37~~	~~37.0~~	31	31.0	22	22.0	5	5.0	272.0	235.0
27	Lithuania	Giedrius Gužys	31	31.0	19	19.0	21	21.0	24	24.0	21	21.0	~~34~~	~~34.0~~	24	24.0	19	19.0	25	25.0	27	27.0	28	28.0	273.0	239.0
28	Cyprus	Haris Papadopoulos	25	25.0	~~DNS~~	~~43.0~~	27	27.0	9	9.0	OCS	43.0	16	16.0	7	7.0	10	10.0	30	30.0	38	38.0	39	39.0	287.0	244.0
29	Canada	Bernard Luttmer	15	15.0	25	25.0	22	22.0	21	21.0	27	27.0	33	33.0	31	31.0	~~DNF~~	~~43.0~~	9	9.0	32	32.0	30	30.0	288.0	245.0
30	Ireland	Rory Fitzpatrick	~~33~~	~~33.0~~	26	26.0	38	38.0	31	31.0	26	26.0	22	22.0	27	27.0	26	26.0	24	24.0	11	11.0	22	22.0	281.0	248.0
31	China	Chi Qiang	29	29.0	28	28.0	4	4.0	~~37~~	~~37.0~~	22	22.0	29	29.0	36	36.0	17	17.0	28	28.0	23	23.0	35	35.0	288.0	251.0
32	South Korea	Kim Ho-kon	17	17.0	34	34.0	14	14.0	35	35.0	30	30.0	24	24.0	11	11.0	30	30.0	~~37~~	~~37.0~~	37	37.0	23	23.0	292.0	255.0
33	Turkey	Kemal Muslubaş	11	11.0	20	20.0	18	18.0	~~OCS~~	~~43.0~~	28	28.0	31	31.0	16	16.0	35	35.0	26	26.0	28	28.0	DNF	43.0	299.0	256.0
34	Uruguay	Alejandro Foglia	26	26.0	31	31.0	17	17.0	33	33.0	23	23.0	23	23.0	~~35~~	~~35.0~~	29	29.0	32	32.0	34	34.0	29	29.0	312.0	277.0
35	Japan	Kunio Suzuki	30	30.0	22	22.0	39	39.0	~~OCS~~	~~43.0~~	29	29.0	25	25.0	30	30.0	28	28.0	22	22.0	29	29.0	27	27.0	314.0	281.0
36	Ukraine	Yuriy Orlov	36	36.0	32	32.0	23	23.0	29	29.0	24	24.0	36	36.0	~~40~~	~~40.0~~	36	36.0	35	35.0	30	30.0	33	33.0	354.0	314.0
37	Singapore	Stanley Tan Kheng Siong	32	32.0	27	27.0	25	25.0	30	30.0	34	34.0	40	40.0	41	41.0	39	39.0	36	36.0	~~DSQ~~	~~43.0~~	18	18.0	365.0	322.0
38	Peru	Augusto Nicolini	38	38.0	35	35.0	16	16.0	39	39.0	31	31.0	28	28.0	38	38.0	33	33.0	~~DSQ~~	~~43.0~~	33	33.0	38	38.0	372.0	329.0
39	Malta	Mario Aquilina	27	27.0	37	37.0	40	40.0	26	26.0	~~OCS~~	~~43.0~~	37	37.0	21	21.0	40	40.0	38	38.0	39	39.0	34	34.0	382.0	339.0
40	Iceland	Hafsteinn Geirsson	28	28 .0	36	36.0	42	42.0	36	36.0	35	35.0	~~DNF~~	~~43.0~~	39	39.0	38	38.0	40	40.0	35	35.0	15	15.0	387.0	344.0
41	Virgin Islands	Timothy Pitts	~~42~~	~~42.0~~	40	40.0	41	41.0	40	40.0	36	36.0	39	39.0	37	37.0	34	34.0	34	34.0	40	40.0	40	40.0	423.0	381.0
42	Bahrain	Sami Kooheji	41	41.0	39	39.0	35	35.0	32	32.0	~~OCS~~	~~43.0~~	38	38.0	42	42.0	41	41.0	39	39.0	36	36.0	41	41.0	427.0	384.0

Legend: DNF – Did not finish; DSQ – Disqualified; OCS – On the course side of the starting line; RDG – Redress given;
Discard is crossed out and does not count for the overall result.
Gender: – male; – female;

== Daily standings ==
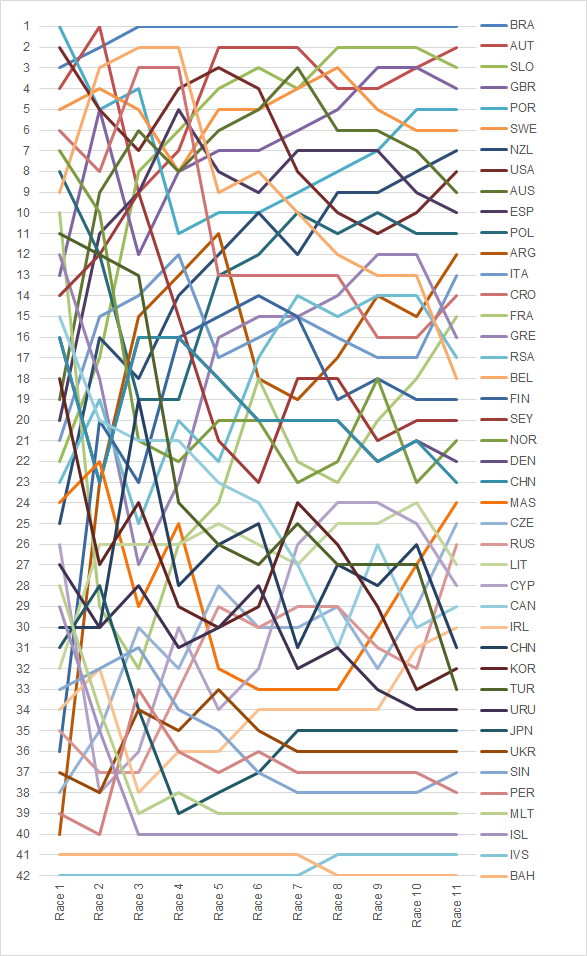
Graph showing the daily standings in the Laser at the 2004 Summer Olympics
