= John Myrdal =

John Myrdal may refer to:

- John Myrdal (bowls) (1911–unknown), South African international lawn bowler
- John Myrdal (sailor) (born 1971), American competitive sailor
