= Pierre Collura =

Finnish sailor

Personal information
- Full name: Pierre Angelo Collura
- Nationality: Finland
- Born: 19 July 1989 (age 37) Antananarivo, Madagascar
- Height: 1.80 m (5 ft 11 in)
- Weight: 80 kg (176 lb)

Sailing career
- Sport: Sailing
- Club: Lahden Purjehdusseura
- Coached by: Alp Alpagut (TUR)
- Class: Dinghy

Pierre Angelo Collura (né Rakutuarisua; born 19 July 1989) is a Finnish former sailor, who specialized in the Laser class. He was born in Madagascar, and when he was four months old, a Finnish woman and an Italian man adopted him. Collura finished among the top fifteen sailors in the Laser Radial class at the 2005 ISAF Youth World Championships in Fortaleza, Brazil and represented his maternal homeland Finland in the senior Laser class at the 2008 Summer Olympics. Collura trained under the tutelage of his personal coach Alp Alpagut, while sailing separately for two different clubs at his parents' homebases, namely Lahden Purjehdusseura in Lahti and Circolo Vela Torbole in Torbole, Italy.

Collura competed for the Finnish sailing team, as a 19-year-old, in the Laser class at the 2008 Summer Olympics in Beijing. Building up to his maiden Games, he stood thirtieth, well ahead of two-time Olympian Roope Suomalainen, to lock the country's Laser spot at the Semaine Olympique Française three months earlier in Hyères, France. Collura got off to a comfortable start with a top-ten finish on the second leg, but a double yellow-flag penalty saw him tumble down the scoreboard to thirtieth overall after ten races, accumulating a net score of 198.

Collura has dual citizenship in Finland and Italy.
