= 1998 ISAF Youth Sailing World Championships – Laser Radial =

Laser Radial at the 1998 ISAF Youth Sailing World Championships
- Venue: Simon's Town, South Africa
- Dates: 28 December 1998 - 5 January 1999

Medalists
gold medal	Katarzyna Deberny	Poland
silver medal	Sarah Ayton	Great Britain
bronze medal	Jo Dikkenberg	Australia

The Laser Radial competition at the 1998 ISAF Youth Sailing World Championships took place from 28 December 1998 to 5 January 1999. 22 sailors competed, with Katarzyna Deberny of Poland winning the event.

== Results ==
Pos	Helm	Country	R1	R2	R3	R4	R5	R6	R7	R8	R9	R10	R11	Total	Nett
1	Katarzyna Deberny	Poland	1	1	(6)	(4)	1	2	2	1	4	1	1	24	14
2	Sarah Ayton	United Kingdom	2	2	4	2	3	1	(18)	(12)	1	2	2	49	19
3	Jo Dikkenberg	Australia	5	3	3	(9)	2	(6)	5	3	5	3	4	48	33
4	Sophie de Turckheim	France	4	4	(13)	5	4	(9)	6	4	3	4	5	61	39
5	Amanda Clark	United States	(10)	7	2	(12)	5	7	8	8	8	5	3	75	53
6	Signe Livbjerg	Denmark	(23)	6	5	1	8	5	(11)	6	11	8	6	90	56
7	Georgia Chimona	Greece	3	(15)	8	10	7	3	7	2	10	6	(11)	82	56
8	Kristina Tuhus	Norway	7	8	7	(16)	10	13	4	5	2	(14)	9	95	65
9	Michelle Vinsen	New Zealand	(14)	5	9	3	6	(11)	10	9	9	7	7	90	65
10	Tina Martin	Germany	6	11	(14)	7	(12)	10	3	10	7	11	12	103	77
11	Irina Anistratenko	Ukraine	13	12	(23 DSQ)	(18)	11	4	1	11	16	9	8	126	85
12	Yumiko Katsuma	Japan	11	(17)	1	11	14	12	9	(16)	6	15	15	127	94
13	Caroline Béjar	Brazil	8	10	(16)	13	9	14	(15)	7	12	10	13	127	96
14	Megan Griffiths	United Kingdom	9	14	(18)	6	(18)	16	17	13	14	12	14	151	115
15	Maria Malmros	Sweden	16	9	12	15	13	8	19	14	(20)	(20)	10	156	116
16	Catarina Lopes	Portugal	(19)	18	10	8	17	15	12	18	18	17	(20)	172	133
17	Penny Alison	South Africa	17	16	11	14	15	(20)	16	(23 OCS)	15	16	17	180	137
18	Ashley Baker	Canada	12	(19)	15	(20)	16	17	14	15	13	18	18	177	138
19	Antoinette Dobbelmann	Netherlands	15	13	17	17	(19)	(19)	13	17	17	13	16	176	138
20	Hui Chin Goh	Singapore	18	(21)	19	19	(20)	18	20	19	19	19	19	211	170
21	Kate Allport	Kenya	20	20	20	(21)	21	21	21	20	21	(22)	21	228	185
22	Kili Chivers	Guam	(23 DNF)	(23 DNF)	21	22	22	22	22	21	22	21	22	241	195
