= Crofoot =

Crofoot is a surname. Notable people with the surname include:

- Alan Crofoot (1929–1979), Canadian opera tenor and actor
- John Crofoot (1927–1988), American politician
- Leonard Crofoot (born 1948), American actor
- Margaret Crofoot (born 1980), American anthropologist
- Tiko Crofoot (born 1979), Fijian sailor

== Other uses ==
Crofoot may also refer to:

- The Crofoot, a Detroit entertainment complex
