= World Military Sailing Championship =

Annual sailing competition for members of the military

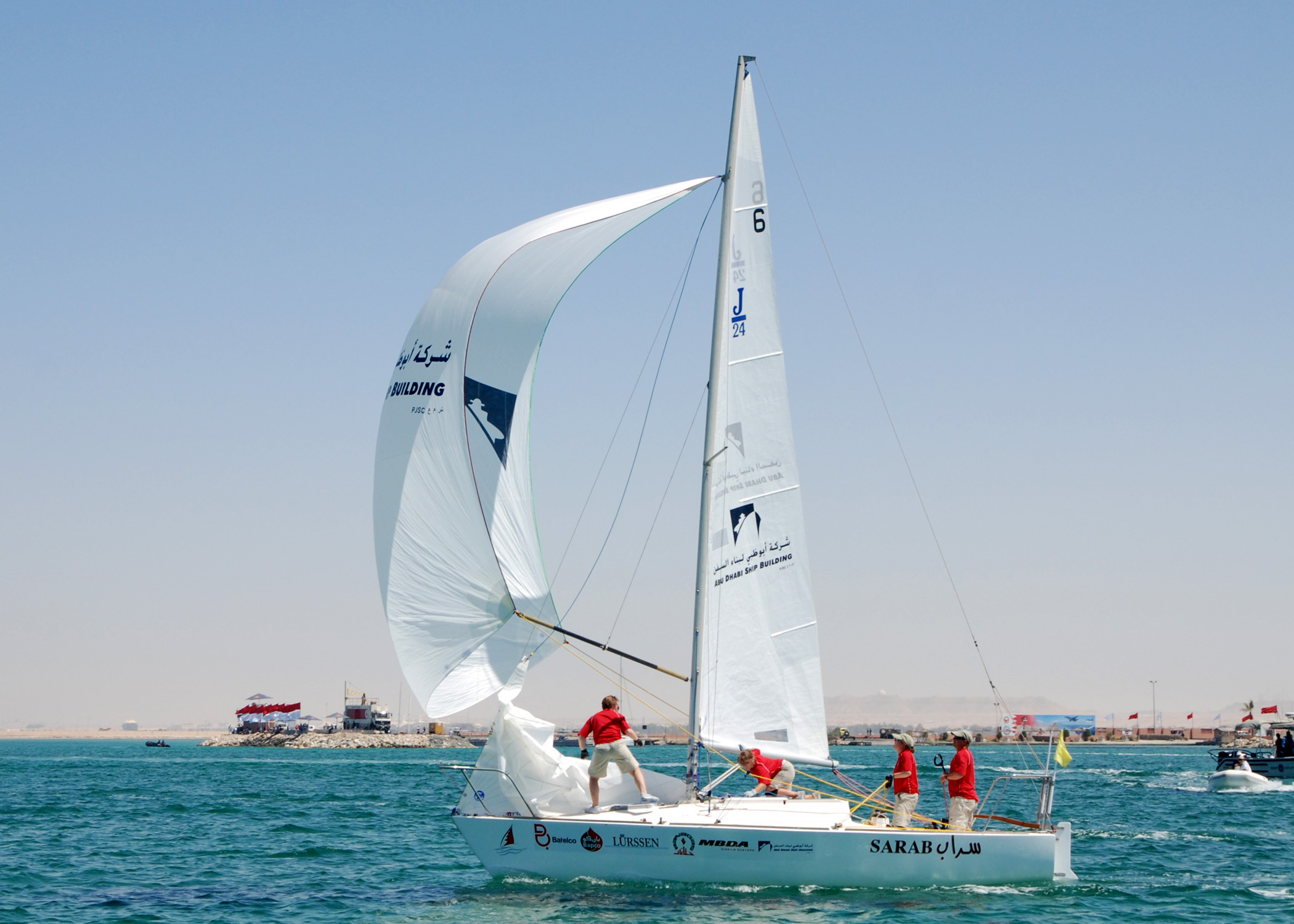
U.S.A. team at the 44th World Military Sailing Championship, in 2010.

The World Military Sailing Championship are the World Military Championships in sailing, organized by the International Military Sports Council (CISM) since 1949.

== History ==
The first World Military Sailing Championships was held in Brest, France in 1949, in the Star class. In 1954 the International Military Sports Council (CSIM) combined two sports disciplines, naval pentathlon and sailing, forming what they called "Sea Week". From 1954 through to 2000 Sea Week took place almost every year. In 1998 the CISM Board of Directors reverted their decision to host the two previous sporting disciplines and the last Sea Week Championship was hosted by Sweden in 2000.

In the year of the Military World Games (from 1995, every four years), championship are the same of the World Games tournament, except at the 2nd Military World Games in Croatia (1999), when sailing was not included as a sport because Denmark hosted a World Military Sailing Championship instead.

== Editions and champions ==
Ed.	Year	Site	Gold	Silver	Bronze	Boats
1	1949	Brest	Denmark	Netherlands	United Kingdom	Star
2	1951	Copenhagen	Denmark	France	United Kingdom	Dragon
3	1954	Livourne	Belgium	France	Italy	Lightning
4	1955	Stockholm	Italy	Norway	Sweden	Star
5	1956	Athens	Egypt	Greece	Italy	
6	1957	Horten	Greece	Netherlands	Norway	
7	1958	Karlskrona	Netherlands	Italy	Norway	
8	1959	Den Helder	Netherlands	Sweden	Norway	
9	1961	Taranto	Italy	France	Greece	Finn
10	1962	Athens	Greece	Netherlands	United States	Finn
11	1963	Karlskrona	United States	Belgium	Italy	Finn
12	1966	Karlskrona	Sweden	Denmark	Italy	OK
13	1967	Athens	France	Greece	Brazil	Finn
14	1968	Den Helder	Sweden	United States	Brazil	Dragon
15	1969	Rio de Janeiro	Germany	Denmark	Sweden	Snipe
16	1975	Berga	Sweden	Germany	Denmark	Monark 606
17	1978	Den Helder	Denmark	France	Argentina	470
18	1979	San Diego	Denmark	Germany	Sweden	470
19	1980	Karlskrona	United States	Sweden	Denmark	Monark 606
20	1981	Mar del Plata	United States	Italy	Sweden	
21	1983	Eckernförde	United States	Germany	Sweden	Pirate
22	1984	Horten	United States	Italy	Denmark	Yngling
23	1985	San Diego	Norway	Germany	Denmark	
24	1986	Rio de Janeiro	Brazil	Denmark	Norway	
25	1987	Karlskrona	United States	Germany	Norway	Monark 606
26	1988	Den Helder	Norway	United States	Netherlands	Centaur
27	1989	Port Belgrano	United States	Norway	Italy	
28	1991	Karachi	United States	Pakistan	Denmark	Enterprise
29	1992	Coronado	United States	Greece	Norway	420
30	1994	Stavanger	Denmark	Finland	Belarus	Yngling
31	1995	Rome	Italy; Ukraine	Russia	Germany	470
32	1996	Eckernförde	France	Argentina	Canada	Topper
33	1997	Karachi	Russia	France	Denmark	Laser
34	1999	Auderød	Russia	Belarus	Finland	Yngling
35	2000	Berga	Ukraine	Italy	Belarus	Monark 606
36	2001	Victoria	Finland	Italy	United States	Martin 242
37	2003	Catania	Italy	France	Russia	Giro 34
38	2004	Marín	Russia	France	United States	Snipe
39	2005	Brest	United States	Germany	France	J/80
40	2006	Mumbai	India	Russia	Sri Lanka	Enterprise
41	2007	Mumbai	India	France	Spain	Enterprise
42	2008	Sønderborg	Russia	Finland	Ukraine	Yngling
43	2009	Węgorzewo	Ukraine	Turkey	France	Omega
44	2010	Manama	Italy	Russia	Turkey	J/24
45	2011 (match racing)	Rio de Janeiro	Brazil	Greece	Brunei	J/24
45	2011 (fleet racing)	Rio de Janeiro	Ukraine	Brazil	Poland	HPE 25
46	2013	Bergen	Brazil	Ukraine	Poland	Yngling
47	2014	Doha	Germany	Ukraine	Poland	470
48	2015	Pohang	Ukraine	Brazil	Russia	2000
49	2016	Karachi	Russia	Pakistan	Norway	J/80
50	2018	Helsinki	Brazil	Russia	Poland	J/80
51	2019	Wuhan	Brazil	Russia	Italy	470
52	2021	Marín	Italy	Russia	Ukraine	Snipe
53	2022	Brest				
