= Blanckenberg =

Blanckenberg is a surname. Notable people with the surname include:

- Gareth Blanckenberg (born 1980), South African sailor
- Jimmy Blanckenberg (1892–1955), South African cricketer
