= Kunio Suzuki =

Japanese sailor (born 1976)

Personal information
- Nationality: Japan
- Born: 9 February 1976 (age 50) Yokkaichi, Mie, Japan
- Height: 1.80 m (5 ft 11 in)
- Weight: 84 kg (185 lb)

Sailing career
- Sport: Sailing
- Club: Wakayama Marina City
- Class: Dinghy
Medal record
Men's sailing
Representing Japan
Asian Games
| Bronze medal – third place | 2002 Busan | Laser |

Kunio Suzuki (鈴木 國央, Suzuki Kunio; born 9 February 1976 in Yokkaichi, Mie) is a Japanese sailor, who specialized in the Laser and two-person keelboat (Star) class. He earned a bronze medal in his respective category at the 2002 Asian Games in Busan, South Korea, and also represented his nation Japan in two editions of the Olympic Games (2000 and 2004). Suzuki also trains full-time for the Wakayama Marina City Regatta in Wakayama.

Suzuki made his official debut at the 2000 Summer Olympics in Sydney, where he placed twenty-seventh in the Laser class with a net grade of 202, surpassing Seychelles' Allan Julie by a single mark.

When South Korea hosted the 2002 Asian Games in Busan, Suzuki sailed vigorously to pick up a bronze medal in the Laser class with a satisfying score of 26, finishing behind the host nation's Kim Ho-kon by an eighteen-point deficit.

At the 2004 Summer Olympics in Athens, Suzuki qualified for his second Japanese team in the Laser class by placing sixty-first and obtaining a berth from the World Championships in Bodrum, Turkey. Sailing through the race series with a similar effort from the previous Olympics, Suzuki dropped his position to thirty-fifth with a net score of 281 in a fleet of forty-two sailors.

Shortly after his second Olympics, Suzuki set a temporary retirement from his own category, but came back to the sailing scene in 2006 to team up with Daichi Wada in the Star class.
