= Christoph Bottoni =

Swiss sailor (born 1977)

Personal information
- Nationality: Switzerland
- Born: 21 October 1987 (age 38) Winterthur, Switzerland
- Height: 1.80 m (5 ft 11 in)
- Weight: 80 kg (176 lb)

Sailing career
- Sport: Sailing
- Club: Circolo Velico Lago di Lugano
- Class: Dinghy

Christoph Bottoni (born 21 September 1977) is a Swiss former sailor, who specialized in the Laser class. Representing his nation Switzerland at the 2008 Summer Olympics, Bottoni trained for several years at Lake Lugano Yachting Club (Italian: Circolo Velico Lago di Lugano). Outside the sailing career, Bottoni worked as an orthodontist for five years at a children dental hospital in Zurich. Additionally, he was elected the second-runner-up in the 2006 edition of the prestigious Mister Switzerland pageant.

Bottoni competed for the Swiss sailing team, as a 31-year-old, in the Laser class at the 2008 Summer Olympics in Beijing. Four months earlier, he prevailed over the quota place winner Max Bulley to lock the country's top Laser spot for the Games based on his overall results in two selection meets, the class-associated Worlds and the annual Princess Sofia Trophy regatta in Palma de Mallorca, Spain. Bottoni sailed smoothly almost at the sterns of the 43-man fleet with only a single top-fifteen mark recorded after ten races, sitting him in the thirty-seventh spot with 241 net points.
