= John van Batenburg Stafford =

Caymanian sailor

Personal information
- Nationality: Caymanian
- Born: 7 December 1967 (age 57)

Sport
- Sport: Sailing

John van Batenburg Stafford (born 7 December 1967) is a Caymanian sailor. He competed in the Laser event at the 1996 Summer Olympics.
