= Giedrius Gužys =

Lithuanian sailor (born 1976)

Personal information
- Nationality: Lithuania
- Born: 4 December 1976 (age 49) Kaunas, Lithuanian SSR, Soviet Union
- Height: 1.89 m (6 ft 2 1/2 in)
- Weight: 84 kg (185 lb)

Sailing career
- Sport: Sailing
- Club: Bangpūtys
- Class: Dinghy

Giedrius Gužys (born 4 December 1976 in Kaunas) is a retired Lithuanian sailor, who specialized in the Laser class. He represented his nation Lithuania in two editions of the Olympic Games (2000 and 2004), and has placed outside the top ten in his respective sailing class at the ISAF World Championships and ISAF World Cup series. Guzys also trained throughout his sporting career for Bangpūtys Sailing Regatta in Kaunas.

Guzys made his official debut at the 2000 Summer Olympics in Sydney, where he placed twenty-fifth in the Laser class with a net score of 177 points, trailing behind Canada's Marty Essig by a single mark.

At the 2004 Summer Olympics in Athens, Guzys qualified for his second Lithuanian team, as a 27-year-old, in the Laser class by receiving a berth from the European Championships in Warnemünde, Germany. Sailing through the race series with a mediocre effort, Guzys posted a remarkable grade of 239 net points to establish a twenty-seventh spot in a fleet of forty-two sailors.
