= Antonio Goeters =

Mexican sailor (born 1973)

Personal information
- Nationality: Mexican
- Born: 16 March 1973 (age 52)

Sport
- Sport: Sailing

Antonio Goeters (born 16 March 1973) is a Mexican sailor. He competed in the Laser event at the 1996 Summer Olympics.
