= Rodney Reader =

Barbadian sailor

Personal information
- Nationality: Barbadian
- Born: 24 June 1961 (age 63)

Sport
- Sport: Sailing

Rodney Reader (born 24 June 1961) is a Barbadian sailor. He competed in the Laser event at the 1996 Summer Olympics.
