= Dimitrios Theodorakis =

Greek sailor

Personal information
- Nationality: Greek
- Born: 11 September 1970 (age 54); Athens, Greece

Sport
- Sport: Sailing

Dimitrios Theodorakis (born 11 September 1970) is a Greek sailor. He competed in the Laser event at the 1996 Summer Olympics.
