= Constantino Scarpetta =

Paraguayan sailor

Personal information
- Nationality: Paraguayan
- Born: 6 April 1977 (age 48)

Sport
- Sport: Sailing

Constantino Scarpetta (born 6 April 1977) is a Paraguayan sailor. He competed in the Laser event at the 1996 Summer Olympics.
