= John Tabone (sailor) =

Maltese sailor

Personal information
- Nationality: Maltese
- Born: 25 July 1958 (age 67)

Sport
- Sport: Sailing

John Tabone (born 25 July 1958) is a Maltese sailor. He competed in the Laser event at the 1996 Summer Olympics.
