= Dave Hibberd =

South African sailor

Personal information
- Nationality: South African
- Born: 16 August 1965 (age 61)

Sport
- Sport: Sailing

Dave Hibberd (born 16 August 1965) is a South African sailor. He competed in the Laser event at the 1996 Summer Olympics.
