= Luka Radelić =

Croatian sailor

Personal information
- Nationality: Croatia
- Born: 8 March 1981 (age 45) Split, SR Croatia, SFR Yugoslavia
- Height: 1.89 m (6 ft 2 in)
- Weight: 81 kg (179 lb)

Sailing career
- Sport: Sailing
- Coached by: Nenad Viali
- Class: Laser

Luka Radelić (born 8 March 1981 in Split) is a Croatian sailor. Radelic represented Croatia at the 2008 Summer Olympics in Beijing, where he competed for the Laser class. He placed twelfth out of forty-three Laser sailors at the end of ten preliminary races in this event, with a score of 101 net points.

Radelic achieved his best results in Laser sailing by winning the championship title at the 2005 International New Year's Regatta – Laser Europa Cup in Hvar. He is also a member of Mornar Sailing Club in his home city Split, and is coached and trained by Nenad Viali.
