= Aleksandr Zelenovsky =

Belarusian sailor

Personal information
- Nationality: Belarusian
- Born: 28 December 1972 (age 52); Minsk, Belarus

Sport
- Sport: Sailing

Aleksandr Zelenovsky (born 28 December 1972) is a Belarusian sailor. He competed in the Laser event at the 1996 Summer Olympics.
