= Roope Suomalainen =

Finnish sailor

Personal information
- Full name: Roope Samuel Suomalainen
- Nationality: Finland
- Born: 6 September 1973 (age 53) Kotka, Finland
- Height: 1.80 m (5 ft 11 in)
- Weight: 81 kg (179 lb)

Sailing career
- Sport: Sailing
- Club: Kotkan Pursiseura
- Class: Dinghy

Roope Samuel Suomalainen (born 6 September 1973 in Kotka) is a retired Finnish sailor, who specialized in the Laser class. He represented his nation Finland in two editions of the Olympic Games (2000 and 2004), and has also been training throughout most of his sporting career for Kotka Yacht Club (Finnish: Kotkan Pursiseura) in his native Kotka.

Suomalainen made his official debut at the 2000 Summer Olympics in Sydney, where he placed seventeenth in the Laser class with a net grade of 127, surpassing Hungary's Tamas Eszes by a single mark in total.

At the 2004 Summer Olympics in Athens, Suomalainen qualified for his second Finnish team, as a 30-year-old, in the Laser class by placing fourteenth and obtaining a berth from the 2003 ISAF World Championships in Cadiz, Spain. Unlike his previous Olympics, Suomalainen could not upgrade his feat with a nineteenth-place effort in a fleet of forty-two sailors, recording a net score of 160.
