= Gastón Vedani =

Ecuadorian sailor

Personal information
- Nationality: Ecuadorian
- Born: 23 March 1977 (age 48)

Sport
- Sport: Sailing

Gastón Vedani (born 23 March 1977) is an Ecuadorian sailor. He competed in the Laser event at the 1996 Summer Olympics.
