= Rory Fitzpatrick (sailor) =

Irish sailor

Personal information
- Nationality: Irish
- Born: 21 June 1980 (age 44); Dublin, Ireland

Sport
- Sport: Sailing

Rory Fitzpatrick (born 21 June 1980) is an Irish sailor. He competed in the Laser event at the 2004 Summer Olympics.
