= Maksim Semerkhanov =

Russian sailor

Personal information
- Nationality: Russian
- Born: 1 August 1975 (age 51) Moskva

Sport
- Sport: Sailing

Maksim Semerkhanov (born 1 August 1975) is a Russian sailor. He competed in the Laser event at the 2004 Summer Olympics. In 2021, he won the silver medal at the World Military Sailing Championship.
