= Aleksandr Mumyga =

Belarusian sailor

Personal information
- Nationality: Belarusian
- Born: 23 July 1982 (age 42); Minsk, Belarus

Sport
- Sport: Sailing

Aleksandr Mumyga (born 23 July 1982) is a Belarusian sailor. He competed in the Laser event at the 2000 Summer Olympics.
