= Sailing at the 2002 Asian Games – Men's Laser =

Men's Laser at the 2002 Asian Games
- Venue: Busan Yachting Center
- Date: 3–9 October 2002
- Competitors: 8 from 8 nations

Medalists
gold medal	Kim Ho-kon	South Korea
silver medal	Kevin Lim	Malaysia
bronze medal	Kunio Suzuki	Japan

The men's Laser competition at the 2002 Asian Games in Busan was held from 3 to 9 October 2002 at the Busan Yachting Center.

== Schedule ==
All times are Korea Standard Time (UTC+09:00)

Date	Time	Event
Thursday, 3 October 2002	11:00	Race 1
Thursday, 3 October 2002	14:00	Race 2
Friday, 4 October 2002	11:00	Race 3
Saturday, 5 October 2002	10:00	Race 4
Saturday, 5 October 2002	11:00	Race 5
Saturday, 5 October 2002	14:00	Race 6
Monday, 7 October 2002	11:00	Race 7
Monday, 7 October 2002	14:00	Race 8
Tuesday, 8 October 2002	11:00	Race 9
Tuesday, 8 October 2002	14:00	Race 10
Wednesday, 9 October 2002	11:00	Race 11

== Results ==
Legend

- DSQ — Disqualification
- RAF — Retired after finishing

Rank	Athlete	Race											Total
Rank	Athlete	1	2	3	4	5	6	7	8	9	10	11	Total
1st place, gold medalist(s)	Kim Ho-kon (KOR)	1	1	1	1	1	1	1	1	~~(3)~~	~~(9)~~; RAF	X	8
2nd place, silver medalist(s)	Kevin Lim (MAS)	~~(3)~~	2	~~(3)~~	3	2	2	2	2	1	1	X	15
3rd place, bronze medalist(s)	Kunio Suzuki (JPN)	2	5	2	~~(6)~~	3	3	5	4	2	~~(7)~~	X	26
4	Lin Changfu (CHN)	4	3	4	~~(5)~~	4	4	3	3	~~(9)~~; DSQ	3	X	28
5	Koh Seng Leong (SIN)	~~(7)~~	6	5	2	~~(7)~~	6	4	6	4	2	X	35
6	Sandeep Srikanth (IND)	5	4	~~(6)~~	4	5	5	~~(6)~~	5	5	4	X	37
7	Muhammad Yousaf (PAK)	6	7	7	~~(8)~~	6	7	7	~~(8)~~	6	5	X	51
8	Salem Al-Fahad (KUW)	~~(8)~~	~~(8)~~	8	7	8	8	8	7	7	6	X	59
