= Luis Echenique =

Chilean sailor

Personal information
- Born: 25 January 1972 (age 54) Santiago, Chile

Sport
- Sport: Sailing
- Club: Yacht Club Santo Amaro São Paulo

Luis Felipe Echenique Wielandt (born 25 January 1972) is a Chilean sailor. He competed in the Laser event at the 1996 Summer Olympics.
