= Aimilios Oikonomidis =

Cypriot sailor (born 1959)

Personal information
- Nationality: Cypriot
- Born: 13 February 1959 (age 66)
- Height: 187 cm (6 ft 2 in)
- Weight: 82 kg (181 lb)

Sport
- Sport: Sailing

Aimilios Oikonomidis (Greek: Αιμίλιος Οικονομίδης, also known as Emilios Economides; born 13 January 1959) is a Cypriot sailor. He competed in the Laser event at the 2000 Summer Olympics.
