= Augusto Nicolini =

Peruvian sailor

Personal information
- Born: 29 September 1972 (age 53) Lima, Peru

Sport
- Sport: Sailing

Augusto Nicolini (born 29 September 1972) is a Peruvian sailor. He competed in the Laser event at the 2004 Summer Olympics.
