= Mohamed Youssef (sailor) =

Djiboutian sailor (born 1964)

Mohamed Youssef (Somali: Maxamed Yuusuf) (born 30 December 1964) is an international sailor who competes for Djibouti.

Youssef competed in the 1996 Summer Olympics held in Atlanta, he entered the Laser class and after 11 races he finished 55th out of the 56 that finished.
