= Rodney Davis =

Rodney Davis may refer to:

- Rodney M. Davis (1942–1967), U.S. Marine and Medal of Honor recipient
  - USS Rodney M. Davis, named in his honor, launched in 1986
- Rodney Davis (politician) (born 1970), U.S Representative for Illinois's 13th congressional district

== See also ==
- Rod Davis (disambiguation)
- Rodney Davies (disambiguation)
