= Jens Eckardt =

Danish sailor (born 1968)

Personal information
- Nationality: Danish
- Born: 11 July 1968 (age 57) Copenhagen, Denmark

Sport
- Sport: Sailing

Jens Eckardt (born 11 July 1968) is a Danish sailor. He competed in the Laser event at the 1996 Summer Olympics.
