= Tim Pitts =

United States Virgin Islands sailor

Personal information
- Full name: Timothy Pitts
- Nationality: American Virgin Islander
- Born: December 11, 1981 (age 44) Christiansted, Saint Croix, U.S. Virgin Islands

Sport
- Sport: Sailing

Timothy Pitts (born December 11, 1981) is a sailor who represented the United States Virgin Islands. He competed in the Laser event at the 2004 Summer Olympics.
