= Yuriy Orlov =

Ukrainian sailor

Personal information
- Nationality: Ukrainian
- Born: 2 June 1977 (age 47); Kyiv, Ukrainian SSR, Soviet Union

Sport
- Sport: Sailing

Yuriy Orlov (born 2 June 1977) is a Ukrainian sailor. He competed in the Laser event at the 2004 Summer Olympics.
