= Horia Ispaș =

Romanian sailor

Personal information
- Nationality: Romanian
- Born: 9 October 1960 (age 64)

Sport
- Sport: Sailing

Horia Ispaș (born 9 October 1960) is a Romanian sailor. He competed in the Laser event at the 1996 Summer Olympics.
