= Yoichi Iijima =

Japanese sailor (born 1978)

Personal information
- Full name: Yoichi Iijima
- Nationality: Japan
- Born: 21 October 1978 (age 47) Tokyo, Japan
- Height: 173 cm (5 ft 8 in)
- Weight: 72 kg (159 lb)

Sailing career
- Sport: Sailing
- Club: Laser Zuyo Fleet
- Coached by: Tomoyuki Sasaki
- Class: Dinghy
Medal record
Men's sailing
Representing Japan
Asian Games
| Silver medal – second place | 2006 Doha | Laser |

Yoichi Iijima (飯島 洋一, Iijima Yoichi; born 21 October 1978) is a Japanese sailor, who specialized in the Laser class. He nabbed a silver medal in men's Laser at the 2006 Asian Games in Doha, Qatar, and was selected to the Japanese sailing team at the 2008 Summer Olympics, finishing thirty-fifth in the process. Throughout his sporting career, Iijima trained for Laser Zuyo Fleet in Kanagawa under his longtime coach Tomoyuki Sasaki.

Born in Tokyo, Iijima burst onto the international sailing scene at the 2006 Asian Games in Doha, Qatar, where he picked up the silver medal in the Laser class with 31 marks, edging out the defending Asian Games champion Kim Ho-kon of South Korea by a close, four-point margin.

At the 2008 Summer Olympics in Beijing, Iijima qualified for the Japanese team in the Laser class after having secured a berth and finishing tenth from the Laser World Championships in Terrigal, New South Wales, Australia. Iijima sailed brilliantly from the start with satisfying marks, but a black flag penalty in the middle leg of the eleven-race series, a disastrous eighth-leg feat, and a cancellation of the last race due to inclement weather dropped him to thirty-fifth in the overall leaderboard with a net grade of 235.
