= 2021 World Military Sailing Championship =

Event title
- Edition: 52nd

Event details
- Venue: Marín, Pontevedra, Spain
- Dates: 6–12 June
- Yachts: Snipe

The 2021 World Military Sailing Championship was the 52nd edition of the World Military Sailing Championships. It was hosted by the Escuela Naval Militar and held in Marín, Pontevedra (Spain) June 6-12, 2021.

The championship was the first competition organised by the International Military Sports Council after the COVID-19 pandemic.

Boats used were in the Snipe international class.

Niccolò Bertola and Sveva Carraro (Italy) won the championship. Second place was for Maksim Semerkhanov and Anzhelika Cherniakhovskaia (Russia), and third place for Andrii Husenko and Sofiia Naumenko (Ukraine).

== Results ==
Results of individual races
Pos	Crew	Country	I	II	III	IV	V	VI	VII	VIII	IX	X	XI	XII	Tot	Pts
Gold medal	Niccolo Bertola; Sveva Carraro	Italy	1	1	1	1	2	1	1	2	1	2	1	2	16	14
Silver medal	Maksim Semerkhanov; Anzhelika Cherniakhovskaia	Russia	2	2	2	2	1	4	3	5	4	1	3	1	30	25
Bronze medal	Andrii Husenko; Sofiia Naumenko	Ukraine	8	7	3	3	5	3	6	4	3	4	2	3	51	43
4	Enrique Pomares; Carmen Rosales	Spain	7	5	5	DNF	4	2	2	6	6	5	4	4	60	50
5	Ariane Regaud; Vincent Guillarm	France	6	4	4	4	3	6	8	3	5	6	6	5	60	52
6	Sofia Bekatorou; Stylianos Sotiriou	Greece	4	6	8	6	6	7	4	1	2	3	OCS	7	64	54
7	Caden Scheiblauer; Olivia de Olazarra	United States	5	3	6	5	8	5	5	7	8	7	5	6	70	62
8	Frederik Stage-Nielsen; Mette Richter	Denmark	3	8	7	8	7	8	7	8	7	8	7	OCS	88	78
9	Francisca Mauricio; Gonçalo Branco	Portugal	9	9	9	7	9	9	9	9	9	9	8	8	104	95

Legend: DNF – Did not finish; OCS – On the course side of the starting line;
