= Antón Garrote =

Spanish sailor

Personal information
- Nationality: Spanish
- Born: 17 August 1972 (age 52)

Sport
- Sport: Sailing

Antón Garrote (born 17 August 1972) is a Spanish sailor. He competed in the Laser event at the 1996 Summer Olympics.
