= Marty Essig =

Canadian sailor

Personal information
- Born: 1 June 1975 (age 51) Burlington, Ontario, Canada

Sport
- Sport: Sailing

Marty Essig (born 1 June 1975) is a Canadian sailor. He competed in the Laser event at the 2000 Summer Olympics.
