= Antonios Bougiouris =

Greek sailor

Personal information
- Nationality: Greek
- Born: 15 March 1974 (age 51); Ermoupoli, Greece

Sport
- Sport: Sailing

Antonios Bougiouris (born 15 March 1974) is a Greek sailor. He competed in the Laser event at the 2000 Summer Olympics.
