= Yang Fung =

Hong Kong sailor

Personal information
- Nationality: Hong Konger
- Born: 9 November 1968 (age 56)

Sport
- Sport: Sailing

Yang Fung (born 9 November 1968) is a Hong Kong sailor. He competed in the Laser event at the 1996 Summer Olympics.
