= Rod Davies (sailor) =

Canadian sailor

Personal information
- Born: 17 November 1969 (age 56) Ajax, Ontario, Canada

Sport
- Sport: Sailing

Rod Davies (born 17 November 1969) is a Canadian sailor. He competed in the Laser event at the 1996 Summer Olympics.
