= Hitmi Khalifa Al-Hitmi =

Qatari academic, marketing scholar, and rally driver

Hitmi Khalifa Al-hitmi
Personal information
- Nationality: Qatar
- Education: University of Edinburgh

Sport
- Sport: Rallying

Hitmi Khalifa Al-Hitmi is a Qatari academic, marketing scholar and author. He serves as an assistant Professor of Marketing at the College of Business and Economics at Qatar University. He has also been described in media profiles as working in the areas of marketing and e-commerce.
