= Sami Kooheji =

Bahraini sailor

Personal information
- Nationality: Bahraini
- Born: 28 March 1984 (age 41)

Sport
- Sport: Sailing

Sami Kooheji (born 28 March 1984) is a Bahraini sailor. He competed in the Laser event at the 2004 Summer Olympics.
