= 1998 ISAF Youth Sailing World Championships =

Event title
- Edition: 28th

Event details
- Venue: Simon's Town, South Africa
- Dates: 28 December 1998 - 5 January 1999

The 1998 ISAF Youth Sailing World Championships took place in Simon's Town, South Africa from 28 December, 1998, to 5 January, 1999. It was the 28th edition of the ISAF Youth Sailing World Championships.

== Competition format ==
=== Events and equipment ===
Event	Equipment
Men's dinghy (single hander)	Laser
Men's dinghy (double hander)	420
Men's windsurfer	Minstral
Women's dinghy (single hander)	Laser Radial
Women's dinghy (double hander)	420
Women's windsurfer	Minstral
Open Multihull	Hobie 16

== Summary ==
=== Medal table ===
* Host nation (South Africa)

Rank	Nation	Gold	Silver	Bronze	Total
1	France	1	2	1	4
2	Australia	1	0	1	2
2	Brazil	1	0	1	2
4	French Polynesia	1	0	0	1
4	New Zealand	1	0	0	1
4	Poland	1	0	0	1
4	South Africa*	1	0	0	1
8	Israel	0	2	0	2
9	Great Britain	0	1	1	2
10	Croatia	0	1	0	1
10	Netherlands	0	1	0	1
12	Hong Kong	0	0	1	1
12	Italy	0	0	1	1
12	Spain	0	0	1	1
Totals (14 entries)		7	7	7	21

=== Event medalists ===
==== Men's events ====
Event	First	Second	Third
Laser	Gareth Blanckenberg; South Africa	Marin Misura; Croatia	Francisco Sanchez Ferrer; Spain
420	Matthew Davies; Kevin Borrows; New Zealand	Shachaf Amir; Yogev Yosef; Israel	Nicolas Cau; David Deguine; France
Minstral	Ricardo Santos; Brazil	Alexandre Guyader; France	Nick Dempsey; Great Britain

==== Women's events ====
Event	First	Second	Third
Laser Radial	Katarzyna Deberny; Poland	Sarah Ayton; Great Britain	Jo Dikkenberg; Australia
420	Lisa Charlson; Sarah Gundersen; Australia	Johanna Innemee; Lobke Berkhout; Netherlands	Nicoletta Aloj; Nicole Spada; Italy
Minstral	Eugenie Raffin; France	Anat Kolondy; Israel	Wai Kei Chan; Hong Kong

==== Open events ====
Event	First	Second	Third
Hobie 16	Billy Besson; Tamatoa Audovin; French Polynesia	Matthieu Souben; Gurvan Bontemps; France	André Cahú; Victor Luiz Weinstein de Azevedo; Brazil
