= Félix Pruvot =

French sailor

Personal information
- Nationality: French
- Born: 6 April 1980 (age 44); Abidjan, Ivory Coast

Sport
- Sport: Sailing

Félix Pruvot (born 6 April 1980) is a French sailor. He competed in the Laser event at the 2004 Summer Olympics.
