= Kevin Lim (sailor) =

Malaysian sailor

Personal information
- Full name: Lim Leong Keat
- Born: 27 September 1976 (age 49) Petaling Jaya, Malaysia
- Height: 1.83 m (6 ft 0 in)
- Weight: 80 kg (176 lb)

Sailing career
- Sport: Sailing
- Club: Woollahra Sailing Club
- Class: Laser
Medal record
Men's sailing
Representing Malaysia
Asian Games
Silver medal – second place	1998 Bangkok	Laser
Silver medal – second place	2002 Busan	Laser

Kevin Lim Leong Keat (born 27 September 1976) is a Malaysian former sailor, who specialized in the Laser class. He bagged two silver medals at the Asian Games (1998 and 2002) and became the first-ever Malaysian athlete in history to compete in four editions of the Summer Olympic Games (1996, 2000, 2004, and 2008). Before retiring from the sport in late 2008, Lim trained most of his career at the Woollahra Sailing Club in Sydney.

Lim became the first Malaysian sailor to compete at the Olympics, making his debut as a 20-year-old in Atlanta 1996. There, he finished thirty-eighth overall in the inaugural Laser class with a net grade of 300. At the 2000 Summer Olympics in Sydney, Lim endured most of the races almost at the rear end of the field before finding his form to notch a second-place finish on the last leg, vaulting him to twenty-second overall with 145 net points.

Lim's sailing career thrived in the 2002 season, when he managed to repeat a silver-medal finish from Bangkok four years earlier at the Asian Games in Busan, South Korea, trailing the host nation's Kim Ho-kon by a seven-point deficit. Lim continued his Olympic quest for the third time with a 24th overall placement in Athens 2004, accumulating a net grade of 220.

Lim sought to bid for a golden finish at his fifth Asiad in 2006, but a yachting malfunction at the very start of the series slipped him off the podium to fourth in the Laser class. Unable to deliver a medal, Lim was excluded from the elite program for national athletes under the Malaysian Sports Council that forced him to skip the 2007 Worlds and pursue a full-time stint as a qualified doctor instead.

Twelve years after competing in his maiden Games, Lim qualified for his fourth Malaysian team, as a 31-year-old, in the Laser class at the 2008 Summer Olympics in Beijing. He finished fifteenth out of 52 sailors competing in the silver fleet to secure one of the ten quota places available at the Worlds six months earlier in Terrigal, New South Wales. Amid a black flag disqualification on the opening leg, Lim put together a sensational effort to finish the ten-race series in 38th position with a net grade of 249.
