= Topaz Omega =

Type of dinghy

Development
- Name: Topaz Omega

Boat
- Crew: 1–7
- Trapeze: Optional

Hull
- Type: Monohull
- Construction: Topaz TRILAM
- Hull weight: 160 kg (350 lb)
- LOA: 4.7 m (15 ft 5 in)
- Beam: 1.88 m (6 ft 2 in)

Hull appendages
- Keel: Centerboard

Sails
- Mainsail area: 10.27 m^{2} (110.5 sq ft)
- Jib/genoa area: 3.75 m^{2} (40.4 sq ft)
- Spinnaker area: 14.66 m^{2} (157.8 sq ft)

Racing
- RYA PN: 1075

The Topaz Omega is a sailing dinghy created by Topper International designed for between 1 and 7 crew members. It is sailed at many clubs around the world and is an ISAF 'Learn to Sail' class.

== Performance and design ==
The Omega is a three-sail sailing dinghy in the Topper range. It is the largest hull in the range and can accommodate up to six people. The hull is beamy with hard chines, which contributes to stability and ease of control. It has a large cockpit and a gnav kicker. The design is used for club racing, sailing instruction, and recreational sailing. The mainsail features a zip-reefing system, which allows the boat to be sailed single-handed.
