= John Myrdal (sailor) =

American sailor

Personal information
- Born: June 3, 1971 (age 55) Honolulu, Hawaii, United States

Sport
- Sport: Sailing
- College team: University of Hawaii at Manoa

John Myrdal (born June 3, 1971) is an American sailor. He competed in the Laser event at the 2000 Summer Olympics.
