= Alp Alpagut =

Turkish sailor

Personal information
- Nationality: Turkish
- Born: 9 January 1974 (age 52)

Sport
- Sport: Sailing

Alp Alpagut (born 8 January 1974) is a Turkish sailor. He competed in the Laser event at the 1996 Summer Olympics.
