= Philippe Bergmans =

Belgian sailor

Personal information
- Full name: Philippe Bergmans
- Nationality: Belgium
- Born: 2 May 1974 (age 52) Ithaca, New York, United States
- Height: 1.83 m (6 ft 0 in)
- Weight: 79 kg (174 lb)

Sailing career
- Sport: Sailing
- Club: Royal Belgian Sailing Club
- Coached by: Filip Willems
- Class: Dinghy

Philippe Bergmans (born 2 May 1974) is a Belgian former sailor, who specialized in the Laser class. He won a gold medal at the 2004 European Laser Championships in Warnemünde, Germany, and was selected to compete for Belgium in three editions of the Olympic Games (1996, 2000, and 2004). Before his retirement came at the end of 2004 season, Bergman trained for the Royal Belgian Sailing Club, under the tutelage of head coach Filip Willems.

Bergmans made his Olympic debut in Atlanta 1996, finishing eighteenth overall in the inaugural Laser class with a satisfying net grade of 144. At the 2000 Summer Olympics in Sydney, Bergmans endured most of the races with steady marks before finding his form to the front of the fleet with his only triumph on the last leg, vaulting him to sixteenth with 116 net points.

Eight years after competing in his maiden Games, Bergmans qualified for his third Belgian team, as a 30-year-old, in the Laser class at the 2004 Summer Olympics in Athens. Building up to his Olympic selection, he put together an exemplary scorecard to win the gold medal by 21 points ahead of Great Britain's Paul Goodison at the Europeans two weeks earlier. Bergmans got off to a credible start of the series with three top-ten marks, but a lackluster display on the remainder of the series saw him stumble down the leaderboard to eighteenth place with a net grade of 159.
