= Tiko Crofoot =

Fijian sailor (born 1979)

Personal information
- Nationality: Fijian
- Born: 29 January 1979 (age 46)

Sport
- Sport: Sailing

Tiko Crofoot (born 29 January 1979) is a Fijian sailor. He competed in the Laser event at the 1996 Summer Olympics.
