= Rod Davies =

British astronomer

Rodney Deane Davies CBE FRS
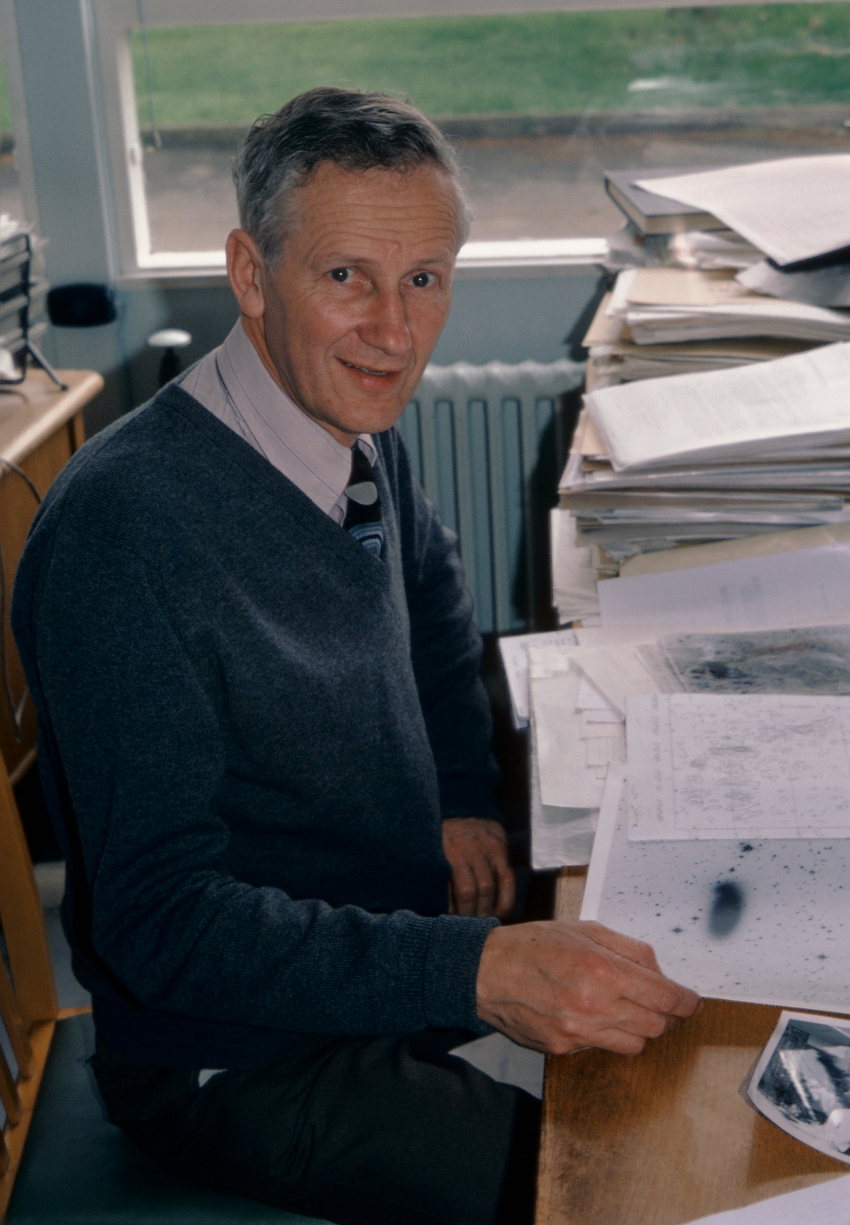
- Davies in 1981
- Born: 8 January 1930
- Died: October 8, 2015 (aged 85)
- Scientific career
- Fields: radio astronomy

Rodney Deane Davies CBE FRS (8 January 1930 – 8 November 2015) was a professor of Radio Astronomy at the University of Manchester. He was the President of the Royal Astronomical Society in 1987–1989, and the Director of Jodrell Bank Observatory in 1988–97. He is best known for his research on the Cosmic microwave background and the 21cm line.

== Personal life ==
Davies was born on 8 January 1930 into a family of farmers in Balaklava, a village north of Adelaide, South Australia. His parents were Holbin and Rena Davies. He had three brothers.

He met Beth, his wife, at the Student Christian Movement at the University of Adelaide. They married in 1953, and later that same year they moved to Cheshire, United Kingdom. They had four children: Rosalyn, Claire, Stewart and Warwick (who predeceased him), and eleven grandchildren: Luke, Josh (m. Cat), Dom, Hannah, Nyasha, Laura, Eleanor, Hettie, Annie, Leo, and Jemima.

He became a Methodist preacher at the age of 16 at his church in South Australia, and regularly attended his Methodist chapel in Manchester. He also had an extensive knowledge of trees.

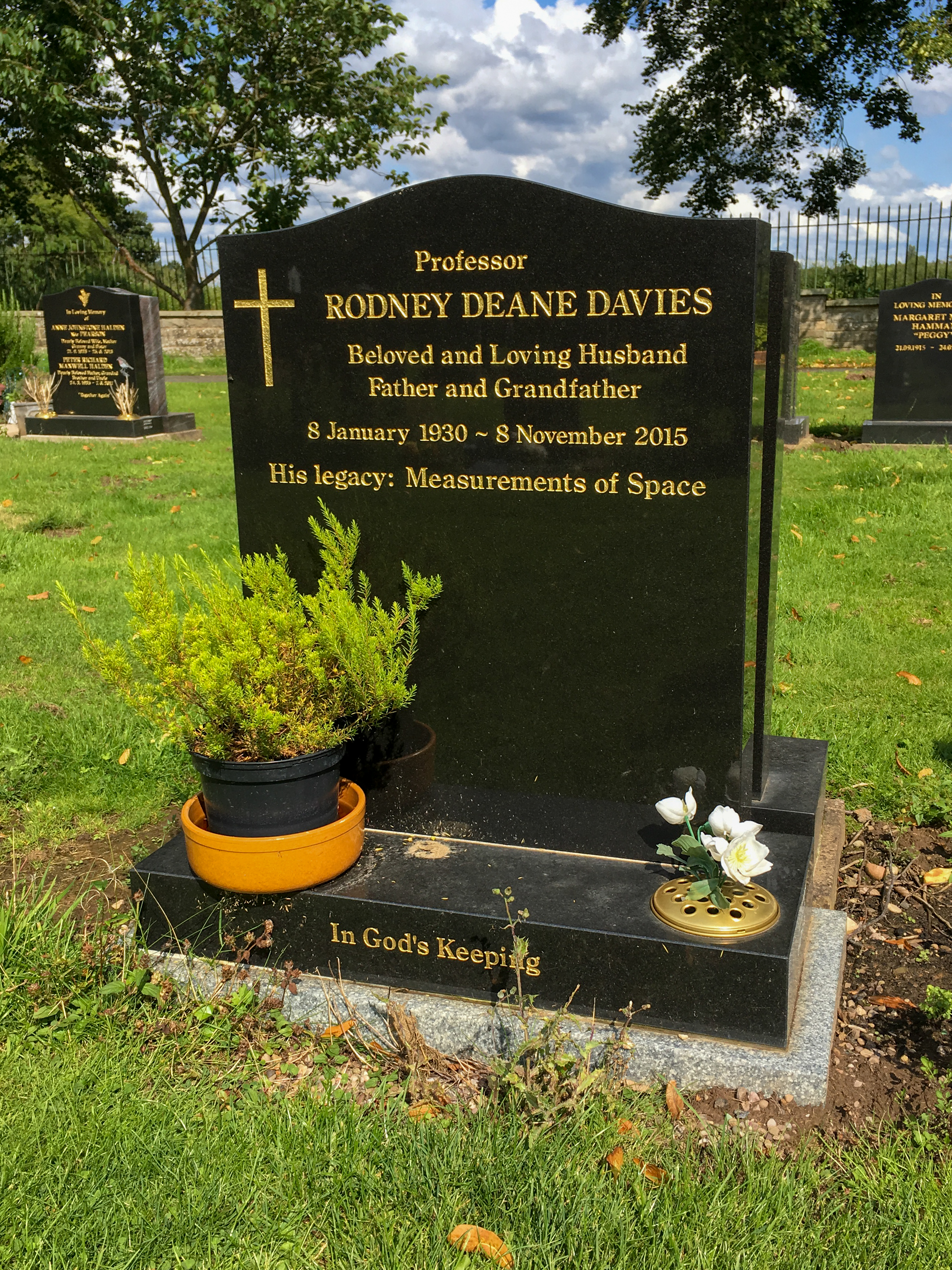
Rod Davies' gravestone at Alderley Edge Cemetery

He suffered from cancer, but carried on working regardless. His health declined in the last two months of his life, and he died on 8 November 2015.

== Education and career ==
He went to Adelaide High School. In 1946 he was awarded a scholarship to study physics at the University of Adelaide, receiving an Honours degree in 1951. He then became a Research Officer in the Radiophysics Division of CSIRO in Sydney, observing radio bursts from the Sun.

When he was 23 he sent an airmail letter to Bernard Lovell, a friend of his then-boss Joe Pawsey, asking for a position at Jodrell Bank Observatory, and he was subsequently appointed Assistant Lecturer at the University of Manchester in 1953. He was awarded a PhD in 1956 on his work measuring the distance of galaxies using the 21cm line, examined by Jan Oort. He was the Director of Jodrell Bank Observatory from 1988 until 1997.

He was the President of the Royal Astronomical Society in 1987–89. He became a Fellow of the Royal Society in 1992. He received a CBE in 1995. He retired in 1997, but he continued to actively work at Jodrell Bank until his death.

== Research ==
Over the course of his career, he published over 500 scientific papers. His research focused on the large-scale structure of the Universe. He studied emission from the Hydrogen line in galaxies, providing insight into the Hubble flow. He observed OH emission using interferometers.

He was best known for his work measuring the Cosmic Microwave Background emission, providing upper limits on the CMB anisotropies, which began with observations on cold winter nights at Jodrell Bank Observatory in the late 1970s, before relocating his telescopes 2,400 metres (7,900 ft) up the mountain on Tenerife in the early 1980s to take advantage of the clearer atmosphere at that location. By the early 1990s his instruments had detected the anisotropies of the CMB, however the publication of his results came after the results of the Cosmic Background Explorer had been announced; the COBE team went on to win the Nobel Prize for Physics for their discovery.

He also led research on the emission of the Milky Way as measured by CMB experiments. He worked on the Planck satellite, co-coordinating the Planck projects on Galactic and Solar System science.

He continued his research over 18 years after his retirement, with his final paper published several months after his death.
