= Andreas Geritzer =

Austrian sailor

Medal record

Sailing

Representing Austria

Olympic Games
Silver medal – second place	2004 Athens	Laser

Andreas Geritzer (born 11 December 1977, in Vienna) is an Austrian sailor in the Laser class.

At the 2000 Summer Olympics in Sydney he finished fifth, four years later at the 2004 Summer Olympics in Athens he won the Silver medal. Geritzer resides and trains in Neusiedl am See. He has been married since 2005, and has a son.

== Achievements ==
- EC-Bronze 1998 and 2005
- WC-Silver 2002
- Second place at Kiel Week 2004
- Silver medal at the Olympic Games 2004 in Athens
