= Mario Aquilina =

Maltese sailor

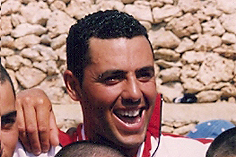

Personal information
- Full name: Mario Aquilina
- Nationality: Malta
- Born: 18 November 1975 (age 50) Birżebbuġa, Malta
- Height: 1.79 m (5 ft 10 1/2 in)
- Weight: 80 kg (176 lb)

Sailing career
- Sport: Sailing
- Club: Birzebbbuga Sailing Club
- Coached by: Peter Valentino
- Class: Dinghy

Mario Aquilina (born 18 November 1975 in Birżebbuġa) is a retired Maltese sailor, who specialized in the Laser class. He represented his nation Malta in two editions of the Olympic Games (2000 and 2004), and has been a full-fledged member of the Birzebbuga Sailing Club throughout his sailing career, training under head coach Peter Valentino. Having the prestige to represent his nation in two Olympic Games, Aquilina has been nominated several times as the Sailor of the Year by the Malta Sailing Federation.

Aquilina made his official debut, as a lone sailor, at the 2000 Summer Olympics in Sydney, where he placed thirty-seventh in the Laser class with a remarkable grade of 272, surpassing Singapore's Stanley Tan by a three-point advantage.

At the 2004 Summer Olympics in Athens, Aquilina qualified for his second Maltese team, as a 29-year-old, in the Laser class by granting a tripartite invitation from the International Sailing Federation. Unlike his previous Olympics, Aquilina could not upgrade his position with a net score of 339 points and a thirty-ninth-place effort in a fleet of forty-two sailors.
