= Kim Ho-kon (sailor) =

South Korean sailor (born 1971)

Personal information
- Nationality: South Korea
- Born: 30 January 1971 (age 55) Daegu, South Korea
- Height: 1.84 m (6 ft 0 in)
- Weight: 84 kg (185 lb)

Sailing career
- Sport: Sailing
- Club: Daegu Urban Development Corp.
- Class: Dinghy
Medal record
Men's sailing
Representing South Korea
Asian Games
Gold medal – first place	1998 Bangkok	Laser
Gold medal – first place	2002 Busan	Laser
Bronze medal – third place	2006 Doha	Laser

Kim Ho-kon (Korean: 김호곤, also known as Kim Ho-gon, born 30 January 1971) is a South Korean former sailor, who specialized in the Laser class. Regarded as one of South Korea's most successful sailors in history, Kim has appeared in three editions of the Olympic Games (1996, 2000, and 2004) and has produced a tally of three medals (two golds and one bronze) in the Laser class at the Asian Games.

Kim made his Olympic debut in Atlanta 1996, finishing twenty-third overall in the inaugural Laser class with a satisfying net grade of 170. At the 2000 Summer Olympics in Sydney, Kim was not able to improve his previous Olympic feat with mediocre marks recorded throughout the eleven-race series, sitting him in the twenty-sixth position with 181 net points.

When South Korea hosted the 2002 Asian Games in Busan, Kim sailed powerfully in front of the home crowd to defend his gold medal from Bangkok four years earlier in the Laser class with a marvelous grade of 8.

Eight years after competing in his maiden Games, Kim qualified for his third South Korean team, as a 33-year-old, in the Laser class at the 2004 Summer Olympics in Athens. Building up to his Olympic selection, he placed thirty-ninth at the class-associated Worlds three months earlier in Bodrum, Turkey. Sitting almost at the rear end of the forty-two-man field with few marks lower than the top thirty recorded, Kim accumulated a net score of 255 points to finish the eleven-leg series in thirty-second overall.
