= Tamás Eszes (sailor) =

Hungarian sailor

Tamás Eszes (born 18 June 1976 in Keszthely) is a Laser Standard sailor from Hungary, who competed in two consecutive Summer Olympics for his native country (Atlanta, Sydney). He was trained by Trevor Millar who is the founder of SailCoach. Tamás created Sail Coach Hungary in 2010. After Sail Coach Hungary, he established the European Sailing Academy in 2016. He is currently the leader and head coach of his team at the Academy, hosting training camps in the Canary Islands as his sailing base. 4 nations (Switzerland, Greece, India, Spain) qualified to the Tokyo 2020 Olympic Games in Laser Radial class following Tamas's coaching program between 2016 and 2021.
