= Gareth Blanckenberg =

South African sailor (born 1980)

Personal information
- Nationality: South Africa
- Born: 3 June 1980 (age 46) Durban, South Africa
- Height: 1.88 m (6 ft 2 in)
- Weight: 80 kg (176 lb)

Sailing career
- Sport: Sailing
- Club: Imperial Yacht Club
- Coached by: Trevor Millar (IRL)
- Class: Dinghy

Gareth Blanckenberg (born 3 June 1980, in Durban) is a retired South African sailor, who specialized in the Laser class. He obtained top twenty finishes on his respective category in two editions of the Olympic Games (2000 and 2004), and has also been training throughout most of his sailing career for Imperial Yacht Club in Cape Town, under his Irish-born personal coach Trevor Millar.

Blanckenberg made his official debut at the 2000 Summer Olympics in Sydney, where he competed in the Laser class. Sailing through the eleven-race series, he scored a career best result in the fifth heat with a momentous lead over a vast fleet of forty-three sailors, but dropped shortly to ninth in the medal round with a net score of 92.

At the 2004 Summer Olympics in Athens, Blanckenberg qualified for his second South African team, as a 24-year-old lone sailor, in the Laser class by placing eighth and obtaining a berth from the 2003 ISAF World Championships in Cadiz, Spain. Unlike his previous Olympics, Blanckenberg could not compensate from an early surge in the opening to climb again on top of the rankings, as he finished seventeenth out of forty-two sailors in the official fleet with a net score of 156.
