= 2023 Sailing World Championships – Women's iQFoil =

Women's iQFoil at the 2023 Sailing World Championships
- Venue: The Hague, the Netherlands
- Dates: 14–20 August
- Competitors: 88 from 33 nations

Medalists
gold medal	Shahar Tibi	Israel
silver medal	Katy Spychakov	Israel
bronze medal	Emma Wilson	Great Britain

The women's iQFoil competition at the 2023 Sailing World Championships was the women's windsurfer event and was held in The Hague, the Netherlands, 14–20 August 2023. The entries were limited to 100 boards. The competitors participated in an opening series that was planned to 20 races, followed by a medal series. The medal series was planned for 19 August.

The competition served as a qualifying event for the 2024 Olympic sailing competition with 11 out of 24 national quota being distributed at the event.

== Summary ==
Marta Magetti of Italy was the reigning world champion, having won the 2022 iQFoil World Championships in Brest, France, while Sharon Kantor of Israel had won the Paris 2024 Test Event the month before. In the Sailing World Cup, Emma Wilson of Great Britain ad won the Trofeo Princesa Sofía, Barbora Švíková of the Czech Republic had won the Semaine Olympique Française, and Lærke Buhl-Hansen of Denmark had won the Kiel Week.

On 15 August, Wilson started the racing with one bullet and four other top-four finishes, while Hélène Noesmoen of France were two points behind. No wind limited the possibility to sail on 18 August.

From the opening series results, Wilson qualified directly to the final, while Shahar Tibi and Katy Spychakov, both of Israel, made it to the semi-final. Tibi won the championship title by winning the medal series, ahead of Spychakov, also Israel, with Wilson to receive the bronze medal. Tibi dedicated her win to Israel former windsurfer and four-time world champion Lee Korzits, who was suffering from polycythemia vera.

With the final results, national quotas were awarded Israel, Great Britain, Norway, China, Mexico, Italy, the Netherlands, Spain, Croatia, Poland, and New Zealand.

== Results ==
=== Opening series ===
Results of individual races
Pos	Helmsman	Country	I	II	III	IV	V	VI	VII	VIII	IX	X	XI	XII	XIII	XIV	Tot	Pts
1	Emma Wilson	Great Britain	4	3	2	1	2	7^{†}	7^{†}	1	3	10^{†}	1	1	3	6	51	27
2	Shahar Tibi	Israel	3	10^{†}	1	8	5	3	11^{†}	1	1	15^{†}	4	5	6	1	74	38
3	Katy Spychakov	Israel	5	2	5	3	19^{†}	5	BFD 47^{†}	1	7	28^{†}	7	2	1	2	134	40
4	Marta Maggetti	Italy	6	11^{†}	10^{†}	2	3	5	9	3	1	11	2	RET 45^{†}	5	3	116	50
5	Sharon Kantor	Israel	1	13	2	7	30^{†}	1	3	1	19^{†}	9	11^{†}	11	2	5	115	55
6	Yan Zheng	China	1	5	4	8^{†}	1	11^{†}	5	3	1	19	31^{†}	9	10	7	115	65
7	Hélène Noesmoen	France	5	7^{†}	3	1	1	7	1	13^{†}	7	34^{†}	3	7	16	27	132	78
8	Mina Mobekk	Norway	8	3	4	4	4	15^{†}	3	15^{†}	11	1	34^{†}	12	4	24	142	78
9	Tamar Steinberg	Israel	8	18	1	21	6	1	35^{†}	37^{†}	1	8	8	8	12^{†}	4	168	84
10	Mariana Aguilar	Mexico	3	8	12	16^{†}	7	5	RDG 9	25^{†}	3	27^{†}	12	14	8	12	161	93
11	Sara Wennekes	Netherlands	13	1	7	3	3	1	1	BFD 47^{†}	DNF 47^{†}	7	19	30^{†}	30	10	219	95
12	Pilar Lamadrid	Spain	2	17^{†}	8	2	6	11	5	19^{†}	17	5	5	3	34^{†}	31	165	95
13	Shahar Reshef	Israel	10	12	8	7	36^{†}	7	BFD 47^{†}	5	3	3	33^{†}	13	23	11	218	102
14	Palma Čargo	Croatia	10	8	5	14	7	9	1	BFD 47^{†}	15^{†}	2	9	24	14	38^{†}	203	103
15	Maya Morris	Israel	16	17^{†}	6	20^{†}	12	3	5	5	11	4	35^{†}	22	13	16	185	113
16	Giorgia Speciale	Italy	2	19^{†}	15^{†}	5	5	13	3	9	15	RDG 20	22	6	38^{†}	14	186	114
17	Huang Xianting	China	7	2	13	11	9	19	9	21^{†}	29^{†}	18	15	23^{†}	7	8	191	118
18	Lola Sorin	France	9	6	6	20^{†}	15^{†}	7	1	5	3	17	20	29	24	33^{†}	195	127
19	Maja Dziarnowska	Poland	12	4	13^{†}	6	8	11	7	23^{†}	7	25^{†}	17	16	17	23	189	128
20	Nicole van der Velden	Spain	24^{†}	24	23	10	26^{†}	3	9	3	5	12	RDG 15.8	20	9	22^{†}	205.8	133.8
21	Lilian de Geus	Netherlands	9	21^{†}	18^{†}	13	4	3	3	3	13	14	32^{†}	21	19	32	205	134
22	Veerle ten Have	New Zealand	25^{†}	18	10	17	8	9	BFD 47^{†}	9	11	21	13	4	26	37^{†}	255	146
23	Islay Watson	Great Britain	18	23	3	12	15	41^{†}	BFD 47^{†}	7	21	RDG 16	6	18	11	29^{†}	267	150
24	Delphine Cousin	France	17	10	26^{†}	26	34^{†}	9	13	7	19	16	10	10	20	DNF 45^{†}	262	157
25	María Belén Bazo	Peru	7	9	9	18^{†}	UFD 47^{†}	5	9	11	9	30	25	19	37^{†}	28	263	161
26	Helle Oppedal	Norway	20	6	11	19	9	13	29^{†}	9	DNF 47^{†}	13	23	27^{†}	27	13	266	163
27	Theresa Marie Steinlein	Germany	13	1	7	4	11	1	7	29^{†}	25^{†}	29	40^{†}	37	18	36	258	164
28	Maja Kuchta	Poland	15	27^{†}	22	25^{†}	18	17	15	15	5	6	21^{†}	15	21	20	242	169
29	Daniela Peleg	Israel	11	14^{†}	35^{†}	9	13	13	5	7	5	33	38^{†}	34	25	15	257	170
30	Tan Xialing	China	27^{†}	14	9	21^{†}	13	15	17	13	7	26	14	26	28	39^{†}	269	182
31	Manon Pianazza	France	15	13	23^{†}	10	18	21^{†}	15	11	5	32	39^{†}	32	22	19	275	192
32	Saskia Sills	Great Britain	4	4	20	23^{†}	10	23^{†}	17	21	11	41^{†}	30	33	36	9	282	195
33	Lucie Belbeoch	France	19	22^{†}	17	14	10	19	DSQ 47^{†}	5	13	39	41^{†}	25	15	21	307	197
34	Lærke Buhl-Hansen	Denmark	RDG 11.5	11	15	9	11	19^{†}	BFD 47^{†}	9	13	DSQ 45^{†}	24	28	35	40	317.5	206.5
35	Tuva Oppedal	Norway	22	7	14	29^{†}	20	17	11	37^{†}	23	20	27	41^{†}	29	18	315	208
36	Barbora Švíková	Czech Republic	14	20	16	23	27^{†}	17	31^{†}	15	15	22	16	31^{†}	31	30	308	219
37	Alice Read	Great Britain	17	12	21	24^{†}	24^{†}	19	11	17	21	23	29	38	41^{†}	17	314	225
38	Zofia Klepacka	Poland	12	19	25	29^{†}	29^{†}	23	19	11	15	40^{†}	28	17	RDG 28.3	RDG 28.3	323.6	225.6
39	Maya Gysler	Norway	18	20	11	5	2	21	23	37^{†}	29^{†}	24	DSQ 45^{†}	39	DSQ 45	26	345	234
40	Kateřina Švíková	Czech Republic	16	5	12	22	23^{†}	15	17	25^{†}	21	36	26	35	32	42^{†}	327	237
41	Du Jie	China	24	16	25^{†}	11	22	39^{†}	13	21	9	37	18	43^{†}	42	35	355	248
42	Zheng Manjia	China	11	9	16	16	12	DNC 47^{†}	BFD 47^{†}	27	35	31	36	40^{†}	33	34	394	260
43	Yuki Sunaga	Japan	6	21	26	UFD 47^{†}	16	25	25	7	DNF 47^{†}	38	37	42^{†}	39	25	401	265
44	Lu Yunxiu	China	DNF 45^{†}	16	18	19	19	21	19	29^{†}	9	35	42^{†}	36	40	41	389	273
45	Alisa Engelmann	Germany	21	15	19	24	21	37^{†}	13	17	BFD 47^{†}	16^{†}	5	3	10	9	257	157
46	Kwan Ching Ma	Hong Kong	26	26	21	31^{†}	37^{†}	9	15	21	27	6	25^{†}	7	1	2	254	161
47	Lena Erdil	Germany	33^{†}	15	17	34^{†}	20	31	25	17	23	1	1	14^{†}	6	10	247	166
48	Natasa Lappa	Cyprus	20	26	14	27	35^{†}	25	21	11	31^{†}	13	28^{†}	5	2	13	271	177
49	Andrea Torres	Spain	21	30^{†}	27	6	25	27	BFD 47^{†}	27	19	14	UFD 45^{†}	8	7	1	304	182
50	Dominique Stater	United States	19	23	19	13	27	17	19	BFD 47^{†}	DNF 47^{†}	26^{†}	9	11	21	RDG 16.8	314.8	194.8
51	Lina Eržen	Slovenia	28	UFD 45^{†}	37^{†}	32	14	11	11	23	9	32^{†}	2	26	9	31	310	196
52	Merve Vatan	Turkey	36^{†}	33	27	28	23	15	7	33	41^{†}	20	30^{†}	9	4	5	311	204
53	Ingrid Puusta	Estonia	23	25	29	12	28	35	BFD 47^{†}	19	DNC 47^{†}	8	4	12	13^{†}	12	314	207
54	Dilara Uralp	Turkey	23	27	24	15	30^{†}	29	29	15	DNF 47^{†}	10	12	4	26^{†}	22	313	210
55	Kristýna Piňosová	Czech Republic	31	29	32	30	17	25	RDG 27	33^{†}	BFD 47^{†}	4	17^{†}	1	8	7	308	211
56	Aleksandra Blinnikka	Finland	26	41^{†}	33	30	14	21	BFD 47^{†}	35	25	5	15^{†}	6	11	6	315	212
57	Kateřina Altmannová	Czech Republic	29	30	33^{†}	22	43^{†}	27	13	23	19	29	16	36^{†}	3	3	326	214
58	Johanna Hjertberg	Sweden	14	38	41	18	40	25	BFD 47^{†}	23	DNF 47^{†}	11	7	2	25^{†}	11	349	230
59	Fujiko Onishi	Japan	28	35^{†}	30	15	33	37^{†}	33	19	13	18	26^{†}	15	14	15	331	233
60	Marion Couturier	France	27	28	29	34^{†}	29	13	DSQ 47^{†}	17	17	3	10	19	RET 45^{†}	DNF 45	363	237
61	Jennie Roberts	Great Britain	22	29	28	31	22	35^{†}	27	25	DNF 47^{†}	25^{†}	18	18	17	8	352	245
62	Emma Viktoria Millend	Estonia	34	24	42	33	26	27	21	43^{†}	DNF 47^{†}	2	8	23	5	37^{†}	372	245
63	Samantha Costin	Australia	36^{†}	22	24	28	31	35^{†}	27	29	23	12	24	28^{†}	20	18	357	258
64	Danae Pontifex	Greece	29	36	39^{†}	38^{†}	17	27	21	13	21	28	37^{†}	27	22	19	374	260
65	Danicka Sailer	United States	35	33	42^{†}	36	37	23	19	33	DNF 47^{†}	7	36^{†}	21	15	4	388	263
66	Aimee Bright	New Zealand	25	25	22	38^{†}	16	29	15	39^{†}	33	36^{†}	22	34	29	14	377	264
67	Giovanna Prada	Brazil	39^{†}	37	32	26	34	23	23	39^{†}	25	34^{†}	11	20	16	20	379	267
68	Lucy Kenyon	Great Britain	31	31	31	37^{†}	21	29	RDG 25	41^{†}	17	23	23	29^{†}	19	23	380	273
69	Fianne Brule	Netherlands	35^{†}	34	38^{†}	35	24	33	25	35	23	9	14	32^{†}	32	16	385	280
70	Helena Wanser	Germany	32	32	31	25	28	29	37^{†}	25	33^{†}	33^{†}	6	25	27	21	384	281
71	Catrin Williams	Great Britain	33	35	28	39	31	31	BFD 47^{†}	29	DNF 47^{†}	19	3	22	12	33^{†}	409	282
72	Sofie Hammeken	Denmark	32	28	34	40^{†}	38^{†}	31	27	31	31	17	34	16	31	35^{†}	425	312
73	Aikaterini Divari	Greece	30	UFD 45^{†}	39	27	33	41^{†}	39	33	17	31	19	17	28	34^{†}	433	313
74	Bryn Muller	United States	38	41^{†}	20	36	25	31	35	27	DNF 47^{†}	30	13	40^{†}	37	26	446	318
75	Junna Watanabe	Japan	42^{†}	36	34	37	42^{†}	33	31	31	39	22	21	31^{†}	18	17	434	319
76	Bruna Martinelli	Brazil	34	34	37^{†}	35	36	33	23	41^{†}	27	35^{†}	35	10	30	29	439	326
77	Manon Berger	Switzerland	37	32	35	32	41	35	BFD 47^{†}	39	DNF 47^{†}	21	27	13	36^{†}	24	466	336
78	Sofia Hämäläinen	Finland	39	39	40^{†}	42^{†}	32	39	29	31	31	24	29	38^{†}	23	25	461	341
79	Lorena Abicht	Austria	43^{†}	38	41	40	38	33	17	13	DNF 47^{†}	37	31	30	39^{†}	30	477	348
80	Anna Weis	United States	40	31	30	17	40	43^{†}	23	19	DNF 47^{†}	27	32	DNC 45^{†}	DNC 45	DNC 45	484	349
81	Elena Sandera	Switzerland	37	40	36	DNF 47^{†}	35	39	41	31	DNF 47^{†}	15	20	39	24	DNF 45^{†}	496	357
82	Stella Bilger	New Zealand	30	40^{†}	36	33	39^{†}	39	33	35	37	39^{†}	38	24	35	36	494	376
83	Cristina Ortiz Vivas	Mexico	38	39	40	39	32	41^{†}	33	43^{†}	27	41^{†}	40	35	34	28	510	385
84	Cecilia Haslund Oreskov	Denmark	41	37	44^{†}	41	39	37	31	35	DNF 47^{†}	38^{†}	33	33	33	27	516	387
85	Miki Yamabe	Japan	44^{†}	42	43^{†}	43	41	37	21	27	29	40^{†}	39	37	40	32	515	388
86	Sara Szentivanyi	Hungary	DNF 45	42	38	42	42	41	BFD 47^{†}	37	DNF 47^{†}	42	DNF 45^{†}	BFD 45	38	38	589	450
87	Rebecca Heller	Canada	RET 45^{†}	DNF 45	43	41	43	43	35	41	DNF 47^{†}	43	41	41	41	DNF 45^{†}	594	457
88	Katya Coelho	India	DNF 45	DNF 45	DNF 47^{†}	DNF 47^{†}	DNC 47	DNF 47	43	43	DNF 47	DNC 45^{†}	DNC 45	DNC 45	DNC 45	DNC 45	636	497

Scoring system: low-point system; Source:
Legend: – Advance to final; – Advance to semi-final; – Advance to quarter-final; BFD – Black flag disqualification; DNC – Did not come to the starting area; DNF – Did not finish; DSQ – Disqualified; RDG – Redress given; RET – Retired; UFD – "U" flag disqualification; † – Discarded race not counted in the overall result;

=== Medal series ===
Results of individual races
Pos	Helmsman	Country	QF	SF	F
Gold medal	Shahar Tibi	Israel	–	1	1
Silver medal	Katy Spychakov	Israel	–	2	2
Bronze medal	Emma Wilson	Great Britain	–	–	3
4	Mina Mobekk	Norway	2	3	–
5	Hélène Noesmoen	France	1	4	–
6	Tamar Steinberg	Israel	STP 3.6	–	–
7	Sharon Kantor	Israel	4	–	–
8	Yan Zheng	China	5	–	–
9	Mariana Aguilar	Mexico	6	–	–
10	Marta Maggetti	Italy	7	–	–

Legend: STP – Standard penalty imposed;
