= Techno 293 World Championships =

Youth Windsurfing sailing regatta

The Techno 293 World Championships is an bi-annual international sailing regatta of Techno 293 windsurfer, organized by the host club on behalf of the International Class Association and recognized by World Sailing, the sports IOC recognized governing body. It has been hosted annual since 2006 when the class took over as the primary international youth course racing windsurfer class from the Aloha class and the Aloha World Championships.

== Events ==
Editions			Host			Category		Sailor No.				Ref.
No.	Date	Year	Host club	Location	Nat.	Gender	Age	M	F	Nat.	Cont.	Ref.
1	30Jul -6Aug	2006	Lega Navale Italiana Marsala	Marsala, Sicily	Italy	Open	U15	37	18	7	1	
1	30Jul -6Aug	2006	Lega Navale Italiana Marsala	Marsala, Sicily	Italy	Open	U17	39	15	9	2	
2	1-7 Sep	2007		Formentera, Ibiza	Spain	Male	U15	45	-	10	2	
2	1-7 Sep	2007		Formentera, Ibiza	Spain	Female	U15	-	14	7	1	
2	1-7 Sep	2007		Formentera, Ibiza	Spain	Male	U17	69	-	13	3	
2	1-7 Sep	2007		Formentera, Ibiza	Spain	Female	U17	-	37	11	3	
3	9-16 Aug	2008	Sopocki Klub Zeglarski	Sopot	Poland	Male	U15	48	-	12	1	
3	9-16 Aug	2008	Sopocki Klub Zeglarski	Sopot	Poland	Female	U15	-	25	9	1	
3	9-16 Aug	2008	Sopocki Klub Zeglarski	Sopot	Poland	Male	U17	74	-	11	2	
3	9-16 Aug	2008	Sopocki Klub Zeglarski	Sopot	Poland	Female	U17	-	34	9	1	
4	22-29 Aug	2009	Weymouth and Portland National Sailing Academy	Portland	United Kingdom	Male	U15	66	-	15	3	
4	22-29 Aug	2009	Weymouth and Portland National Sailing Academy	Portland	United Kingdom	Female	U15	-	22	7	1	
4	22-29 Aug	2009	Weymouth and Portland National Sailing Academy	Portland	United Kingdom	Male	U17	118	-	23	4	
4	22-29 Aug	2009	Weymouth and Portland National Sailing Academy	Portland	United Kingdom	Female	U17	-	0	14	3	
5	24-31 Jul	2010	Cercle de Voile de Martigues	Martigues, Bouches-du-Rhône	France	Male	U15	93	-	14	2	
5	24-31 Jul	2010	Cercle de Voile de Martigues	Martigues, Bouches-du-Rhône	France	Female	U15	-	34	10	2	
5	24-31 Jul	2010	Cercle de Voile de Martigues	Martigues, Bouches-du-Rhône	France	Male	U17	157	-	23	4	
5	24-31 Jul	2010	Cercle de Voile de Martigues	Martigues, Bouches-du-Rhône	France	Female	U17	-	61	19	4	
6	17-24 Jul	2011	St. Francis Yacht Club	Berkeley, San Francisco, California	United States	Male	U15	26	-	13	4	
6	17-24 Jul	2011	St. Francis Yacht Club	Berkeley, San Francisco, California	United States	Female	U15	-	10	8	4	
6	17-24 Jul	2011	St. Francis Yacht Club	Berkeley, San Francisco, California	United States	Male	U17	63	-	20	5	
6	17-24 Jul	2011	St. Francis Yacht Club	Berkeley, San Francisco, California	United States	Female	U17	-	32	14	5	
7	11-18 Aug	2012	Regatta Center Medemblik	Medemblik	Netherlands	Male	U15	88	-	18	4	
7	11-18 Aug	2012	Regatta Center Medemblik	Medemblik	Netherlands	Female	U15	-	32	14	3	
7	11-18 Aug	2012	Regatta Center Medemblik	Medemblik	Netherlands	Male	U17	130	-	25	6	
7	11-18 Aug	2012	Regatta Center Medemblik	Medemblik	Netherlands	Female	U17	-	70	17	5	
8	27Jul -3Aug	2013	Sopocki Klub Zeglarski	Sopot	Poland	Male	U15	91	-	19	3	
8	27Jul -3Aug	2013	Sopocki Klub Zeglarski	Sopot	Poland	Female	U15	-	28	12	3	
8	27Jul -3Aug	2013	Sopocki Klub Zeglarski	Sopot	Poland	Male	U17	159	-	29	5	
8	27Jul -3Aug	2013	Sopocki Klub Zeglarski	Sopot	Poland	Female	U17	-	74	23	4	
9	19-26 Jul	2014	Centre Nautique du Moulin Blanc	Brest, France	France	Male	U15	99	-	18	3	
9	19-26 Jul	2014	Centre Nautique du Moulin Blanc	Brest, France	France	Female	U15	-	35	11	2	
9	19-26 Jul	2014	Centre Nautique du Moulin Blanc	Brest, France	France	Male	U17	155	-	25	5	
9	19-26 Jul	2014	Centre Nautique du Moulin Blanc	Brest, France	France	Female	U17	-	72	21	3	
10	24-31 Oct	2015	Yacht Club Cagliari	Cagliari	Italy	Male	U15	84	-	20	5	
10	24-31 Oct	2015	Yacht Club Cagliari	Cagliari	Italy	Female	U15	-	47	16	5	
10	24-31 Oct	2015	Yacht Club Cagliari	Cagliari	Italy	Male	U17	111	-	24	5	
10	24-31 Oct	2015	Yacht Club Cagliari	Cagliari	Italy	Female	U17	-	50	18	4	
11	22-30 Oct	2016	Circolo Vela Torbole	Nago–Torbole, Lake Garda	Italy	Male	U15	135	-	24	3	
11	22-30 Oct	2016	Circolo Vela Torbole	Nago–Torbole, Lake Garda	Italy	Female	U15	-	64	15	3	
11	22-30 Oct	2016	Circolo Vela Torbole	Nago–Torbole, Lake Garda	Italy	Male	U17	133	-	27	6	
11	22-30 Oct	2016	Circolo Vela Torbole	Nago–Torbole, Lake Garda	Italy	Female	U17	-	82	26	5	
12+	15-20 Jul	2017	Ecole Nationale de Voile	Saint Pierre, Quiberon, Brittany	France	Male	+Rig		-			
12+	15-20 Jul	2017	Ecole Nationale de Voile	Saint Pierre, Quiberon, Brittany	France	Female	+Rig	-				
12	21-28 Oct	2017	Club Nautic Salou	Salou, Tarragona, Catalonia	Spain	Male	U15	96	-	21	3	
12	21-28 Oct	2017	Club Nautic Salou	Salou, Tarragona, Catalonia	Spain	Female	U15	-	47	14	3	
12	21-28 Oct	2017	Club Nautic Salou	Salou, Tarragona, Catalonia	Spain	Male	U17	130	-	23	3	
12	21-28 Oct	2017	Club Nautic Salou	Salou, Tarragona, Catalonia	Spain	Female	U17	-	61	19	3	
13		2018	Windsurfing Club Rietumkrasts	Liepāja	Latvia	Male	U15	72	-	23	3	
13		2018	Windsurfing Club Rietumkrasts	Liepāja	Latvia	Female	U15	-	39	12	3	
13		2018	Windsurfing Club Rietumkrasts	Liepāja	Latvia	Male	U17	81	-	23	3	
13		2018	Windsurfing Club Rietumkrasts	Liepāja	Latvia	Female	U17	-	100	30	6	
13		2018	Windsurfing Club Rietumkrasts	Liepāja	Latvia	Male	+ Rig	52	-	23	6	
13		2018	Windsurfing Club Rietumkrasts	Liepāja	Latvia	Female	+ Rig	-	36	20	5	
14	26 Oct - 2 Nov	2019	Club Náutico Puerto Sherry	Santa Maria, Andalucía	Spain	Male	U15	89	-	25	4	
14	26 Oct - 2 Nov	2019	Club Náutico Puerto Sherry	Santa Maria, Andalucía	Spain	Female	U15	-	57	18	3	
14	26 Oct - 2 Nov	2019	Club Náutico Puerto Sherry	Santa Maria, Andalucía	Spain	Male	U17	137	-	29	6	
14	26 Oct - 2 Nov	2019	Club Náutico Puerto Sherry	Santa Maria, Andalucía	Spain	Female	U17	-	85	22	5	
N/A	8-13 Sep	2020	Era Bodrum Sailing Club	Bodrum	Turkey	POSTPONED DUE TO COVID						
N/A	24-31 Oct	2020	Circolo Surf Torbole	Nago–Torbole, Lake Garda	Italy	POSTPONED DUE TO COVID						
15	23-30 Oct	2021	Circolo Surf Torbole	Nago–Torbole, Lake Garda	Italy	Open	U13	40	20	11	1	
15	23-30 Oct	2021	Circolo Surf Torbole	Nago–Torbole, Lake Garda	Italy	Male	U15	57	-	15	2	
15	23-30 Oct	2021	Circolo Surf Torbole	Nago–Torbole, Lake Garda	Italy	Female	U15	-	40	16	2	
15	23-30 Oct	2021	Circolo Surf Torbole	Nago–Torbole, Lake Garda	Italy	Male	U17	88	-	17	3	
15	23-30 Oct	2021	Circolo Surf Torbole	Nago–Torbole, Lake Garda	Italy	Female	U17	-	49	14	1	
15+		2021		Bodrum	Turkey	Male	Plus					
15+		2021		Bodrum	Turkey	Female	Plus					
16	29Oct -5Nov	2022	Sailing Centre of Cyprus Sports	Ayios Tychonas, Limassol	Cyprus	Open	U13	29	13	12	1	
16	29Oct -5Nov	2022	Sailing Centre of Cyprus Sports	Ayios Tychonas, Limassol	Cyprus	Male	U15	45	-	12	2	
16	29Oct -5Nov	2022	Sailing Centre of Cyprus Sports	Ayios Tychonas, Limassol	Cyprus	Female	U15	-	29	12	2	
16	29Oct -5Nov	2022	Sailing Centre of Cyprus Sports	Ayios Tychonas, Limassol	Cyprus	Male	U17	47	-	12	2	
16	29Oct -5Nov	2022	Sailing Centre of Cyprus Sports	Ayios Tychonas, Limassol	Cyprus	Female	U17	-	32	13	1	
16	29Oct -5Nov	2022	Sailing Centre of Cyprus Sports	Ayios Tychonas, Limassol	Cyprus	Male	+ Rig	25	-	8	2	
16	29Oct -5Nov	2022	Sailing Centre of Cyprus Sports	Ayios Tychonas, Limassol	Cyprus	Female	+ Rig	-	6	4	2	
17	29Jul -5Aug	2023	Comite Departemental Voile Morbihan	Saint-Pierre Quiberon	France	Open	U13	27	15	10	1	
17	29Jul -5Aug	2023	Comite Departemental Voile Morbihan	Saint-Pierre Quiberon	France	Male	U15	63	-	11	2	
17	29Jul -5Aug	2023	Comite Departemental Voile Morbihan	Saint-Pierre Quiberon	France	Female	U15	-	37	12	2	
17	29Jul -5Aug	2023	Comite Departemental Voile Morbihan	Saint-Pierre Quiberon	France	Male	U17	65	-	13	3	
17	29Jul -5Aug	2023	Comite Departemental Voile Morbihan	Saint-Pierre Quiberon	France	Female	U17	-	47	10	2	
17	29Jul -5Aug	2023	Comite Departemental Voile Morbihan	Saint-Pierre Quiberon	France	Male	+ Rig	45	-	9	2	
17	29Jul -5Aug	2023	Comite Departemental Voile Morbihan	Saint-Pierre Quiberon	France	Female	+ Rig	-	25	7	2	
18	20-28 Jul	2024	Spartacus Sailing Club	Lake Balaton, Balatonföldvár	Hungary	Open	U13	38	34	11	1	
18	20-28 Jul	2024	Spartacus Sailing Club	Lake Balaton, Balatonföldvár	Hungary	Male	U15	58	-	13	1	
18	20-28 Jul	2024	Spartacus Sailing Club	Lake Balaton, Balatonföldvár	Hungary	Female	U15	-	42	12	2	
18	20-28 Jul	2024	Spartacus Sailing Club	Lake Balaton, Balatonföldvár	Hungary	Male	U17	58	-	12	2	
18	20-28 Jul	2024	Spartacus Sailing Club	Lake Balaton, Balatonföldvár	Hungary	Female	U17	-	38	13	2	
18	20-28 Jul	2024	Spartacus Sailing Club	Lake Balaton, Balatonföldvár	Hungary	Male	+ Rig	38	-	11	3	
18	20-28 Jul	2024	Spartacus Sailing Club	Lake Balaton, Balatonföldvár	Hungary	Female	+ Rig	-	25	10	2	
19	16-23 Aug.	2025	Pwllheli Sailing Club	Pwllheli, Wales	United Kingdom	Open	U13	23	15	9	1	
19	16-23 Aug.	2025	Pwllheli Sailing Club	Pwllheli, Wales	United Kingdom	Male	U15	38	-	11	1	
19	16-23 Aug.	2025	Pwllheli Sailing Club	Pwllheli, Wales	United Kingdom	Female	U15	-	28	9	1	
19	16-23 Aug.	2025	Pwllheli Sailing Club	Pwllheli, Wales	United Kingdom	Male	U17	56	-	11	2	
19	16-23 Aug.	2025	Pwllheli Sailing Club	Pwllheli, Wales	United Kingdom	Female	U17	-	42	9	2	
19	16-23 Aug.	2025	Pwllheli Sailing Club	Pwllheli, Wales	United Kingdom	Male	+ Rig	34	-	10	2	
19	16-23 Aug.	2025	Pwllheli Sailing Club	Pwllheli, Wales	United Kingdom	Female	+ Rig	-	16	8	2	
20	5–9 Apr.	2026	Yenifoça Windsurfing & Sailing Sports Club	Foça, Turkey	Turkey	Open	U13	13	15	7	1	
20	5–9 Apr.	2026	Yenifoça Windsurfing & Sailing Sports Club	Foça, Turkey	Turkey	Male	U15	36	-	11	2	
20	5–9 Apr.	2026	Yenifoça Windsurfing & Sailing Sports Club	Foça, Turkey	Turkey	Female	U15	-	23	9	2	
20	5–9 Apr.	2026	Yenifoça Windsurfing & Sailing Sports Club	Foça, Turkey	Turkey	Male	U17	52	-	15	3	
20	5–9 Apr.	2026	Yenifoça Windsurfing & Sailing Sports Club	Foça, Turkey	Turkey	Female	U17	-	39	12	3	
20	5–9 Apr.	2026	Yenifoça Windsurfing & Sailing Sports Club	Foça, Turkey	Turkey	Male	+ Rig	56	-	10	3	
20	5–9 Apr.	2026	Yenifoça Windsurfing & Sailing Sports Club	Foça, Turkey	Turkey	Female	+ Rig	-	25	7	2	

== Medalists ==
=== Open Under 17 ===
Year	Gold	Silver	Bronze
2006	Guido Carli (ITA)	Alistair Masters (GBR)	Damien Roussel (FRA)

=== Open Under 15 ===
Year	Gold	Silver	Bronze
2006	Davide La Vela (ITA)	Adrian Jimenez Tur (ESP)	Guy Raymond (ISR)

=== Open Under 13 ===
Year	Gold	Silver	Bronze
2022	Moritz Schleicher (GER)	Jan Serafiński-Melsztyński (POL)	Gil Shtub (ISR)
2023	Alessandro Vigneri (ITA)	Francesco Casano (ITA)	Sarp Şarlı (TUR)
2024	Joshua Castro (ESP)	Biel Martorell (ESP)	Joan Servera (ESP)
2025	Antal Körtvélyesi (HUN)	Tuna Tekin (TUR)	Chiara Marras (ITA)

=== Male Under 13 ===
Year	Gold	Silver	Bronze
2022	Moritz Schleicher (GER)	Jan Serafiński-Melsztyński (POL)	Gil Shtub (ISR)
2023	Alessandro Vigneri (ITA)	Francesco Casano (ITA)	Sarp Şarlı (TUR)
2024	Joshua Castro (ESP)	Biel Martorell (ESP)	Joan Servera (ESP)
2025	Antal Körtvélyesi (HUN)	Tuna Tekin (TUR)	Alp Kaya Akdağ (TUR)
2026	Antal Körtvélyesi (HUN)	Benedek Schay (HUN)	Berk Pala (TUR)

=== Female Under 13 ===
Year	Gold	Silver	Bronze
2022	Michelle Urzykowski (POL)	Elettra Fulgenzi (ITA)	Oliwia Mroczkowska (POL)
2023	Parla Kabasakal (TUR)	Olivia Sánchez (ESP)	Nisa Ustundag (TUR)
2024	Iliana Panagi (GRE)	Greta Alesi (ITA)	Marta Clemente (ITA)
2025	Chiara Marras (ITA)	Kalina Wilandt (POL)	Nilda Evin (TUR)
2026	Nilda Evin (TUR)	Elisa Özer (TUR)	Antigoni Maniki (GRE)

=== Male Under 17 ===
Year	Gold	Silver	Bronze
2007	Alistair Masters (GBR)	Paweł Tarnowski (POL)	Mateusz Hoppe (POL)
2008	Paweł Tarnowski (POL)	Sam Sills (GBR)	Omer Sofer (ISR)
2009	Sam Sills (GBR)	Mateo Sanz (ESP)	Louis Giard (FRA)
2010	Gael Cousin (FRA)	Maxime Labat (FRA)	Cheng Chun Leung (HKG)
2011	Kieran Martin (GBR)	Adam Purcell (GBR)	Bell Baz (ISR)
2012	Antonio Bonet (ESP)	Tomer Blum (ISR)	Michele Cittadini (ITA)
2013	Ofek Elmeleh (ISR)	Rafeek Kikabhoy (HKG)	Mikita Tsirkun (BLR)
2014	Carlo Ciabatti (ITA)	Tom Monnet (FRA)	Yoav Cohen (ISR)
2015	Yoav Cohen (ISR)	Tom Arnoux (FRA)	Fernando Lamadrid (ESP)
2016	Tom Garandeau (FRA)	Leonidas Tsortanidis (GRE)	Fabien Pianazza (FRA)
2017	Roi Hillel (ISR)	Amit Gan (ISR)	Eyal Zror (ISR)
2018	Daniel Basik-Tashtash (ISR)	Nir Leshed (ISR)	Finn Hawkins (GBR)
2019	Tal Basik-Tashtash (ISR)	Adir Twill (ISR)	Ido Pomerantz (ISR)
2021	Federico Pilloni (ITA)	Meletios Kalpogiannakis (GRE)	Boris Shaw (GBR)
2022	Bruno Bárbara (ESP)	Arturo Araúz (ESP)	Shuhei Oyamada (JPN)
2023	Bruno Bárbara (ESP)	Minas Koutelas (GRE)	Karl Tamm (EST)
2024	Panagiotis Ioannou (GRE)	Agapitos Stamatoulakis (GRE)	Pavlos Alagkiozian (GRE)
2025	Sören Nguema (FRA)	Spiros Monastiriotis (GRE)	Georgios Kanellopoulos (GRE)
2026	Orestis-Nikolaos Palamidis (GRE)	Spiros Monastiriotis (GRE)	Foivos Koulalis (GRE)

=== Male Under 15 ===
Year	Gold	Silver	Bronze
2007	Sam Sills (GBR)	Marcin Urbanowicz (POL)	Adrián Jiménez (ESP)
2008	Martin Olmeta (FRA)	Jack Plummer (GBR)	Kieran Martin (GBR)
2009	Kieran Martin (GBR)	Albert Chaillot (FRA)	Adam Purcell (GBR)
2010	Andrey Zagaynov (RUS)	Tomer Blum (ISR)	Michele Cittadini (ITA)
2011	Mattia Onali (ITA)	Artem Javadav (BLR)	Mikita Tsirkun (BLR)
2012	Tom Monnet (FRA)	Antonino Cangemi (ITA)	Francisco Saubidet (ARG)
2013	Yoav Cohen (ISR)	Tom Monnet (FRA)	Tom Arnoux (FRA)
2014	Tom Arnoux (FRA)	Lior Kamil (ISR)	Itai Kafri (ISR)
2015	Leonidas Tsortanidis (GRE)	Yun Pouliquen (FRA)	Fabien Pianazza (FRA)
2016	Mathis Ghio (FRA)	Eyal Zror (ISR)	Finn Hawkins (GBR)
2017	Daniel Basik-Tashtash (ISR)	Jules Chantrel (FRA)	Gaspard Carfantan (FRA)
2018	Alessandro Graciotti (ITA)	Tal Basik-Tashtash (ISR)	Ram Zerach (ISR)
2019	Daniel Halperin (ISR)	Federico Pilloni (ITA)	Victor Gaubert (FRA)
2021	Itamar Levi (ISR)	Dmitrii Nesterenko (RUS)	Rocco Sotomayor (ITA)
2022	Omer Shemesh (ISR)	Adam Koussevitzky (ISR)	Pierluigi Caproni (ITA)
2023	Panagiotis Ioannou (GRE)	Evangelos Giannakopoulos (GRE)	Milo Shaw (GBR)
2024	Evangelos Kyriazakos (GRE)	Georgios Kanellopoulos (GRE)	Spiros Monastiriotis (GRE)
2025	Joshua Castro (ESP)	Foivos Koulalis (GRE)	Evangelos Kyriazakos (GRE)
2026	Joshua Castro (ESP)	Simon Pirastu (FRA)	Marcos Dasilva (ESP)

=== Female Under 17 ===
Year	Gold	Silver	Bronze
2007	Hélène Noesmoen (FRA)	Leonore Bosch (FRA)	Sybille Bosch (FRA)
2008	Hélène Noesmoen (FRA)	Izzy Hamilton (GBR)	Ofir Halevy (ISR)
2009	Veronica Fanciulli (ITA)	Clidane Humeau (FRA)	Hadas Zaga (ISR)
2010	Naomi Cohen (ISR)	Atar Yuval (ISR)	Veronica Fanciulli (ITA)
2011	Saskia Sills (GBR)	Marion Lepert (USA)	Imogen Sills (GBR)
2012	Marta Maggetti (ITA)	Hadar Heller (ISR)	Elena Vacca (ITA)
2013	Stefaniya Elfutina (RUS)	Ching Ma Kwan (HKG)	Emma Wilson (GBR)
2014	Lucie Pianazza (FRA)	Katy Spychakov (ISR)	Mariam Sekhposyan (RUS)
2015	Katy Spychakov (ISR)	Giorgia Speciale (ITA)	Enrica Schirru (ITA)
2016	Giorgia Speciale (ITA)	Enrica Schirru (ITA)	Aikaterini Divari (GRE)
2017	Linoy Geva (ISR)	Maya Ashkenazi (ISR)	Enora Tanne (FRA)
2018	Naama Greenberg (ISR)	Daniela Peleg (ISR)	Sharon Kantor (ISR)
2019	Jade Bruche (FRA)	Mika Kafri (ISR)	Naiara Fernández (ESP)
2021	Nela Sadílková (CZE)	Kristýna Chalupníková (CZE)	Bárbara Winau (ESP)
2022	Azul Sánchez (ESP)	Nicol Říčanová (CZE)	Linda Falkiewicz (POL)
2023	Defne Başdağ (TUR)	Danai Anagnostou (GRE)	Teresa Medde (ITA)
2024	Danai Anagnostou (GRE)	Martina Bárbara (ESP)	Defne Eğrilmez (TUR)
2025	Lindia Pousa (ESP)	Laura Grasso (ITA)	Martina Bárbara (ESP)
2026	Johanna Lukk (EST)	Kyriaki Zerva (GRE)	Olivia Sánchez (ESP)

=== Female Under 15 ===
Year	Gold	Silver	Bronze
2007	Caterina Farchione (ITA)	Shani Rottenberg (ISR)	Lara Lagoa (ESP)
2008	Catherine Fogli (ITA)	Veronica Fanciulli (ITA)	Lara Lagoa (ESP)
2009	Saskia Sills (GBR)	Imogen Sills (GBR)	Marta Maggetti (ITA)
2010	Marta Maggetti (ITA)	Emma Labourne (GBR)	Hadar Heller (ISR)
2011	Emma Wilson (GBR)	Shai Blank (ISR)	Emily Hall (GBR)
2012	Lucine Bossard (ITA)	Giorgia Speciale (ITA)	Giulia Alagna (ITA)
2013	Giorgia Speciale (ITA)	Katy Spychakov (ISR)	Océane Mountaut (FRA)
2014	Giorgia Speciale (ITA)	Shira Benbenisti (ISR)	Natalia Arapoglou (GRE)
2015	Heloise Macquaert (FRA)	Enora Tanne (FRA)	Dana Bekmuratova (RUS)
2016	Mak Cheuk Wing (HKG)	Mathilde Garandeau (FRA)	Linoy Geva (ISR)
2017	Ella Benbenisti (ISR)	Mak Cheuk-Wing (HKG)	Yana Reznikova (RUS)
2018	Mika Kafri (ISR)	Amit Segev (ISR)	Michal Slavin (ISR)
2019	Tamar Steinberg (ISR)	Danielle Ziv (ISR)	Anna Igielska (POL)
2021	Maria Rudowicz (POL)	Azul Sánchez (ESP)	Anna Polettini (ITA)
2022	Naama Palatnik (ISR)	Medea Falcioni (ITA)	Yael Hadash (ISR)
2023	Gaia Bonezzi (ITA)	Nehir Çakmak (TUR)	Sophie Clark (GBR)
2024	Olivia Sánchez (ESP)	Lindia Pousa (ESP)	Mia Berazategui (ESP)
2025	Olivia Sánchez (ESP)	Iliana Panagi (GRE)	Marta Ieva Dāle (LAT)
2026	Cristina Iglesias (ESP)	Chiara Marras (ITA)	Derin Toker (TUR)

=== +Plus Rig - Male ===
Year	Gold	Silver	Bronze
2023	Petros Kontarinis (GRE)	Alexandros Kokkinakis (GRE)	Arthis Espagnon (FRA)
2024	Yugo Saito (JPN)	Minas Koutelas (GRE)	Daiki Mishiba (JPN)
2025	Daiki Mishiba (JPN)	Takehito Katayama (JPN)	Navin Singsart (THA)
2026	Julien Omey (BEL)	Panagiotis Ioannou (GRE)	Orestis Valiadis (GRE)

=== +Plus Rig - Female ===
Year	Gold	Silver	Bronze
2023	Angelina Medde (ITA)	Liisbeth Orav (EST)	Marion Lextray (ESP)
2024	Teresa Medde (ITA)	Nefeli Anagnostou (GRE)	Kristyna Chalupnikova (CZE)
2025	Teresa Medde (ITA)	Kokoro Hirose (JPN)	Alejandra López-Amado (ESP)
2026	Teresa Medde (ITA)	Defne Eğrilmez (TUR)	Martina Barbara (ESP)

== Sub Worlds ==
=== Male Under 13 5.0m2 ===
Year	Gold	Silver	Bronze
2023	Hugo Can Godfroid (BEL)	Dawson Rogers (GBR)	Antal Körtvélyesi (HUN)
2024	Antal Körtvélyesi (HUN)	Jakub Kazmierczak (POL)	Alp Kaya Akdağ (TUR)
2025	Bozok Balcı (TUR)	Poyraz Yetimler (TUR)	Maksymilian Wilandt (POL)
2026	Benedek Schay (HUN)	Berk Pala (TUR)	Bozok Balcı (TUR)

=== Female Under 13 5.0m2 ===
Year	Gold	Silver	Bronze
2023	Ruby Webb (GBR)	Ada Oktem (TUR)	Nil Erdamar (TUR)
2024	Kalina Wilandt (POL)	Jessica Roman Inamahoro (HUN)	Adéla Polívková (CZE)
2025	Nilda Evin (TUR)	Jessica Roman Inamahoro (HUN)	Elisa Özer (TUR)
2026	Nilda Evin (TUR)	Alya Atik (TUR)	Alya Güneş Canan (TUR)
