= Sailing at the 2024 Summer Olympics – Women's iQFoil =

Women's iQFoil at the Games of the XXXIII Olympiad
- Venues: Marseille Marina
- Dates: 29 July–3 August 2024
- Competitors: 24 from 24 nations

Medalists
| 1st place, gold medalist(s) | | Marta Maggetti | Italy |
| 2nd place, silver medalist(s) | | Sharon Kantor | Israel |
| 3rd place, bronze medalist(s) | | Emma Wilson | Great Britain |

The women's iQFoil competition at the 2024 Summer Olympics was the women's windsurfer event and was held in Marseille, France, from 29 July to 2 August 2024. It was the first women's windsurfing competition at the Olympics to use the iQFoil board, which replaced the RS:X boards that had been used in the previous four Olympics.

24 sailors from 24 nations competed in 14 opening series races. The board finishing first was eligible to compete directly in the final, while the second and third-ranked boats appeared in the semi-finals. Boards ranked fourth to 10th featured in the quarter-finals, from which the top two made it to the semi-finals. The top two boards in the semi-finals joined the first-ranked team from the opening series in the final race.

A board's final rank was relative to its finishing place in the race it was eliminated. For instance, boards in the final were ranked ahead of the semi-final participants, boards in the quarter-finals were ranked ahead of the opening series participants.

== Schedule ==
| Mon 29 Jul | Tue 30 Jul | Wed 31 Jul | Thu 1 Aug | Fri 2 Aug | Sat 3 Aug |
|---|---|---|---|---|---|
| Race 1 Race 2 | Race 3 Race 4 Race 5 Race 6 Race 7 | Race 8 Race 9 Race 10; Race 11 | Race 12; Race 13; Race 14 | ~~Quarterfinal~~; ~~Semifinal~~; ~~Final~~; Postponed | Quarterfinal; Semifinal; Final |

== Results ==
=== Medal series ===
Final results:

| Rank | Helmsman | Nation | Quarterfinal | Semifinal | Medal Race |
|---|---|---|---|---|---|
| 1st place, gold medalist(s) | Marta Maggetti | Italy | Bye | 2 | 1 |
| 2nd place, silver medalist(s) | Sharon Kantor | Israel | Bye | 1 | 2 |
| 3rd place, bronze medalist(s) | Emma Wilson | Great Britain | Bye | | 3.5; DPI |
| 4 | María Belén Bazo | Peru | 2 | 3 | |
| 5 | Yan Zheng | China | 1 | 4 | |
| 6 | Theresa Marie Steinlein | Germany | 3 | | |
| 7 | Hélène Noesmoen | France | 4 | | |
| 8 | Maja Dziarnowska | Poland | 5 | | |
| 9 | Kateřina Švíková | Czech Republic | 6 | | |
| 10 | Veerle Ten Have | New Zealand | 7 | | |

=== Preliminary races ===
Official results:

Results of individual races
| Pos | Helmsman | Country | I | II | III | IV | V | VI | VII | VIII | IX | X | XI | XII | XIII | XIV | Tot | Pts |
|---|---|---|---|---|---|---|---|---|---|---|---|---|---|---|---|---|---|---|
| 1 | Emma Wilson | Great Britain | 1 | 2 | 1 | 2 | 17^{†} | 1 | 1 | 1 | 1 | 3^{†} | 1 | 1 | 3 | 3 | 38 | 18 |
| 2 | Sharon Kantor | Israel | 25^{†} DSQ | 6 | 10 | 1 | 1 | 3 | 4 | 2 | 15^{†} | 1 | 2 | 6 | 2 | 11 | 89 | 49 |
| 3 | Marta Maggetti | Italy | 5 | 3 | 4 | 20^{†} | 11 | 4 | 3 | 8 | 4 | 4 | 4 | 15^{†} | 11 | 9 | 105 | 70 |
| 4 | Hélène Noesmoen | France | 12 | 19 | 2 | 9 | 5 | 11 | 6 | 4 | 2 | 25^{†} DSQ | 6 | 10 | 12 | 25^{†} BFD | 148 | 98 |
| 5 | Kateřina Švíková | Czech Republic | 8 | 8 | 18^{†} | 10 | 6 | 7 | 13 | 3 | 18 | 8 | 15 | 5 | 19^{†} | 4 | 138 | 101 |
| 6 | Maja Dziarnowska | Poland | 7 | 10 | 23^{†} | 13 | 8 | 6 | 11 | 14 | 12 | 25^{†} DSQ | 8 | 4 | 7 | 2 | 150 | 102 |
| 7 | María Belén Bazo | Peru | 4 | 4 | 8 | 12 | 7 | 12 | 8 | 21^{†} | 11 | 6 | 5 | 18.5; DPI | 7.5; DPI | 20.5^{†} DPI | 144.5 | 103 |
| 8 | Theresa Marie Steinlein | Germany | 3 | 11 | 12 | 16^{†} | 16 | 13 | 2 | 5 | 5 | 13 | 12 | 25^{†} UFD | 9 | 7 | 149 | 108 |
| 9 | Veerle Ten Have | New Zealand | 25^{†} DSQ | 15 | 16 | 8 | 18^{†} | 5 | 12 | 11 | 3 | 5 | 3 | 2 | 16 | 13 | 152 | 109 |
| 10 | Yan Zheng | China | 2 | 20^{†} | 11 | 25^{†} DSQ | 3 | 2 | 17 | 17 | 18 | 11 | 16 | 7 | 1 | 5 | 155 | 110 |
| 11 | Mina Mobekk | Norway | 13 | 16 | 9 | 18^{†} | 2 | 15 | 7 | 18 | 9 | 7 | 7 | 9 | 8 | 21^{†} | 159 | 120 |
| 12 | Palma Čargo | Croatia | 17 | 14 | 3 | 4 | 13 | 8 | 15 | 9 | 19 | 9 | 9 | 25^{†} UFD | 25^{†} DNF | 1 | 171 | 121 |
| 13 | Mariana Aguilar | Mexico | 15 | 7 | 14 | 25^{†} BFD | 19^{†} | 18 | 5 | 15 | 16 | 14 | 10 | 3 | 13 | 8 | 182 | 138 |
| 14 | Ma Kwan Ching | Hong Kong | 6 | 5 | 15 | 5 | 10 | 17 | 18 | 7 | 21^{†} | 17 | 14 | 25^{†} UFD | 15 | 10 | 185 | 139 |
| 15 | Pilar Lamadrid | Spain | 25^{†} DSQ | 1 | 24^{†} | 14 | 12 | 14 | 20 | 19 | 7 | 2 | 11 | 13 | 4 | 23 | 189 | 140 |
| 16 | Sara Wennekes | Netherlands | 10.3; DPI | 12 | 21^{†} | 15 | 4 | 10 | 19 | 16 | 8 | 15 | 20^{†} | 12 | 17 | 16 | 195.3 | 154.3 |
| 17 | Ingrid Puusta | Estonia | 25^{†} BFD | 9 | 13 | 11 | 15 | 9 | 10 | 13 | 17 | 18 | 22^{†} | 18 | 14 | 15 | 209 | 162 |
| 18 | Merve Vatan | Turkey | 20 | 23 | 5 | 3 | 14 | 20 | 25^{†} DNS | 12 | 13 | 10 | 19 | 14 | 25^{†} DNF | 12 | 215 | 165 |
| 19 | Natasa Lappa | Cyprus | 16 | 25^{†} BFD | 7 | 17 | 20 | 21 | 16 | 10 | 6 | 16 | 13 | 25^{†} UFD | 6 | 22 | 220 | 170 |
| 20 | Johanna Hjertberg | Sweden | 18 | 17 | 6 | 19 | 23 | 24^{†} | 25^{†} DNS | 6 | 10 | 20 | 17 | 17 | 18 | 6 | 226 | 177 |
| 21 | Lina Eržen | Slovenia | 14 | 13 | 17 | 7 | 9 | 19 | 9 | 23 | 24^{†} | 19 | 23 | 25^{†} UFD | 10 | 17 | 229 | 180 |
| 22 | Dominique Stater | United States | 11 | 22^{†} | 20 | 6 | 21 | 16 | 25^{†} DNF | 22 | 20 | 12 | 18 | 8 | 20 | 14 | 235 | 188 |
| 23 | Lorena Abicht | Austria | 10 | 18 | 22 | 25^{†} BFD | 22 | 23 | 25^{†} DNF | 24 | 22 | 22 | 21 | 11 | 25; DNF | 20 | 290 | 240 |
| 24 | Chiara Ferretti | Argentina | 19 | 21 | 19 | 21 | 24^{†} | 22 | 14 | 20 | 23 | 21 | 24 | 19 | 25^{†} DNF | 19 | 291 | 242 |

Scoring system: low-point system;
Legend: – Qualified for medal race(s); BFD – Black flag disqualification; DNF – Did not finish; DNS – Did not start; DPI – Discretionary penalty imposed; OCS – On the course side of the starting line; RDG – Redress given; UFD – "U" flag disqualification; † – Discarded race not counted in the overall result;
