= IQFoil World Championships =

Sailing competition

iQFoil World Championships
- First held: 2021
- Classes: iQFoil

The iQFoil World Championships is an international sailing competition organised by the host club on behalf of the class association and recognised by World Sailing and held since 2021.

== Seniors ==
=== Male ===
| Event | Location | Gold | Silver | Bronze |
|---|---|---|---|---|
| 2021 | Silvaplana, Switzerland | (France) Nicolas Goyard | (United Kingdom) Matthew Barton | (Netherlands) Luuc van Opzeeland |
| 2022 | Brest, France | (Germany) Sebastian Kördel | (Netherlands) Luuc van Opzeeland | (Netherlands) Huig-Jan Tak |
| 2023 | The Hague, Netherlands | (Netherlands) Luuc van Opzeeland | (Germany) Sebastian Kördel | (Italy) Nicolò Renna |
| 2024 | Lanzarote, Spain | (Italy) Nicolò Renna | (Poland) Paweł Tarnowski | (Netherlands) Luuc van Opzeeland |
| 2025 | Aarhus, Denmark | (United Kingdom) Andy Brown | (France) Tom Arnoux | (Italy) Nicolò Renna |
| 2026 | (United Kingdom) Weymouth, Great Britain | (Netherlands) Luuc van Opzeeland | (United States) Noah Lyons | (Denmark) Johan Søe |

=== Female ===
| Event | Location | Gold | Silver | Bronze | Ref. |
|---|---|---|---|---|---|
| 2021 | Silvaplana, Switzerland | (France) Hélène Noesmoen | (United Kingdom) Islay Watson | (United Kingdom) Saskia Sills | |
| 2022 | Brest, France | (Italy) Marta Maggetti | (Israel) Daniela Peleg | (Israel) Maya Morris | |
| 2023 | The Hague, Netherlands | Shahar Tibi (ISR) | Katy Spychakov (ISR) | Emma Wilson (GBR) | |
| 2024 | Lanzarote, Spain | (Israel) Sharon Kantor | (United Kingdom) Emma Wilson | (Israel) Katy Spychakov | |
| 2025 | Aarhus, Denmark | (United Kingdom) Emma Wilson | (Israel) Tamar Steinberg | (Germany) Theresa Steinlein | |
| 2026 | (United Kingdom) Weymouth, Great Britain | Tamar Steinberg (ISR) | Sharon Kantor (ISR) | Stella Bilger (AUS) | |

== Under 21 ==
=== Men ===
| Event | Location | Gold | Silver | Bronze |
|---|---|---|---|---|
| 2021 | Silvaplana, Switzerland | (United Kingdom) Finn Hawkins | (Netherlands) Max Castelein | (France) Louis Pignolet |
| 2022 | Brest, France | (Netherlands) Max Castelein | (Denmark) Johan Søe | (France) Gaspard Carfantan |

=== Women ===
| Event | Location | Gold | Silver | Bronze |
|---|---|---|---|---|
| 2021 | Silvaplana, Switzerland | (Israel) Shachar Reshef | (Norway) Helle Oppedal | (Israel) Sharon Kantor |
| 2022 | Brest, France | (Israel) Daniela Peleg | (Israel) Sharon Kantor | (Germany) Theresa Steinlein |
