= Aloha World Championships =

Windsurfing world championships in Aloha class

The Aloha World Championships was a sailing event organized by the host club on behalf of the International Aloha Class Association (part of International Windsurfer Association) and recognized by World Sailing, the sports IOC recognized governing body. Aloha Windsurfer was a youth class in the late 1990s and early 2000s and was superseded by the Techno 293 and the Techno 293 World Championships.

== Events ==
Event			Host			Category	Participation				Ref.
Ed.	Dates	Year	Host club	Location	Country	Category			Nat.	Cont	Ref.
1998		1998		La Tranche Sur Mer	France	Male		-			
1998		1998		La Tranche Sur Mer	France	Female	-				
1999		1999		Martigues	France	Male		-			
1999		1999		Martigues	France	Female	-				
1999		1999		Martigues	France	Open Mini					
2000		2000		Mar Menor	Spain	Male		-			
2000		2000		Mar Menor	Spain	Female	-				
2000		2000		Mar Menor	Spain	Open Mini					
2001		2001		Ostia (Rome)	Italy	Male	61	-			
2001		2001		Ostia (Rome)	Italy	Female	-	21			
2001		2001		Ostia (Rome)	Italy	Open Mini					
2002		2002		Largs	United Kingdom	Male	35	-		1	
2002		2002		Largs	United Kingdom	Female	-	17		1	
2002		2002		Largs	United Kingdom	Open Mini	21	6		1	
2003	12 Dec 02; 6 Jan	2003		Merida, Yucatan	Mexico	Male		-			
2003	12 Dec 02; 6 Jan	2003		Merida, Yucatan	Mexico	Female	-	12	6	3	
2003	12 Dec 02; 6 Jan	2003		Merida, Yucatan	Mexico	Male Mini					
2003	12 Dec 02; 6 Jan	2003		Merida, Yucatan	Mexico	Female Mini	Sub Worlds of Junior				

== Medalists Open/Male ==
Year	Category	Gold	Silver	Bronze	Ref.
1998	Boys	Adrien Gaillard (FRA)	Joeri Van Dijk (NED)	Alex Habner (ISR)	
1998	Girls	Agata Brygolea (POL)	Perrine Messiale (FRA)	Dana Solav (ISR)	
1999	Boys	Joeri Van Dijk (NED)	Sebastien Leterme (FRA)	Mickeal Wolf (FRA)	
1999	Girls	Dana Solav (ISR)	Katherine Potter (GBR)	ony Shaked (ISR)	
1999	Minim Boy	Michal Kolka (POL)	Oded Fayans (ISR)	Andrea Ferin (ITA)	
2000	Boys	Maksimilian Wojcik (POL)	Oded Fayans (ISR)	Tomasj Frydrychowicz (POL)	
2000	Girls	Zofhia Klepacka (POL)	Charline Picon (FRA)	Joanna Oborska (POL)	
2000	Minim Boy	Juan Manuel Moreno (ESP)	Shahar Tzubari (ISR)	Richard Potter (GBR)	
2001	Boys	Tomasj Frydrychowicz (POL)	Frederico Esposito (ITA)	Shahar Tzubari (ISR)	
2001	Girls	Karolina Kroplewska (POL)	Ania Losiewicz (POL)	Flavia Tartaglini (ITA)	
2002	Boys	Enrico Collura (ITA)	Frederico ESPOSITO (ITA)	Guénolé BERNARD (FRA)	
2002	Girls	Anne Sophie Le Page (FRA)	Marie Noesmoen (FRA)	Pauline Le Guiban (FRA)	
2002	Minim	Riccardo Belli dell'Isla (ITA)	Lukaz GRODZICKI (POL)	Kwok Po Ma (HKG)	
2003	Boys	Riccardo Belli dell'Isla (ITA)	Lukaz Grodzicki (POL)	Kwok Po Ma (HKG)	
2003	Girls	Laura Linares (ITA)	Marie Noesmoen (FRA)	Arielle Guyader (FRA)	
2003	Minim Boys	Patricio Gasque (MEX)	Colin Pouderoux (FRA)	Richard Hamilton (GBR)	
2003	Minim Girls	Insufficient entries			

== Other Links ==
- Techno 293 World Championships
