= IQFoil European Championships =

The iQFoil European Championships are international sailing regattas in the iQFoil class.

== Editions ==
Year	City	Country	Dates	Events	Athletes	Nations	Notes
2020	Silvaplana	Switzerland	21–26 August		136	21	
2021	Marseille	France	22–28 October		209	33	
2022	Torbole	Italy	15–22 May		249	40	
2023	Patras	Greece	9–14 May		203	37	
2024	Cagliari	Italy	6–11 October	2	115	37	
2025	Palermo	Italy	22–29 November		142	37	
2026	Portimão	Portugal	18–23 May		192	41	

== Medalists ==
=== Men ===
Year	Location	Gold	Silver	Bronze
2020	Silvaplana	Kiran Badloe (NED)	Sebastian Kördel (GER)	Nicolas Goyard (FRA)
2021	Marseille	Nicolas Goyard (FRA)	Huig-Jan Tak (NED)	Mateus Isaac (BRA)
2022	Torbole	Nicolas Goyard (FRA)	Nicolò Renna (ITA)	Luuc van Opzeeland (NED)
2023	Patras	Nicolò Renna (ITA)	Sebastian Kördel (GER)	Kiran Badloe (NED)
2024	Cagliari	Paweł Tarnowski (POL)	Andy Brown (GBR)	Matthew Barton (GBR)
2025	Sferracavallo	Luuc van Opzeeland (NED)	Nicolas Goyard (FRA)	Finn Hawkins (GBR)
2026	Portimão	Luuc van Opzeeland (NED)	Johan Søe (DEN)	Federico Alan Pilloni (ITA)

=== Women ===
Year	Location	Gold	Silver	Bronze
2020	Silvaplana	Hélène Noesmoen (FRA)	Islay Watson (GBR)	Lilian de Geus (NED)
2021	Marseille	Hélène Noesmoen (FRA)	Islay Watson (GBR)	Shachar Reshef (ISR)
2022	Torbole	Hélène Noesmoen (FRA)	Emma Wilson (GBR)	Maja Dziarnowska (POL)
2023	Patras	Mina Mobekk (NOR)	Sharon Kantor (ISR)	Emma Wilson (GBR)
2024	Cagliari	Daniela Peleg (ISR)	Maya Gysler (NOR)	Anastasiya Valkevich (POL)
2025	Sferracavallo	Daniela Peleg (ISR)	Emma Wilson (GBR)	Maya Gysler (NOR)
2026	Portimão	Tamar Steinberg (ISR)	Shahar Tibi (ISR)	Pilar Lamadrid (ESP)

== Medals (2020–2026) ==
Rank	Nation	Gold	Silver	Bronze	Total
1	France (FRA)	5	1	1	7
2	Israel (ISR)	3	2	1	6
3	Netherlands (NED)	3	1	3	7
4	Italy (ITA)	1	1	1	3
4	Norway (NOR)	1	1	1	3
6	Poland (POL)	1	0	2	3
7	Great Britain (GBR)	0	5	3	8
8	Germany (GER)	0	2	0	2
9	Denmark (DEN)	0	1	0	1
10	Spain (ESP)	0	0	1	1
Totals (10 entries)		14	14	13	41
