= Sailing at the 2020 Summer Olympics – Women's RS:X =

Women's RS:X at the Games of the XXXII Olympiad
- Line drawing of the RS:X
- Venues: Enoshima Yacht Harbor
- Dates: 25 July – 31 July 2021
- Competitors: 27 from 27 nations

Medalists
1st place, gold medalist(s)		Lu Yunxiu	China
2nd place, silver medalist(s)		Charline Picon	France
3rd place, bronze medalist(s)		Emma Wilson	Great Britain

The women's RS:X was a sailing event at the 2020 Summer Olympics that took place between 25 and 31 July at Enoshima Yacht Harbor. Thirteen races (the last one a medal race) are scheduled.

Medals were presented by IOC Member for Israel, Mr Alex Gilady and World Sailing President Li Quanhai.

== Schedule ==
Sun 25 Jul	Mon 26 Jul	Tue 27 Jul	Wed 28 Jul	Thu 29 Jul	Fri 30 Jul	Sat 31 Jul
Race 1 Race 2 Race 3	Race 4 Race 5 Race 6	Rest day	Race 7 Race 8 Race 9	Race 10; Race 11; Race 12	Rest day	Medal race

== Results ==
Results of individual races
Pos	Helmsman	Country	I	II	III	IV	V	VI	VII	VIII	IX	X	XI	XII	MR	Tot	Pts
1st place, gold medalist(s)	Lu Yunxiu	China	2	9	25^{†}	2	2	1	4	2	1	2	3	2	6	61	36
2nd place, silver medalist(s)	Charline Picon	France	1	6	2	9^{†}	1	4	2	3	6	3	2	6	2	47	38
3rd place, bronze medalist(s)	Emma Wilson	Great Britain	5	2	6	1	4	2	1	1	28^{†} (UFD)	6	1	5	4	66	38
4	Marta Maggetti	Italy	6	3	3	13^{†}	6	7	5	6	3	5	6	8	8	79	66
5	Lilian de Geus	Netherlands	8	11^{†}	1	8	3	11	3	4	4	9	5	4	12	83	72
6	Katy Spychakov	Israel	3	5	9	7	10	3	13^{†}	13	9	1	4	1	20	98	85
7	Lærke Buhl-Hansen	Denmark	9^{†}	4	8	4	9	8	6	5	5	8	9	9	18	102	93
8	Hayley Chan	Hong Kong	12	8	13	5	7	6	8	14^{†}	7	4	8	3	14	109	95
9	Zofia Noceti Klepacka	Poland	4	1	14	16^{†}	16	9	7	8	2	11	7	7	10	112	96
10	Patrícia Freitas	Brazil	13	14	4	11	12	10	9	7	19^{†}	10	15	12	16	152	133
11	Blanca Manchón	Spain	7	7	12	14	13	16^{†}	14	9	14	14	10	10		140	124
12	Yuki Sunaga	Japan	17	24^{†}	11	3	5	12	11	22	10	7	14	17		153	129
13	María Belén Bazo	Peru	14	13	17^{†}	15	8	5	12	12	11	15	11	14		147	130
14	Tuuli Petäjä-Sirén	Finland	11	15	18	6	11	13	10	11	12	22^{†}	12	11		152	130
15	Farrah Hall	United States	21^{†}	21	7	12	18	18	16	15	8	16	16	16		184	163
16	Ingrid Puusta	Estonia	15	12	16	10	14	17	17	17	17	18^{†}	13	18		184	166
17	Siripon Kaewduang-ngam	Thailand	10	20	10	17	19	14	21^{†}	16	15	17	18	15		192	171
18	Demita Vega	Mexico	26	16	15	22	22	19	19	10	20	13	28^{†} (DNF)	13		223	195
19	Aikaterini Divari	Greece	19	19	19	20	20	23^{†}	15	18	13	19	19	23		227	204
20	María Celia Tejerina	Argentina	20	18	21	18	15	21	18	21	16	24^{†}	17	22		231	207
21	Natasa Lappa	Cyprus	24	25	26^{†}	19	17	22	20	20	18	12	22	19		244	218
22	Anna Khvorikova	ROC	18	10	5	26^{†}	23	24	25	25	25	20	23	26		250	224
23	Nikola Girke	Canada	25^{†}	23	22	24	21	20	23	23	22	25	21	20		269	244
24	Dilara Uralp	Turkey	16	22	23	23	24	25^{†}	22	24	21	21	25	24		270	245
25	Sára Cholnoky	Hungary	27^{†}	27	27	21	25	15	24	19	24	23	20	21		273	246
26	Amanda Ng	Singapore	22	17	20	25	26	27^{†}	26	26	23	26	24	25		287	260
27	Nadjet Berrichi	Algeria	23	26	24	28^{†} (DNF)	28 (DNF)	26	27	27	28 (DNF)	27	26	27		317	289

Legend: – Qualified for medal race(s); DNF – Did not finish; DPI – Discretionary penalty imposed; RDG – Redress given; UFD – "U" flag disqualification; † – Discarded race not counted in the overall result;
