= 2022 Youth Sailing World Championships =

Event title
- Edition: 51st

Event details
- Venue: The Hague, Netherlands
- Dates: 8 - 15 July 2022

The 2022 Youth Sailing World Championships took place in The Hague, the Netherlands from 8 to 15 July. It was the 51st edition of the Youth Sailing World Championships.

== Competition format ==
=== Events and equipment ===
Event	Equipment
Boy's dinghy (single hander)	ILCA 6
Boy's skiff	29er
Boy's windsurfer	iQFOiL
Boy's kitesurfer	Formula Kite
Girl's dinghy (single hander)	ILCA 6
Girl's dinghy (double hander)	420
Girl's skiff	29er
Girl's windsurfer	iQFOiL
Girl's kitesurfer	Formula Kite
Male/Mixed dinghy (double hander) (Note: Male/mixed. Male pairings allowed, mixed parings allowed, female pairings not allowed)	420
Mixed Multihull	Nacra 15

== Summary ==
=== Medal table ===
* Host nation (Netherlands)

Rank	Nation	Gold	Silver	Bronze	Total
1	Argentina	2	0	0	2
1	Ireland	2	0	0	2
3	Spain	1	1	1	3
4	Great Britain	1	1	0	2
4	Israel	1	1	0	2
6	Switzerland	1	0	0	1
6	United States	1	0	0	1
8	France	0	2	1	3
9	Germany	0	1	1	2
9	Netherlands*	0	1	1	2
9	Turkey	0	1	1	2
12	Bermuda	0	1	0	1
13	Croatia	0	0	1	1
13	Italy	0	0	1	1
13	Japan	0	0	1	1
13	New Zealand	0	0	1	1
Totals (16 entries)		9	9	9	27

=== Event medalists ===
==== Men's events ====
Event	First	Second	Third
ILCA 6	Rocco Wright; Ireland	Sebastian Kempe; Bermuda	Ole Schweckendiek; Germany
29er	Maximo Videla; Tadeo Funes de Rioja; Argentina	Santiago Sesto Cosby; Leo Wilkinson; Great Britain	George Lee Rush; Seb Menzies; New Zealand
iQFOiL	Charlie Dixon; Great Britain	Hidde van der Meer; Netherlands	Nacho Baltasar Summers; Spain
Formula Kite	Maximilian Maeder; Singapore	Riccardo Pianosi; Italy	Jakub Jurkowski; Poland

==== Women's events ====
Event	First	Second	Third
ILCA 6	Eve McMahon; Ireland	Evie Saunders; Australia	Roos Wind; Netherlands
420	Maria Perello Mora; Marta Cardona Alcantara; Spain	Amelie Wehrle; Amelie Rinn; Germany	Camilla Michelini; Margherita Bonifaccio; Italy
29er	Amparo Stupenengo Pefaur; Julia Pantin; Argentina	Lucie Gout; Fleur Babin; France	Manase Ichihashi; Rinko Goto; Japan
iQFOiL	Tamar Steinberg; Israel	Merve Vatan; Turkey	Lina Erzen; Slovenia
Formula Kite	Julia Damasiewicz; Poland	Héloïse Pégourié; France	Derİn Atakan; Turkey

==== Mixed events ====
Event	First	Second	Third
Nacra 15	Axel Grandjean; Noémie Fehlmann; Switzerland	Nora Garcia de la Casa; Daniel Garcia de la Casa; Spain	Tiphaine Rideau; Titouan Moreau; France
420 (Note: Male/mixed. Male pairings allowed, mixed parings allowed, female pairings not allowed)	Freddie Parkin; Asher Beck; United States	Roi Levy; Ariel Gal; Israel	Ema Samarzija; Leon Scheidl; Croatia
