= Merve Vatan =

Turkish windsurfer (born 2005)

Personal information
- Nickname: The Daughter of Wind
- Born: 1 January 2005 (age 21) Bozcaada, Çanakkale, Turkey

Sailing career
- Sport: Sailing
- Club: Fenerbahçe Sailing
- Class: IQFoil
Medal record
Women's Windsurfing IQFoil
Representing Turkey
Youth World Championships
Gold medal – first place	2022 The Hague	Y IQFoil2
Techno 293 World Championships
Gold medal – first place	2021 Tallinn	Y IQFoil

Merve Vatan (born 1 January 2005) is a Turkish sailor competing in the windsurfing class IQFoil. She qualified to participate at the 2024 Olympics in Paris, France.

== Early years ==
Vatan started her sailing career at İÇDAŞ Sports Club in Karabiga, Çanakkale in 2015, where she was coached by Onur Yalçın.

She competed at the T293 Europeans Championship in Michmoret, Israel.

In 2021, she won the gold medal in her age category at the Techno 293 World Championships held in Tallinn, Estonia. She won the gold medal at the 2022 Youth Sailing World Championships in The Hague, Netherlands, sharing the first place with Israeli Tamar Steinberg.

Vatan participated in the 2023 Sailing World Championships in The Hague, Netherlands, and placed 52nd among 88 competitors.

She took part in the iQFOiL Class U21 World Championships 2023 in Silvaplana, Switzerland, and placed 16th among 29 competitors. In December 2023, she competed at the 2023 Youth Sailing World Championships in Armação dos Búzios, Brazil.

== Career ==
In January 2024, Vatan transferred to the Fenerbahçe Sailing.

She competed at the Last Chance Regatta of the Sailing at the 2024 Summerto Olympics – Qualification in Hyères, France. She reached the semi-finals, thereby qualifying to represent Turkey at the 2024 Summer Olympics in the Women's windsurfer – IQFoil event.

== Personal life ==
Merve Vatan was born on the island Bozcaada, Çanakkale in Turkey on 1 January 2005. She completed her secondary education at Merkez İbrahim Bodur Anatolian High School in Çanakkale.

She is nicknamed "Rüzgarın kızı" ("The Daughter of Wind").
