= Iakovos Christofides =

Cypriot windsurfer

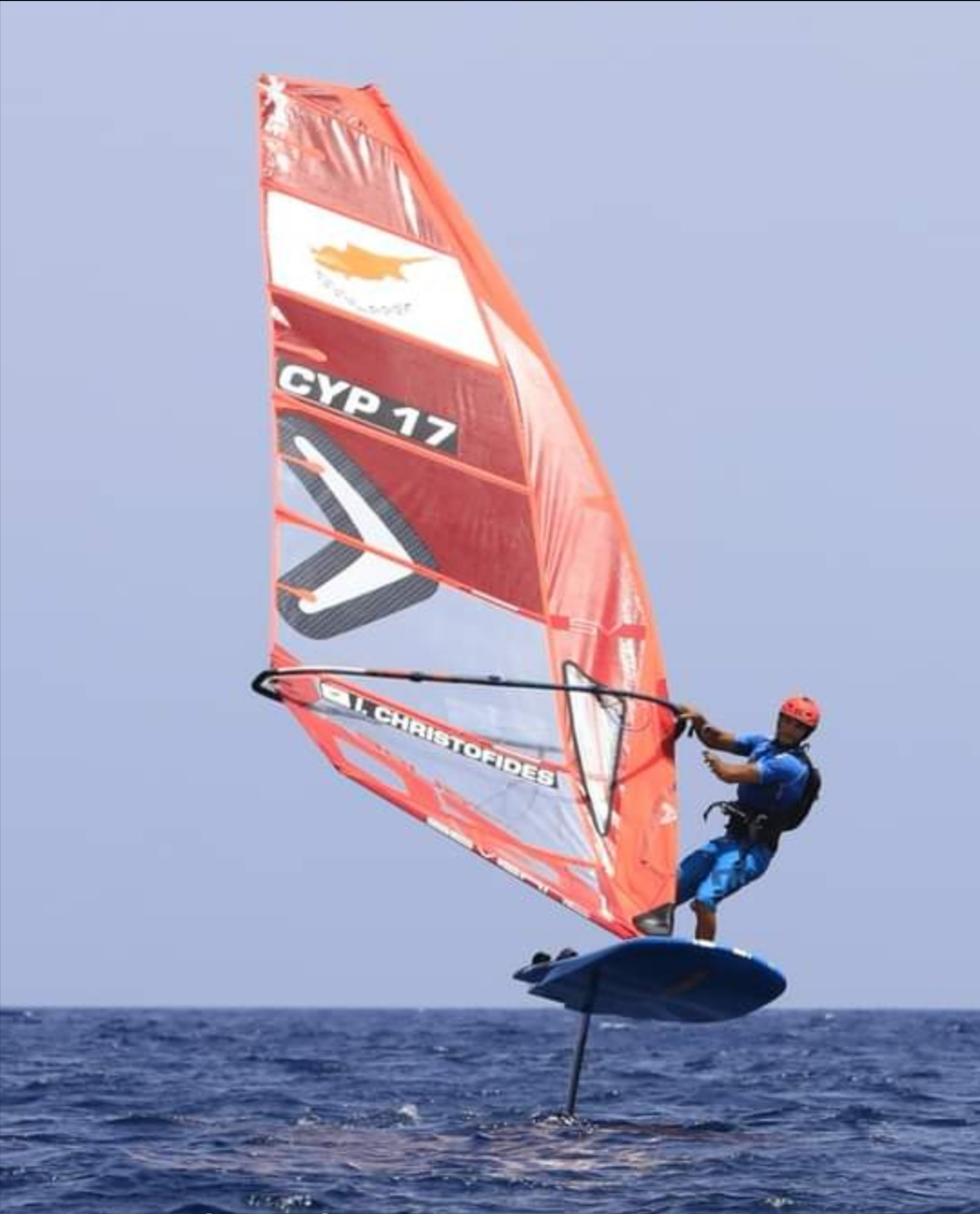
- Christofides training in Larnaca (2022)

Personal information
- Native name: Ιάκωβος Χριστοφίδης
- Nationality: Cyprus
- Born: 25 July 2005 (age 20); Larnaca, Cyprus

Sailing career
- Class(es): IQFOiL, Techno 293
- Club: Limassol Nautical Club

Iakovos Christofides (Greek: Ιάκωβος Χριστοφίδης) is a windsurfer from Cyprus, racing for the Limassol Nautical Club.

Iakovos has competed in the Techno293 class, where in 2021 finished 5th in the U17 European Championship and 7th in the U17 World Championship. In 2022 he competed in the higher class of Techno293, Techno293 Plus (U19), where he finished 2nd in the European Championship in Cagliari, and 4th in the World Championship in Limassol.

In the 2022 Mediterranean Games, Iakovos represented Cyprus in the iQFoil Men class, where he finished in the 10th place.

In 2023, he participated in the Cadiz iQFOIL International Games, where he managed to take the 3rd place in the U21 classification.
