= Matthew Barton =

Matthew Barton may refer to:

- Matthew Barton (Royal Navy officer) (c. 1715–1795), English naval officer
- Matthew Barton (tennis) (born 1991), Australian tennis player
- Matt Barton (politician) (born 1972), American politician in the state of Georgia
- Matt Barton (motorcyclist) (born 1996), Australian motorcycle racer
- Matthew Barton (sailor) (born 1995), British windsurfer
