= Sam Sills =

British sailor

Personal information
- Full name: Samuel Oliver Sills
- Nationality: British
- Born: 15 April 1993 (age 33) Launceston, Cornwall, United Kingdom

Sport
- Sport: Sailing

Samuel Oliver Sills (born 15 April 1993) is a British sailor. He competed in the IQFoil event at the 2024 Summer Olympics, where he reached the semi-finals.

== Early life ==
Sills grew up in Launceston in Cornwall, and learnt to sail on beaches and lakes in South West England. He attended Tavistock College.

He has younger identical twin sisters, Imogen and Saskia, who are also professional windsurfers.

== Career ==
Sills won the Male U15 Techno 293 World Championship in 2007, and the Male U17 World Championship in the same competition in 2009. He left the British sailing setup after becoming dissatisfied with his situation, and moved to Scandinavia, sailing part-time whilst working in the naval architecture sector.

He returned to competitive sailing in 2020, after it was announced that IQFoil would feature in the 2024 Summer Olympics. Having lived in a van for a year in order to afford sailing equipment, he finished seventh in the World Championships that year, and went on to be the leading British rider in the European Championships. He went on to finish fifth at the 2023 World Championships in Lake Garda.

Sills took part in the Men's IQFoil event at the 2024 Summer Olympics. He qualified from the preliminary race in eighth position, and finished as runner-up in the quarter-final, however failed to advance through the semi-final.
