= Emma Wilson (sailor) =

British windsurfer (born 1999)

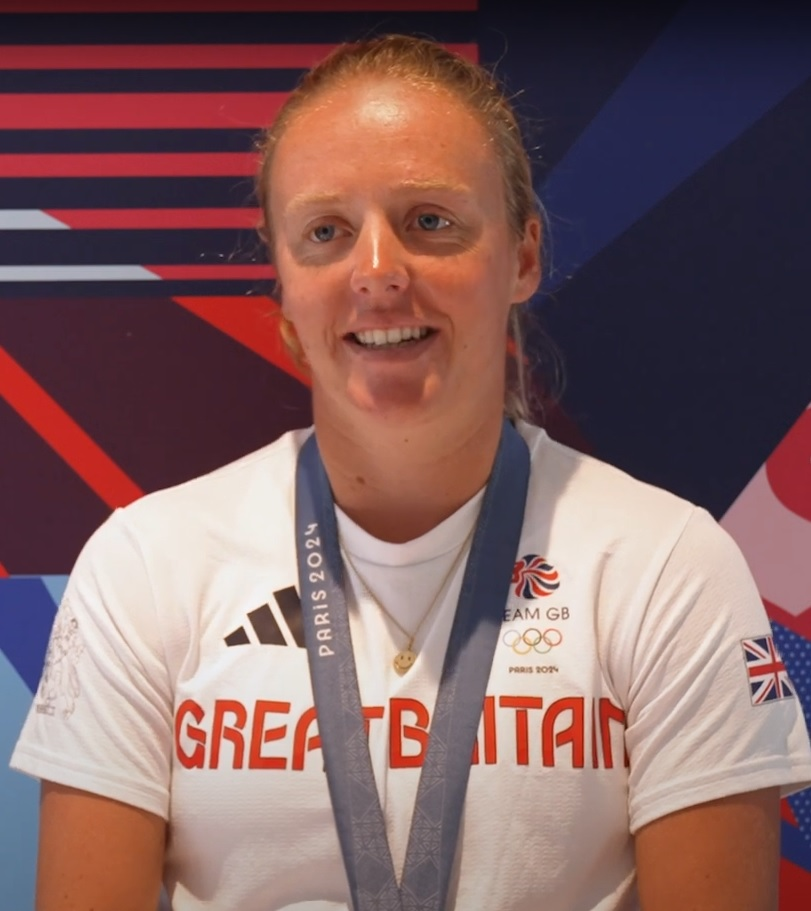
- Wilson at the 2024 Summer Olympics

Personal information
- Born: 7 April 1999 (age 27) Nottingham, England, United Kingdom

Sailing career
- Sport: Sailing
- Classes: RS:X, IQFOiL, Techno 293
Medal record
Representing Great Britain
Summer Olympics
Bronze medal – third place	2020 Tokyo	RS:X
Bronze medal – third place	2024 Paris	iQFoil
iQFoil World Championships
Gold medal – first place	2025 Aarhus	iQFoil
Silver medal – second place	2024 Lanzarote	iQFoil
Bronze medal – third place	2023 The Hague	iQFoil
RS:X European Championships
Silver medal – second place	2019 Palma	RS:X
Bronze medal – third place	2018 Sopot	RS:X
IQFoil European Championships
Silver medal – second place	2022 Torbole	iQFoil
Bronze medal – third place	2023 Patras	iQFoil
Youth Sailing World Championships
Gold medal – first place	2016 Auckland	RS:X
Gold medal – first place	2017 Sanya	RS:X
Silver medal – second place	2015 Langkawi	RS:X
Techno 293 World Championships
Gold medal – first place	2011 California	U15 Techno 293
Bronze medal – third place	2013 Sapot	U17 Techno 293
- Updated on 3 August 2024

Emma Wilson (born 7 April 1999) is a British windsurfer who won a bronze medal in the RS:X event at the 2020 Summer Olympics in Tokyo, Japan, and iQFoil event at the 2024 Summer Olympics in Paris. She has won multiple medals at the iQFoil World Championships and IQFoil European Championships and RS:X European Championships. As a youngstar, Wilson won the RS:X events at the Youth Sailing World Championships in 2016 and 2017.

== Personal life ==
Wilson was born on 7 April 1999 in Nottingham. She grew up in Christchurch, Dorset. She is the daughter of Penny Wilson (née Way), who competed at the 1992 and 1996 Summer Olympics. Her older brother Dan is also a professional sailor. When she was younger, Wilson played hockey at regional level in addition to sailing.

== Career ==
Wilson has trained alongside Bryony Shaw, who won bronze at the 2008 Summer Olympics. Aged 12, she won the U15 Techno 293 World Championships, and the U15 RS:X event. In 2015, she came second at the RS:X event at the Youth Sailing World Championships. She later won the event in 2016, and 2017. She won the 2017/18 UK Windsurfing Association Windsurfer of the Year award.

At the 2018 Sailing World Championships in Aarhus, Denmark, Wilson won the opening RS:X race by over a minute. She eventually finished fourth at the event. In the same year, she came 6th at the Sailing World Cup event in Enoshima, and came third at the RS:X European Championships in Gdańsk, Poland. She came third overall, and second European, at the 2019 RS:X European Championships in Palma de Mallorca, and came fourth at the 2020 RS:X World Championships, 11 points behind third place.

Wilson qualified to compete in the RS:X event at the 2020 Summer Olympics in Tokyo, Japan. After the Olympics were postponed from 2020 to 2021, British Sailing confirmed that their squad selection were unchanged, and so Wilson was still selected for the Games. She finished fourth in the Olympic test event in 2019.

At the Games, Wilson finished first, second and fourth in the three races on the second day, finishing the day second overall, tied on points with leader Charline Picon. On the third day of racing at the Games, Wilson won two of the three races, and moved into first place overall. After the fourth and final day of heats, Wilson was second behind China's Lu Yunxiu. She eventually finished third in the event.

In 2022, Wilson came second at the IQFoil European Championships, her first major event in the iQFoil class. She won the 2023 Trofeo Princesa Sofía event, and came third at the 2023 IQFoil European Championships. Wilson also came third in the iQFoil event at the 2023 Sailing World Championships, which meant that Great Britain qualified a competitor for the event at the 2024 Summer Olympics. Later in the year, Wilson was confirmed as Team GB's selection for the Games together with fellow surfer Ellie Aldridge who competes in the new Olympic sport of Formula Kite. Wilson later took silver at the 2024 iQFoil World Championships, winning 15 of the 20 races in the competition in Lanzarotte. There were four other British women windsurfers and the next highest placed was Islay Watson who was 20th.

Wilson won a bronze medal in the iQFoil event at the 2024 Summer Olympics. She was beaten by the Israeli Sharon Kantor and the Italian Marta Maggetti took the gold. Wilson was very disappointed at the result, as a new format meant that although she had done very well in the competition, she had not won the gold medal, because of the final race. She told the press that she was probably done with windsurfing. Wilson won the 2025 iQFoil World Championships event.

== See also ==
- List of European Championships medalists in sailing
