= Matthew Barton (sailor) =

British windsurfer (born 1995)

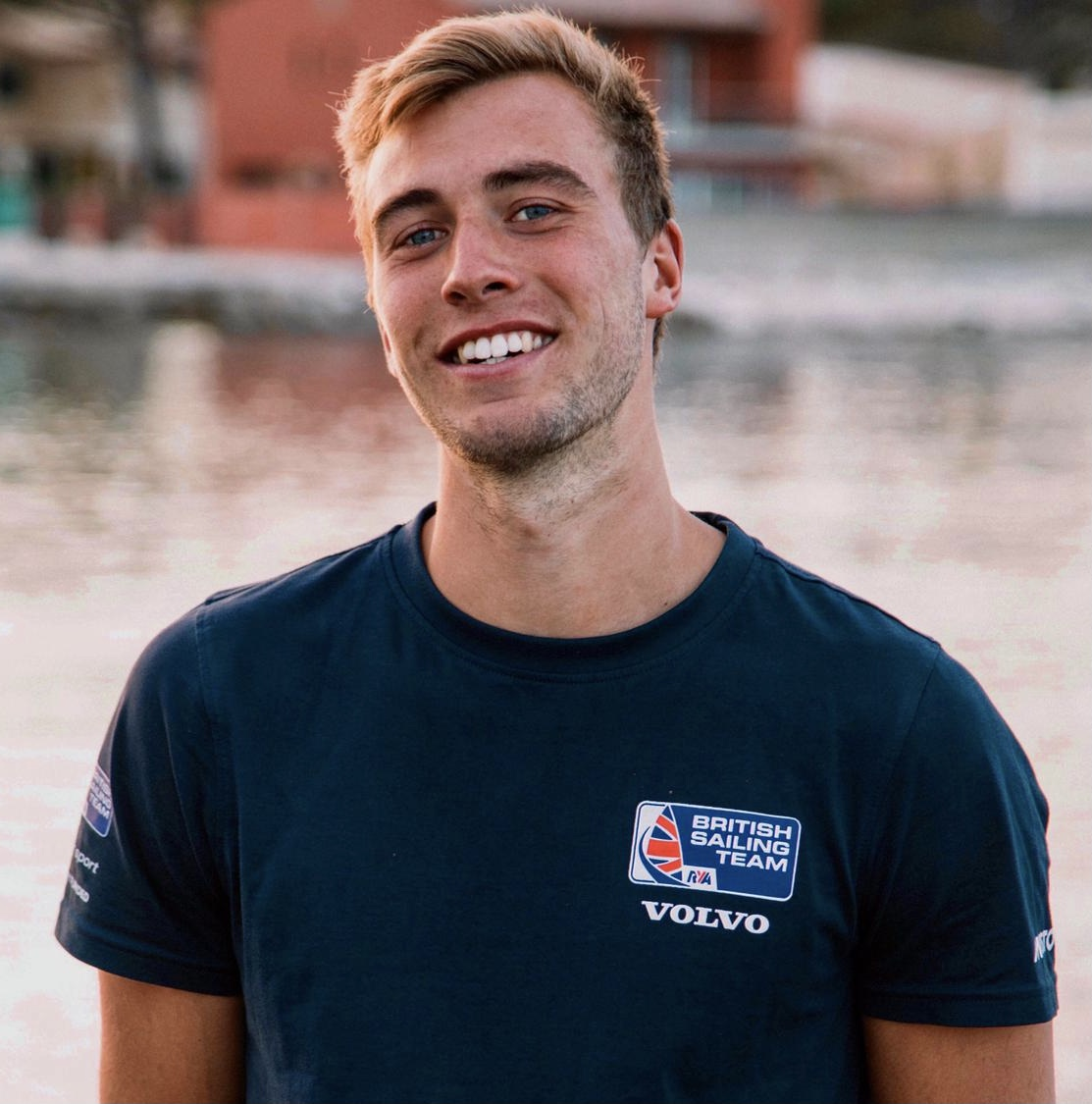

Personal information
- Nationality: British
- Born: 5 September 1995 (age 30)
- Height: 1.88 m (6 ft 2 in)

Sport
- Country: United Kingdom
- Sport: Windsurfing
- Event: Men's IQFoil class
Medal record
Men's sailing
Representing Great Britain
Silver medal – second place	2021 IQFoil World Championships	Silvaplana, Switzerland
Bronze medal – third place	2021 IQFoil International Games	Lake Garda, Italy
Bronze medal – third place	2024 IQFoil European Championships	Cagliari, Italy

Matthew James Barton (born 5 September 1995) is a British windsurfer. He competes in windsurfing in the IQFoil class and won silver in the 2021 IQFoil World Championships.

== Windsurfing career ==
Matthew Barton started windsurfing aged 12 at Alton Water Sailing Club and started racing with Team15 club Alton Water Wipeouts coached by Ian (Rocky) Haywood. By October 2008, he took 3rd place in the Champions Cup 4.5m class. From here, he transitioned to 5.5m open class before competing nationally on the Techno 293 board in the 6.8m class.

He took part in his first international competition at the Junior and Youth world Championships held in Martigues, France in 2010.

Following this, we completed both nationally and internationally in the RS:X youth class before competing in the open class.

He joined the British Sailing Team in 2017 as part of the Podium Potential Pathway squad and took up windsurfing full time following graduation.

In 2019, Matthew transitioned to windfoiling and started to compete in the class during the 2020 season. He currently competes in the Olympic class IQFoil.

His biggest achievements have come in the IQFoil class and in 2020 he achieved a 1st place in the IQ Foil Class of the Formula Foil World Championships followed by a 5th-place finish in the IQFoil International Games. This was followed up in 2021 by a 3rd-place finish in the IQFoil International Games and a 2nd place in the IQFoil World Championships.

== Personal life ==
Matthew Barton (born 5 September 1995) grew up near Bury St Edmunds in Suffolk.

He studied Health Sciences at University of Exeter between 2014 and 2017. During this time, he was part of the University of Exeter Sailing Club and was commodore for the club in 2016–2017. In 2017 he competed in the BUCS windsurfing competition, which he won. During his tenure as commodore of the club, Exeter University Sailing Club won club of the year and Matthew won club captain of the year at University of Exeter Athletic Union annual awards.

== See also ==
- List of iQFoil Windsurfing World Championships medalists
