= María Belén Bazo =

Peruvian windsurfer (born 1998)

Personal information
- Full name: María Belén Bazo Germán
- Born: 7 August 1998 (age 27) Lima, Peru

Sailing career
- Sport: Sailing
- Class(es): RS:X, Techno 293, iQFoil, Funboard
Medal record
Women's sailing
Representing Peru
Pan American Games
Bronze medal – third place	2019 Lima	RS:X
South American Games
Gold medal – first place	2022 Asunción	iQFoil
South American Beach Games
Gold medal – first place	2019 Rosario	RS:X
Bolivarian Beach Games
Gold medal – first place	2014 Huanchaco	RS:X
Youth World Championships
Bronze medal – third place	2016 Auckland	RS:X
South American Youth Games
Gold medal – first place	2013 Lima	Techno 293

María Belén Bazo Germán (Note: In this Spanish name, the first or paternal surname is Bazo and the second or maternal family name is Germán.) (born 7 August 1998) is a Peruvian windsurfer who previously competed in the RS:X class and now competes in the iQFoil class.

Bazo competed at the 2019 Pan American Games where she won a bronze medal in the RS:X event.

She competed at the 2020 Summer Olympics where she came 13th in the RS:X event.

In the 2024 Summer Olympics she came 4th in the iQFoil event.
