= Mateus Isaac =

Brazilian sailor

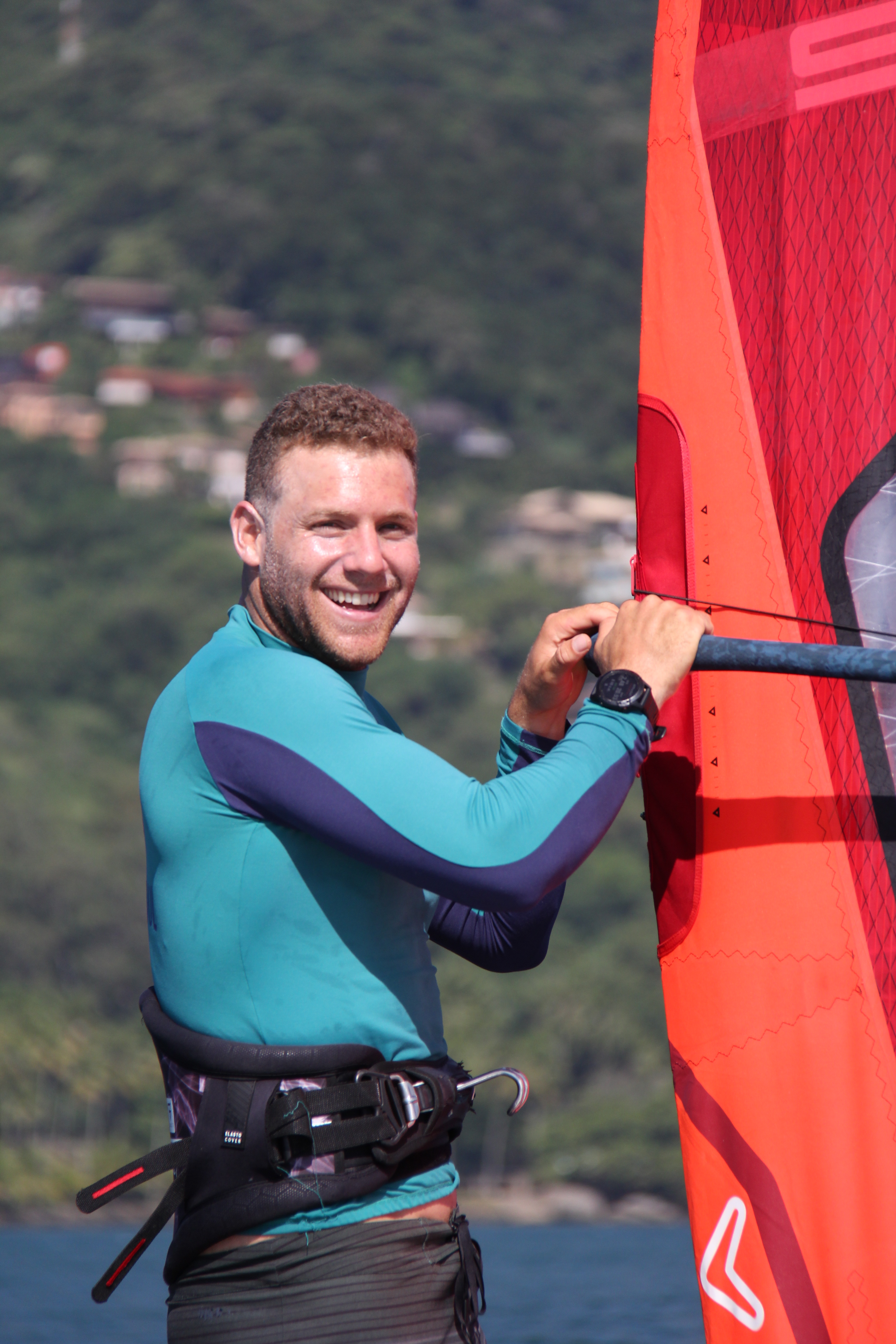
- Mateus Isaac, 2022

Personal information
- Full name: Mateus Ghannam Isaac
- Nationality: Brazil
- Born: 16 January 1994 (age 32) São Paulo, São Paulo

Sailing career
- Sport: Sailing
- Class: IQFoil
Medal record
Sailing
Representing Brazil
Pan American Games
Gold medal – first place	2023 Santiago	Men's IQFoil
IQFoil European Championships
Bronze medal – third place	2021 Marseille	Men's

Mateus Ghannam Isaac (born 16 January 1994) is a Brazilian windsurfer. He has six titles in World Tour championships in the IQFoil class, and was in the lead in the world rankings in 2022.

== Early career ==
Born in São Paulo, Mateus Isaac began sailing as a child in the city of Ilhabela, on the coast of São Paulo, influenced by his father. However, his career on the sporting scene began playing football.

As a child, Mateus played football at the school he studied at and was part of a football school. Dedicated to ball sports, the Brazilian gave priority to the championships he competed in and stopped sailing from the age of seven to 10.

Mateus only returned to sailing when his family moved to Florianópolis, in Santa Catarina, but he continued to prioritize football. He joined youth teams at Figueirense and Vasco, which had a headquarters there, but ended up giving up his career due to logistical problems.

After giving up, Mateus turned his attention to sailing. Later, after returning to São Paulo, he began participating in junior windsurfing championships from the age of 14.

In his first international competition, an Under-16 World Cup, Mateus Isaac finished in second place. At the age of 15, he was Brazilian and South American junior champion. Three years later, at 18, he won the world title in the sport.

However, Mateus had difficulty finding sponsors who would invest in his windsurfing career. Faced with the situation, he thought about abandoning the sport and started studying administration, to have an alternative way of life away from the waters.

It was only the following year, after another runner-up in the world championship, that the Brazilian managed to form a partnership with a sponsor for his career. In this partnership, Mateus was invited to live in Hawaii, in the United States, to complete his studies and practice windsurfing. After four years living in the American state, he finished college and decided he would become a professional sports athlete.

At 20 years old, Mateus won his second junior world title. He then became part of the windsurfing World Tour.

== Senior career ==
In October 2019, Mateus won the South American Slalom championship, in the Funboard Men category, and won his first World Tour title. At the same time, he ended the year in fifth place in the world rankings and had one of his best seasons in his career.

After remaining in the top 10 in the world in 2020, Mateus won a stage of the World Tour again in January 2021, when he was Miami OCR champion in the IQFoil category. In the following competition, in February, the windsurfer achieved another positive result and took the Clearwater OCR title.

The Brazilian maintained his good form in subsequent tournaments and won the Copa Brasil de Vela, in addition to placing third in the European championship in Marseille, France. With the results, Mateus took the lead in the IQFoil world ranking in November.

In December, the windsurfer ended the season with another South American championship title. In 2022, Mateus came second in the stage of the international circuit in Lanzarote, Spain, and was champion in the Puerto Sherry edition, in Cádiz, also on Spanish soil.

At the 2023 Pan American Games held in Santiago, Chile, he won a gold medal in the Men's IQFoil. He has qualified for the 2024 Summer Olympics.

== See also ==
- List of European Championships medalists in sailing
