= Sailing at the 2018 Summer Youth Olympics – Girls' Techno 293+ =

Girls' Techno 293+ at the III Summer Youth Olympic Games
- Venue: Club Náutico San Isidro
- Dates: 7–12 October
- Competitors: 23 from 23 nations
- Winning total: 21 points

Medalists
1st place, gold medalist(s)		Giorgia Speciale	Italy
2nd place, silver medalist(s)		Manon Pianazza	France
3rd place, bronze medalist(s)		Yana Reznikova	Russia

Girls' Techno 293+ class competition at the 2018 Summer Youth Olympics took place from 7 to 12 October at the Club Náutico San Isidro.

== Schedule ==
Sun 7 Oct	Mon 8 Oct	Tue 9 Oct	Wed 10 Oct	Thu 11 Oct	Fri 12 Oct
Race 1 Race 2	Race 3	Race 4 Race 6	Race 7 Race 8 Race 9	Race 10; Race 11; Race 12	Final race

== Results ==
Rank	Helmsman	Nationality	I	II	III	IV	V	VI	VII	VIII	IX	X	XI	XII	FR	Total points	Net points
1st place, gold medalist(s)	Giorgia Speciale	Italy	1	1	3	3		2	1	2	3	3	4^{†}	1	1	25	21
2nd place, silver medalist(s)	Manon Pianazza	France	3	2	5	10^{†}		1	8	1	7	1	2	7	2	49	39
3rd place, bronze medalist(s)	Yana Reznikova	Russia	2	3	1	13^{†}		4	2	13	8	6	1	3	3	59	46
4	Naama Gazit	Israel	5	5	4	2		5	7	4	2	4	3	16^{†}	6	63	47
5	Aikaterini Divari	Greece	12	12	6	6		14^{†}	6	3	1	5	13	5	4	87	73
6	Celina Saubidet	Argentina	8	11	12	4		10	21^{†}	6	4	2	7	4	11	100	79
7	Yuliya Matveenko	Belarus	4	7	2	21^{†}		17	3	16	6	12	6	2	5	101	80
8	Mak Cheuk Wing	Hong Kong	6	4	7	12^{†}		7	5	5	9	9	9	8	24; BFD	105	93
9	Lidia Sulikowska	Poland	9	6	8	5		6	10	8	13	18^{†}	12	17	8	120	102
10	Palma Čargo	Croatia	18^{†}	9	10	7		11	4	7	17	7	8	16; STP	14	128	110
11	Islay Watson	Great Britain	17	14	13	8		9	12	18^{†}	5	10	11	6	15	138	120
12	Dominique Stater	United States	10	15	24^{†} DSQ	15		3	9	9	11	14	19	9	9	147	123
13	Veerle ten Have	New Zealand	11	8	15	1		12	13	11	10	15	14	24^{†} UFD	13	147	123
14	Joanna Diego	Mexico	14	16	11	9		8	17^{†}	10	12	13	5	11	18	144	127
15	Marsha Shahrin	Singapore	7	10	14	18		15	14	15	15	16	20^{†}	10	7	161	141
16	Helle Oppedal	Norway	15	18	9	17		18	11	12	14	8	10	24^{†} UFD	16	172	148
17	Wang Chih-ling	Chinese Taipei	13	17	24^{†} UFD	14		16	16	17	19	17	16	13	10	192	168
18	Eda Yavuz	Turkey	20	21	24^{†} DNF	11		13	18	14	16	19	17	12	17	202	178
19	Giovanna Prada	Brazil	16	13	17	16		19^{†}	15	19	18	11	15	18	20	197	178
20	Cristina Arróspide	Peru	21	19	18	24^{†} DNF		20	22	24; UFD	20	20	18	14	12	232	208
21	Hailey Lea	Australia	19	20	16	20		23; STP	19	20	22	21	24^{†} DNF	19	19	242	218
22	Lina Ait Ali Slimane	Algeria	24^{†} BFD	22	24; DNF	22		21	23	21	21	23	24; DNF	20	21	266	242
23	Salma Wael Ibrahim	Egypt	22	23	24^{†} DNF	19		23	20	24; UFD	23	22	24; DNF	22; STP	22	268	244

Scoring system: low-point system;
Legend: BFD – Black flag disqualification; DNF – Did not finish; DSQ – Disqualified; UFD – "U" flag disqualification; † – Discarded race not counted in the overall result;
