= Finn Hawkins =

British windsurfer

Personal information
- Full name: Finn Barry J. Hawkins
- Nationality: British
- Born: 10 December 2002 (age 23) St. Austell, Cornwall, England
- Education: Truro School

Sport
- Country: United Kingdom
- Sport: Windsurfing
Medal record
World U21 Sailing Championships
Bronze medal – third place	2018 Liepāja	Techno 293 Youth
IQFoil European Championships
Gold medal – first place	2020 Silvaplana	iQFoil Youth
IQFoil International Games
Gold medal – first place	2020 Lake Garda	iQFoil U19
Gold medal – first place	2022 Lanzarote	iQFoil U21
Bronze medal – third place	2022 Lanzarote	iQFoil Open
Silver medal – second place	2023 Lanzarote	iQFoil Open
IQFoil World Championships
Gold medal – first place	2021 Silvaplana	iQFoil U21
Bronze medal – third place	2024 Lanzarote	iQFoil U23
Gold medal – first place	2024 Silvaplana	iQFoil U23
Summer Youth Olympics
Bronze medal – third place	2018 Buenos Aires	Techno 293+

Finn Hawkins (born 10 December 2002) is a British windsurfer. He won a bronze medal at the 2018 World U21 Sailing Championships in Liepāja and a bronze medal, and Team GB's first, at the 2018 Summer Youth Olympics in Buenos Aires. He was subsequently a nominee for the UK Windsurfing Association's 2018 Windsurfer of the Year.

Hawkins placed 26th overall in the 2020 iQFoil European Championships in Silvaplana, Switzerland, and first within the youth section. He also won the U19 section of the 2020 iQFoil International Games at Lake Garda in Italy. In 2021, Hawkins won Men's U21 gold in the inaugural iQFoil World Championships in Silvaplana. He won the under 21 division at the 2022 iQFoil International Games, coming third overall. In December 2023, he won silver in the iQFoil Games in Lanzarote, only losing to Luuc van Opzeeland. Hawkins came third in the under 23 class at the iQFoil World Championships in February 2024 and placed 12th overall.

== U23 World Champion ==
In 2024, Hawkins won the U23 iQFoil World Championship at Lake Silvaplana, Switzerland, during the Vanora ENGADINWIND 2024 event.

== See also ==
- List of iQFoil Windsurfing World Championships medalists
