= Shahar Tibi =

Israeli sailor

Personal information
- Native name: שחר טיבי
- National team: Israel
- Born: 26 October 1997 (age 28)

Sport
- Country: Israel
- Sport: Windsurfing
- Events: 470, IQFoil
- Coached by: Shahar Tzuberi

Achievements and titles
- Olympic finals: 8th (2020)
- World finals: (gold) (2023)
- European finals: (silver) (2026)
Medal record
Sailing
Representing Israel
iQFoil World Championships
Gold medal – first place	2023 The Hague	iQFoil
IQFoil European Championships
Silver medal – second place	2026 Portimão	iQFoil
- Updated on 9 September 2023

Shahar Tibi (Hebrew: שחר טיבי; born 26 October 1997) is an Israeli sailor.

== Career ==
Tibi represented Israel at the 2020 Summer Olympics alongside Noya Bar Am, competing in the women's 470 event.

In 2023, Tibi won the gold medal at the iQFoil category at the Sailing World Championships.

In 2026, Tibi won the silver medal at the IQFoil European Championships.

== See also ==
- List of iQFoil Windsurfing World Championships medalists
