= 2023 Youth Sailing World Championships =

Event title
- Edition: 52nd

Event details
- Venue: Búzios, Brazil
- Dates: 8 - 16 December 2023

The 2023 Youth Sailing World Championships took place in Búzios, Brazil from 8 to 16 December. It was the 52nd edition of the Youth Sailing World Championships.

== Competition format ==
=== Events and equipment ===
Event	Equipment
Boy's dinghy (single hander)	ILCA 6
Boy's windsurfer	iQFOiL
Boy's kitesurfer	Formula Kite
Girl's dinghy (single hander)	ILCA 6
Girl's dinghy (double hander)	420
Girl's skiff	29er
Girl's windsurfer	iQFOiL
Girl's kitesurfer	Formula Kite
Male/Mixed dinghy (double hander) (Note: Male/mixed. Male pairings allowed, mixed parings allowed, female pairings not allowed)	420
Male/Mixed skiff (Note: Male/mixed. Male pairings allowed, mixed parings allowed, female pairings not allowed)	29er
Mixed Multihull	Nacra 15

== Summary ==
=== Medal table ===
* Host nation (Brazil)

Rank	Nation	Gold	Silver	Bronze	Total
1	Italy	2	3	1	6
2	Poland	2	0	0	2
3	France	1	2	1	4
4	Spain	1	0	1	2
5	Brazil*	1	0	0	1
5	Czech Republic	1	0	0	1
5	Netherlands	1	0	0	1
5	Singapore	1	0	0	1
5	Turkey	1	0	0	1
10	Slovenia	0	2	0	2
11	Israel	0	1	1	2
12	Argentina	0	1	0	1
12	China	0	1	0	1
12	United States	0	1	0	1
15	Ireland	0	0	2	2
16	Great Britain	0	0	1	1
16	Greece	0	0	1	1
16	Hungary	0	0	1	1
16	Portugal	0	0	1	1
16	Switzerland	0	0	1	1
Totals (20 entries)		11	11	11	33

=== Event medalists ===
==== Men's events ====
Event	First	Second	Third
ILCA 6	Mattia Cesana; Italy	Luka Zabukovec; Slovenia	João Pontes; Portugal
iQFOiL	Stanisław Trepczyński; Poland	Leonardo Tomasini; Italy	Noé Garandeau; France
Formula Kite	Maximilian Maeder; Singapore	Qibin Huang; China	Riccardo Pianosi; Italy

==== Women's events ====
Event	First	Second	Third
ILCA 6	Roos Wind; Netherlands	Emma Mattivi; Italy	Sienna Wright; Ireland
420	Joana Faulhaber Tostes Antunes Gonç; Gabriela Vassel; Brazil	Maayan Shemesh; Emilie Louviot; Israel	Emilie Iakovina; Giannouli Danai; Greece
29er	Ewa Lewandowska; Julia Maria Żmudzińska; Poland	Sarah Jannin; Fleur Babin; France	Boróka Fehér; Szonja Fehér; Hungary
iQFOiL	Kristyna Pinosova; Czech Republic	Lina Erzen; Slovenia	Darcey Shaw; Great Britain
Formula Kite	Derin Atakan; Turkey	Catalina Turienzo; Argentina	Mika Kafri; Israel

==== Mixed events ====
Event	First	Second	Third
Nacra 15	Daniel Garcia de la Casa; Nora Garcia de la Casa; Spain	Cody Roe; Brooke Mertz; United States	Marie Mazuay; Clément Guignard; Switzerland
420 (Note: Male/mixed. Male pairings allowed, mixed parings allowed, female pairings not allowed)	Quan Cardi; Mattia Tognocchi; Italy	Zou Schemmel; Jean-Philippe Boudard; France	Miguel Angel Morales Hernandez; Alejandro Martin; Spain
29er (Note: Male/mixed. Male pairings allowed, mixed parings allowed, female pairings not allowed)	Hugo Revil; Karl Devaux; France	Alex Demurtas; Giovanni Santi; Italy	Ben O'Shaughnessy; Ethan Spain; Ireland
