= Aleksandra Blinnikka =

Finnish windsurfer (born 1992)

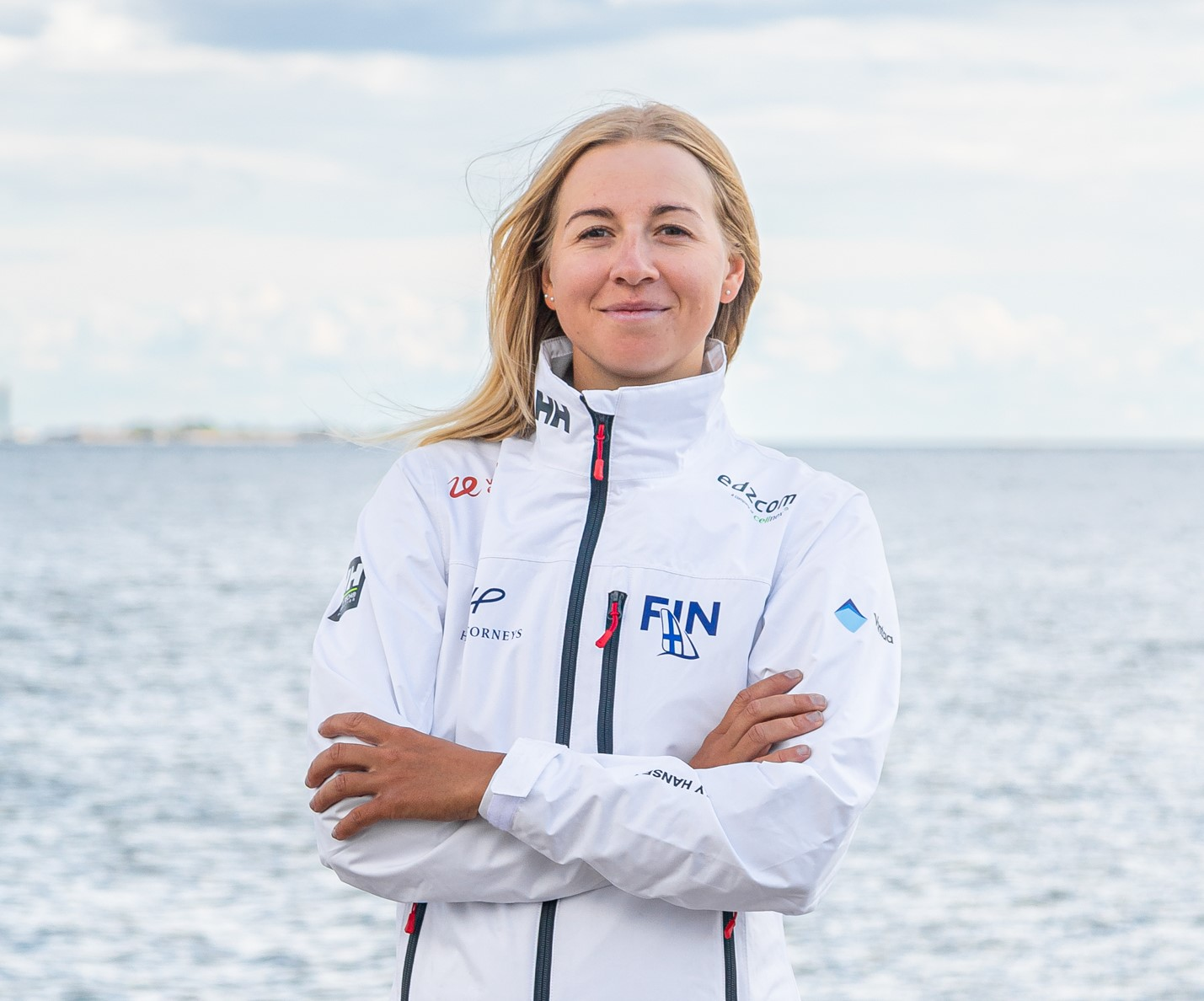

Personal information
- Nationality: Finnish
- Born: Aleksandra Anastasia Blinnikka; 30 December 1992 (age 33) Vantaa
- Height: 173 cm (5 ft 8 in)

Sport

Sailing career
- Class(es): IQFOIL Olympic class, RS:X Olympic class, Raceboard, Windsurfer LT
- Club: Helsingfors Segelklubb
- Coach: Borja Carracedo Serra

Aleksandra Blinnikka (born 30 December 1992) is a professional windsurfer from Finland. She began competing internationally in 2013, initially in the Raceboard Class. Over the years, she has participated in various windsurfing disciplines, including Raceboard, RS:X Olympic Class, IQFoil Olympic Class, PWA tour and Windsurfer LT events. In 2020, she transitioned to the newly introduced IQFOIL Olympic class, which was featured in the 2024 Summer Olympics. Blinnikka has secured three Gold medals - one at the Windsurfer LT World Championships and two at the Raceboard World Championships and the European Championships. At the start of 2026 she announced her retirement from windsurfing competitions.

In both 2018 and 2019, she was nominated as "Athlete of the Year" in Vantaa and was among the top 11 nominees for the "Sports Moment of the Year" at the Finnish Sports Gala - Urheilugaala.

== International Competition Records ==
=== Windsurfer LT ===
- 2025 Gold medalist in the World Championships
- 2024 Bronze medalist in the European Championships

=== IQFOIL Olympic Class ===
- 2024 14th in the Olympics Last Chance Qualifier Regatta, Hyeres
- 2024 66th in the iQFoil World Championships, Lanzarote
- 2023 56th in the World Championships, The Hague
- 2023 21st in the Olympic Test Event, Marseile
- 2023 47th in the European Championships, Patras
- 2023 52nd in the Princesa Sofia World Cup, Mallorca
- 2022 26th in the iQFoil European Championship, Garda
- 2022 31st in the Princesa Sofia World Cup, Mallorca
- 2021 34th in the iQFoil European Championship, Marseille
- 2021 44th in the iQFoil World Championship, Silvaplana

=== RS:X Olympic Class ===
- 2020 29th in the RS:X European Championships, Vilamoura
- 2019 98th in the RS:X Windsurfing World Championships, Garda

=== Raceboard World Championships ===
- 2019 Gold medalist
- 2018 Gold medalist
- 2017 Bronze medalist
- 2015 Silver medalist
- 2014 6th place
- 2013 10th place

=== Raceboard European Championships ===
- 2019 Silver medalist
- 2018 Gold medalist
- 2015 Gold medalist
- 2014 Bronze medalist
