= Marta Maggetti =

Italian windsurfer

Personal information
- Born: 10 January 1996 (age 30) Cagliari, Italy
Medal record
Women's sailing
Representing Italy
Olympic Games
Gold medal – first place	2024 Paris	iQFoil
iQFoil World Championships
Gold medal – first place	2022 Brest	iQFoil

Marta Maggetti (born 10 January 1996) is an Italian windsurfer who sailed in the RS:X class and then later the iQFoil windsurfer class. She was fourth in the Tokyo Olympics in 2021 on a windsurfer and in 2022 she won the IQFoil World Championship. She won a gold medal in the 2024 Paris Olympics

== Career ==
Maggetti was born in the Italian city of Cagliari on the island of Sardinia in 1996.

Her first coach was Andrea Beverino and she joined her local windsurfing club where her father was a member. She had tried other sports including rhythmic gymnastics. At the age of eight she took a strong interest in sailing. In 2013 she was 17 and a member of the Caglieri Sailing Club when she went to Cyprus to return that July with a silver medal from the Under-19 World Championship. She then windsurfed to win the RS:X Youth World Championship which was held in Italy at Civitavecchia.

In 2017 she and fellow surfer Carlo Ciabatti set their ambitions on the Tokyo Olympics. At the end of that year the two of them set out an organisation to raise the local sponsorship from Sardinian businesses.

She competed at the 2020 Tokyo Olympics after being chosen against her rival Giorgia Speciale. Italy was hopeful of her success as they had not won an Olympic sailing medal for some time. She had come fourth in the 2021 European championships. She missed an Olympic medal as she was fourth in the RS:X class.

In 2022 she had transitioned from success at windsurfing to surfing with a hydrofoil. Her coach was Belli Dell'Isca. She won a gold medal at the 2022 IQFoil World Championships in Brest. The silver and bronze medals went to the Israeli teenager Daniela Peleg and Maya Morris.

Based on her successes in 2022, Maggetti was chosen in February 2024 to join Italy's team at the 2024 Summer Olympics where she won a gold medal. She beat the Israeli Sharon Kantor and the British Emma Wilson In September she was honoured in her home town with a reception by the City council president, Marco Benucci, and the mayor of Cagliari Massimo Zedda.

== See also ==
- Italian sportswomen multiple medalists at Olympics and World Championships
