= Luuc van Opzeeland =

Dutch sailor (born 1999)

Personal information
- Nationality: Dutch
- Born: 21 May 1999 (age 27) Hoofddorp, Netherlands

Sport
- Sport: Sailing
Medal record
Men's sailing
Representing Netherlands
Olympic Games
Bronze medal – third place	2024 Paris	IQFoil
iQFoil World Championships
Gold medal – first place	2023 The Hague	iQFoil
Gold medal – first place	2026 Weymouth	iQFoil
Silver medal – second place	2022 Brest	iQFoil
Bronze medal – third place	2021 Silvaplana	iQFoil
Bronze medal – third place	2024 Lanzarote	iQFoil
IQFoil European Championships
Gold medal – first place	2025 Sferracavallo	iQFoil
Gold medal – first place	2026 Portimão	iQFoil
Bronze medal – third place	2022 Torbole	iQFoil

Luuc van Opzeeland (born 21 May 1999) is a Dutch sailor. He competed in the IQFoil event at the 2024 Summer Olympics, where he won the bronze medal.
