= Mina Mobekk =

Norwegian sailor

Personal information
- Nationality: Norwegian
- Born: 11 June 2004 (age 22)

Sport
- Sport: Sailing
- Club: Royal Norwegian Yacht Club
Medal record
Representing Norway
European Championships
Gold medal – first place	2023 Greece	IQFoil

Mina Mobekk (born 11 June 2004) is a Norwegian competitive sailor.

== Results ==
She is European champion in IQFoil from 2023.

== Career ==
Born on 11 June 2004, Mobekk represents the Royal Norwegian Yacht Club. Her international breakthrough came in May 2023, when she won a gold medal at the IQFoil European Championships in Greece.

Competing at the 2023 Sailing World Championships, she placed fourth in IQFoil, which qualified for a spot for Norway in the 2024 Olympics. In May 2024 she was selected to represent Norway at the 2024 Summer Olympics.
