= Richard Hamilton (Medal of Honor) =

- Civil War era Navy Medal of Honor
- Born: January 23, 1836; Southwark, Philadelphia, Pennsylvania, US
- Died: July 6, 1881 (aged 45); Camden, New Jersey, US
- Burial place: Evergreen Cemetery; Camden, New Jersey
- Military career
- Allegiance: United States; Union
- Branch: US Navy; Union Navy
- Service years: 1862–1865
- Rank: Coal Heaver
- Unit: U.S. Picket Boat No. 1
- Conflicts: American Civil War
- Awards: Medal of Honor

Richard Hamilton (January 23, 1836 – July 6, 1881), a Union Navy Coal Heaver, received the Medal of Honor for bravery for his participation in the sinking of the CSS Albemarle during the American Civil War.

== Military service ==
Hamilton, a native of Philadelphia, Pennsylvania, served in the Union Navy from 1862 to 1865. He was taken prisoner after the action on the Roanoke River for which he would later be honored.

An article appeared in the July 4, 1879, Philadelphia Times newspaper about Hamilton. It read:

Richard Hamilton lives at 260 Liberty street, Camden. He declares that he was one of the number who, with Cushing, aided in blowing up the Rebel ram Albemarle, at Plymouth, N. C., October 27, 1864. When he enlisted he was a resident of this city. He is now unable to work and his family are in destitute circumstances. "Cushing and the officers got all the prize money," remarked Hamilton the other day, "while us privates received nothing. Had I my share, over two thousand dollars, I need not live as I live now. Twelve of us have not received a cent from the government, although the matter has been brought before the courts and Congress." Hamilton was honorably discharged and was awarded the medal of honor, March 12, 1865, for gallant and meritorious conduct while serving in the picket boat which destroyed the Rebel ram Albemarle. The inscription on the medal reads: "Personal valor - Richard Hamilton, Coal Heaver, Picket Boat No. 1 - Destruction of the Albemarle, October 27, 1864.

== Medal of Honor citation ==
Rank and organization: Coal Heaver, U.S. Navy. Accredited to: Pennsylvania G.O. No.: 45, December 31, 1864.

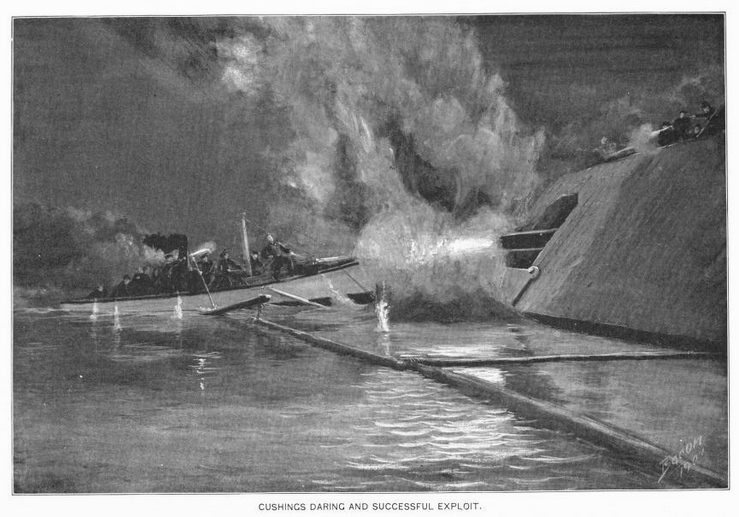
"Cushings Daring and Successful Exploit"

Hamilton's official Medal of Honor citation reads:

Hamilton served on board the U.S. Picket Boat No. 1, in action, 27 October 1864, against the Confederate ram Albemarle which had resisted repeated attacks by our steamers and had kept a large force of vessels employed in watching her. The picket boat, equipped with a spar torpedo, succeeded in passing the enemy pickets within 20 yards without being discovered and then made for the Albemarle under a full head of steam. Immediately taken under fire by the ram, the small boat plunged on, jumped the log boom which encircled the target and exploded its torpedo under the port bow of the ram. The picket boat was destroyed by enemy fire and almost the entire crew taken prisoner or lost.

== Death and burial ==
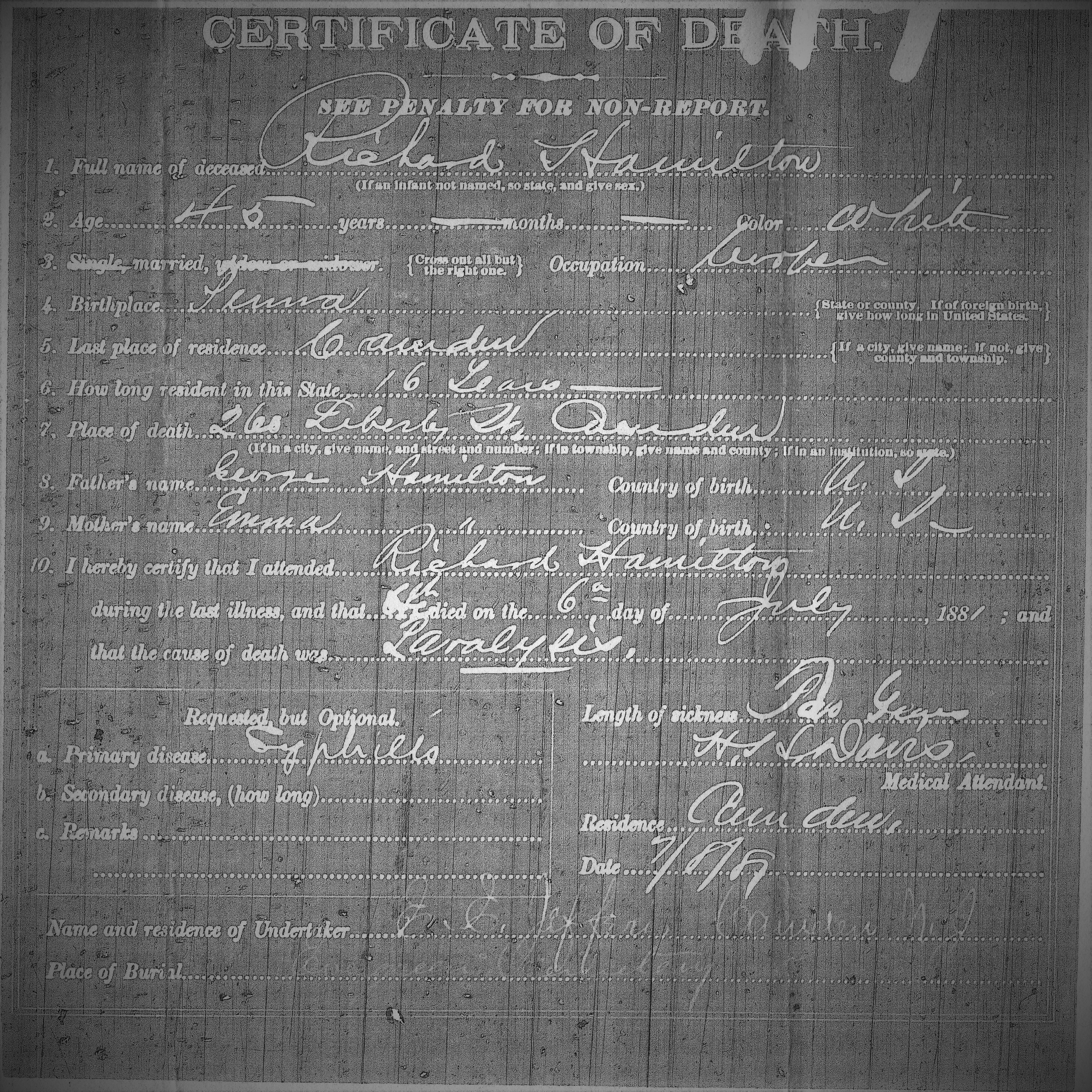
Hamilton's NJ death certificate indicating burial in Evergreen Cemetery, Camden, NJ.

Medal of Honor recipient Richard Hamilton survived the war and died in Camden, New Jersey, on July 6, 1881, due to paralysis complicated by syphilis. He was buried July 10, 1881, in Evergreen Cemetery, Camden, New Jersey in the Thomas M. K. Lee Jr. GAR Post No. 5 Lot, which is Section O, lot 367 & 369 in the northern end of the cemetery. His grave is marked by an illegible, weathered marble U.S. Govt. headstone that was issued in 1888. A new US Govt. issued Medal of Honor grave marker was installed on his grave and dedicated July 6, 2024, the 143rd year anniversary of his death.

Hamilton's death notice in the July 8, 1881, Philadelphia Record newspaper read:

HAMILTON - On the 6th inst., RICHARD, son of the late George and Emma Hamilton, aged 45 years. The relatives and friends of the family; also T. M. K. Lee Post, No. 5; William B. Hatch Post, No. 37, G. A. R. and Gospel Temperance Union, No. 1, of Camden, N. J., are respectfully invited to attend the funeral, on Sunday, 10th inst., at 2 o'clock, from his late residence, No. 260 Liberty street, Camden, N. J. To proceed to Evergreen Cemetery.

Hamilton's funeral article in the July 11, 1881, Philadelphia Inquirer newspaper read:

Large Funeral - Yesterday Richard Hamilton, a soldier in the last war, was buried with the usual honors from his late residence in Camden. Deceased was one of the survivors of the Albemarle, which was sunk by the rebels at Plymouth, North Carolina, October 24, 1864. He was rescued from drowning, and afterwards sent to the jail at Salisbury as a prisoner of war. The services were performed by Isaac S. Peacock of the Reformed Men's Home, of which deceased was a member, and the sermon was preached by Rev. Mr. Saulcup.

== See also ==
- List of American Civil War Medal of Honor recipients: G–L
- CSS Albemarle
