= Sharon Kantor =

Israeli windsurfer

Personal information
- Native name: שרון קנטור
- National team: Israel
- Born: 28 January 2003 (age 23) Avihayil, Israel

Sport
- Sport: Windsurfing
- Event: IQFoil
- Club: Michmoret Emek Hefer Sailing Club
- Coached by: Shahar Tzuberi
Medal record
Sailing
Representing Israel
Olympic Games
Silver medal – second place	2024 Paris	iQFoil
iQFoil World Championships
Gold medal – first place	2024 Lanzarote	iQFoil
Silver medal – second place	2026 Weymouth	iQFoil
iQFoil European Championships
Silver medal – second place	2023 Patras	iQFoil
- Updated on 3 August 2024

Sharon Kantor (Hebrew: שרון קנטור; born 28 January 2003) is an Israeli windsurfer. Competing in the IQFoil class, she won the silver medal at the 2023 European Championships, and the gold medal at the 2024 World Championships. Representing Israel at the 2024 Olympics, Kantor won the silver medal in the Women's iQFoil in Marseille, France.

== Early life ==
Kantor was born and raised in moshav Avihayil, and is Jewish. Her mother Nurith Dinte had moved to Israel from Australia, and her father Steven Kantor had moved to Israel from South Africa, both at five years of age. Her father, Steven, was the Israeli national squash champion, and for a decade was the chairman of the Israel Squash Association. Sharon is the middle child in her family, with two brothers and two sisters. She attended Ramot Yam High School in Michmoret, Israel, graduating with honors.

== Windsurfing career ==
Kantor belongs to the Michmoret Emek Hefer Sailing Club. She is coached by Israeli former Olympic windsurfing bronze medalist Shahar Tzuberi. She trains with the Israeli team primarily at Sdot Yam, and also trains in the Kinneret, Eilat, Kishon, Haifa, and Herzliya. Commenting on her approach to windsurfing competition, she said: "the most important thing for me has been to enjoy what I'm doing."

=== Early years; U17 World Championship bronze medalist ===
Kantor began windsurfing at the age of 10, participating in competitions at the age of 11, and at 13 won her first international title in a competition for youths under 15. In 2018 she won the European Under-17 Bic Techno Championship in Athens, Greece, and then the same year won a bronze medal in the Techno 293 World Championships in the under-17 category in Liepāja, Latvia.

=== 2023; European Championship silver medalist ===
In May 2023 Kantor represented Israel at the IQFoil European Championships, during which she won four races, and consequently won a silver medal. She also won a silver medal in the under-21 category. Kantor won a bronze medal in January 2023 at the World Cup in the island of Lanzarote, Spain.

In July 2023 she won a gold medal at the pre-Olympic competition in Marseille, France. In December, at the last World Series competition before the World Championships, in Lanzarote Kantor won a gold medal after leading the 72-competitor field from day 1. She defeated two fellow Israeli sailors, Tamar Steinberg who won the silver medal, and formerly Olympian Katy Spychakov who won the bronze medal, for an all-Israel podium.

=== 2024; World Champion and Olympic silver medalist ===
At the 2024 iQFoil World Championships held in Lanzarote, Canary Islands, in February, the 21-year-old Kantor won the gold medal, ahead of Emma Wilson from Britain and Katy Spychakov from Israel. Following her victory, it was decided that she will represent Israel at the 2024 Paris Olympics. She said: "Standing on that podium, draped in the Israeli flag alongside my fellow competitor Katy Spychakov, was a moment of pure elation and fulfillment." Commenting on how the Gaza war impacted her preparation, she said: "At the beginning of the war, it was very difficult to concentrate on training, and not let what was happening interfere. If I represent the country - that's my mission."

Representing Israel at the 2024 Summer Olympics, Kantor won the silver medal in the Women's iQFoil. She is Israel's first female Olympic medalist in sailing.

== See also ==
- List of European Championships medalists in sailing
- List of Jews in sailing
- List of Jewish Olympic medalists
- List of iQFoil Windsurfing World Championships medalists
