= Natasa Lappa =

Cypriot windsurfer (born 2001)

Personal information
- Nationality: Cypriot
- Born: 2 October 2001 (age 23); Limassol, Cyprus
- Height: 172 cm (5 ft 8 in)

Sailing career
- Class(es): RS:X, IQFOiL
- Club: Limassol Nautical Club

Achievements and titles
- Olympic finals: 21st

Natasa Lappa (Greek: Νατάσα Λάππα, born 2 October 2001) is a Cypriot windsurfer and sailor.

She represented Cyprus in the 2020 Tokyo Summer Olympics, one of 15 Cypriot athletes competing in the Games that year. She ranked 21st in the RS:X Women windsurfing event.

She is a member of The Limassol Nautical Club.
