= Aikaterini Divari =

Greek windsurfer

Katerina Divari
Personal information
- Full name: Aikaterini Divari
- Nationality: Greece
- Born: 8 March 2000 (age 26) Athens, Greece
- Height: 1.64 m (5 ft 5 in)
- Weight: 59 kg (130 lb)

Sailing career
- Sport: Sailing
- Club: NSC Vari Varkiza
- Coached by: Jean-Marc Fantis
- Class: Sailboard

Aikaterini "Katerina" Divari (Greek: Αικατερίνη "Κατερινα" Διβαρη; born 8 March 2000) is a Greek windsurfer, who specialized in Neil Pryde RS:X class. She finished in the Techno 293 class at the 2018 Summer Youth Olympics in Buenos Aires, Argentina, and also represented her country Greece on her senior windsurfing debut at the rescheduled Tokyo 2020, landing in the nineteenth position. A member of Nautical Sports Club at Vari Varkiza, Divari trained most of her competitive sporting career under the tutelage of her personal coach Jean-Marc Fantis.

Divari made her international debut, as an eighteen-year-old teen, at the 2018 Summer Youth Olympics in Buenos Aires, Argentina, sailing competitively in the girls' Techno 293+. There, she accumulated a net grade of 73 to obtain the fifth overall position at the end of the thirteen-race series, narrowly missing out on the podium by 27 points.

At the rescheduled 2020 Summer Olympics in Tokyo, Divari qualified for her maiden Greek team in the women's RS:X class. Building up to her Olympic selection, she finished eighteenth to secure the lone available berth offered at the 2020 RS:X Europeans in Vilamoura, Portugal. Divari clearly struggled to catch a large fleet of windsurfers from behind under breezy conditions with marks lower than fourteenth place at the end of twelve-race series, sitting her steadily in the nineteenth spot with 204 net points.
