= Nicolas Goyard =

French windsurfer

Personal information
- Nationality: French
- Born: 3 January 1996 (age 30) New Caledonia

Sport
- Sport: Sailing
- Event(s): PWA, Olympics, Défi wind

Nicolas Goyard (French pronunciation: [nikɔla ɡɔjaʁ]; born 3 January 1996) is a French competitive sailor.

In 2020, Nicolas joined the brand Phantom Foiling, where he revolutionized foil gear for windsurfing slalom and speeds. He was one of the pioneer who pushed high speeds in windfoil reaching unseen speeds in foil : 37.19 knots on 500 meters at the Prince of Speed 2021. His goal to reach 40 knots became reality when he was the first person sailing at 42 knots of speed at Fuerteventura in october 2023.

He qualified to represent France at the 2024 Summer Olympics in Paris 2024, competing in men's windsurfing. His brother Thomas Goyard was the Olympic silver medalist in the men's RS:X event at the 2020 Olympic Games.
