= Saskia Sills =

British windsurfer (born 1996)

Saskia Sills (born 24 July 1996 in Plymouth) is a world champion British windsurfer and member of the British Sailing Team. She has competed in international events such as the European championships, and has been part of the British Sailing team from 2013 to present as a windsurfer initially in the RS:X (Women) Class, and more recently in the IQFoil class.

== Debut ==
Sills started sailing in 2004 at Roadford Lake Sailing Club. She won the World Championship title at age 13, and continued on to win it again on her 15th birthday. She won it twice when she was aged 16. She received the Young Sailor of the Year award in 2012 at the London International Boat Show from YJA.

== Current campaign ==
Saskia, and her twin Imogen lived in Portland, where they trained at the Weymouth and Portland National Sailing Academy. Saskia now lives in Israel with her boyfriend Israeli windsurfer Tom Reuveny, and trains with the Israeli national teams under Israeli coach and former Olympic medalist Shahar Tzuberi.

Their brother Sam Sills is also a windsurfer. He competed in the 2024 Summer Olympics event, reaching 5th place and losing to Israeli windsurfer Tom Reuveny, who was Saskia's boyfriend at the time.

== Awards ==
Nominated for BBC Young Sports Personality of the Year in 2012, Saskia was chosen for her gold in the ISAF Youth World Championship and at the EUROSAF Youth Europeans, continuing on to claim the under-17 world title at the RSX Open Youth World Championships. She was nominated alongside Olympic and Paralympic medalists for the ISAF Rolex World Sailor of the Year Awards.

Her Bournemouth University awards received include University Colours, and a nomination for Sportswoman of the Year.
