= Hélène Noesmoen =

French windsurfer

Personal information
- Born: 31 December 1992 (age 33) Les Sables-d'Olonne, France

Sailing career
- Sport: Sailing
- Classes: Techno 293; RS:X; IQFoil
Medal record
Representing France
Sailing World Cup
Gold medal – first place	2018 Miami	RS:X
IQFoil European Championships
Gold medal – first place	2020 Silvaplana	IQFoil
Gold medal – first place	2021 Marseille	IQFoil
Gold medal – first place	2022 Torbole	IQFoil
IQFoil World Championships
Gold medal – first place	2021 Silvaplana	IQFoil

Hélène Noesmoen (born 31 December 1992) is a French windsurfer who competes in the IQFoil class. She won the women's events at the 2021 IQFoil World Championships and the 2020, 2021 and 2022 IQFoil European Championships. Noesmoen also won the RS:X event at the 2018 Sailing World Cup in Miami, and multiple junior world championships.

== Personal life ==
Noesmoen is from Les Sables-d'Olonne, France. She started windsurfing at a young age, initially with an RS:X. Her father Yves runs l'Ecole Nationale de Voile et des Sports Nautiques (National School of Sailing and Water Sports), and her two brothers and one sister have also won European windsurfing medals. Noesmoen has a degree in civil and municipal engineering from the US Intelligence and National Security Alliance.

== Career ==
Noesmoen won junior championships in the Techno 293 class in 2007 and 2008, and in the RS:X classification in 2012. She won the women's RS:X competition at the 2018 Sailing World Cup event in Miami. In 2020, she started training in Marseille, where the sailing events at the 2024 Summer Olympics were to be held. That year she won the Formula Foil World Championships, and the IQFoil European Championships.

Noesmoen won the 2021 IQFoil World Championships, which was the first time the competition had been held. She also won the 2021 IQFoil European Championships.

In 2022, she won the IQFoil European Championships for the third time. That year, she also won the IQFoil event at the 2022 Mediterranean Games, the Trofeo Princesa Sofía competition, the IQFoil European Championships at Lake Garda, and the Semaine Olympique Française competition. Going into the IQFoil World Championships event in Brest, France, Noesmoen was unbeaten in 2022. She finished 15th in the championships, and did not win any individual events.

In February 2024, Noesmoen was selected for the 2024 Summer Olympics, where she came 7th.

== See also ==
- List of European Championships medalists in sailing
- List of iQFoil Windsurfing World Championships medalists
