= Islay Watson =

British female windsurfer

- Born: October 15, 2000 (age 26); Aviemore
- Known for: Windsurfing

Islay Watson (born 15 October 2000) is a Scottish female windsurfer. She won two silver medals at the IQFoil European Championships in 2020 and 2021.

== Life ==
Watson was born in Aviemore in Scotland in 2000. Her sister Erin Watson is also a competitive surfer who became the RS:X youth national champion.

In 2017, she and her sister were both commuting to the National Sailing Academy in Weymouth, Dorset. They were both invited to meet the tennis star Andy Murray at a charity event he was organising in Glasgow. She and her sister got to meet Andy and his brother Jamie. She and Erin were given tips by Judy Murray.

In 2018, she was in Texas at the Youth Sailing World Championships where she won a gold medal. TeamGB also named her and Taekwondo expert Aaliyah Powell to join the 40plus team representing the UK at the 2018 Youth Olympics in Buenos Aires.

She won a silver medals at the first ever IQFoil European Championships in August 2020 on Lake Silvaplana in Switzerland. Helene Noesmoen won the gold medal and the Dutch windsurfer Lilian de Geus was third. Later at Lake Garda in Italy she competed at the first ever iQFOiL International Games. She was the highest placed Briton and she took the first ever gold medal in the under-21 category.

In 2021, the European championships were in Marseilles. The winner, Helene Noesmoen, was the same as 2020 and Watson again took the silver. The bronze medal was won by the Israeli Shachar Reshef.

At the iQFOiL World Championships in Lanzarote in the Canary Islands, Watson was 20th and the second highest placed British woman. However, Emma Wilson took silver and she was the chosen entry for the UK at the Olympics that year.
