= Tamar Steinberg =

Israeli windsurfer

Tamar Steinberg תמר שטיינברג
Personal information
- Native name: תמר שטיינברג
- National team: Israel
- Born: 21 August 2006 (age 20) Nahsholim, Israel

Sport
- Sport: Windsurfing
- Event: IQFoil
- Club: Sdot Yam Sailing Club
- Coached by: Shahar Tzuberi
Medal record
Sailing
Representing Israel
iQFoil World Championships
Gold medal – first place	2026 Weymouth	iQFoil
Silver medal – second place	2025 Aarhus	iQFoil
iQFoil European Championships
Gold medal – first place	2026 Portimão	iQFoil
- Updated on 13 September 2026

Tamar Steinberg (Hebrew: תמר שטיינברג; born 21 August 2006) is an Israeli windsurfer. Competing in the IQFoil class, she is the 2026 world champion. At the 2025 World Championships she won the silver medal.
