= Techno 293 =

Type of windsurfer

Development
- Design: One Design

Boat
- Crew: 1

Hull
- Type: Sailboard
- Hull weight: 13 kg (29 lb)
- LOA: 293 cm (115 in)
- Beam: 79 cm (31 in)

Rig
- Mast height: 430 cm (170 in)

Sails
- Mainsail area: 5.8 m2 (U13); 6.8 m2 (U15); 7.8 m2 (U17); 8.5 m2 (Senior)

The Techno 293 is a development of the Aloha class and is primarily for the youth windsurfing class. The class is recognised by the International Sailing Federation. The design was chosen to be the windsurfer for the Youth Olympic Games.

== Events ==
=== World Championships ===
The Techno 293 World Championships have been held annually since 2006.

=== Youth Olympics ===
The class has been used at the Youth Olympics
