= IQFoil =

Windsurfing class

iQFOiL
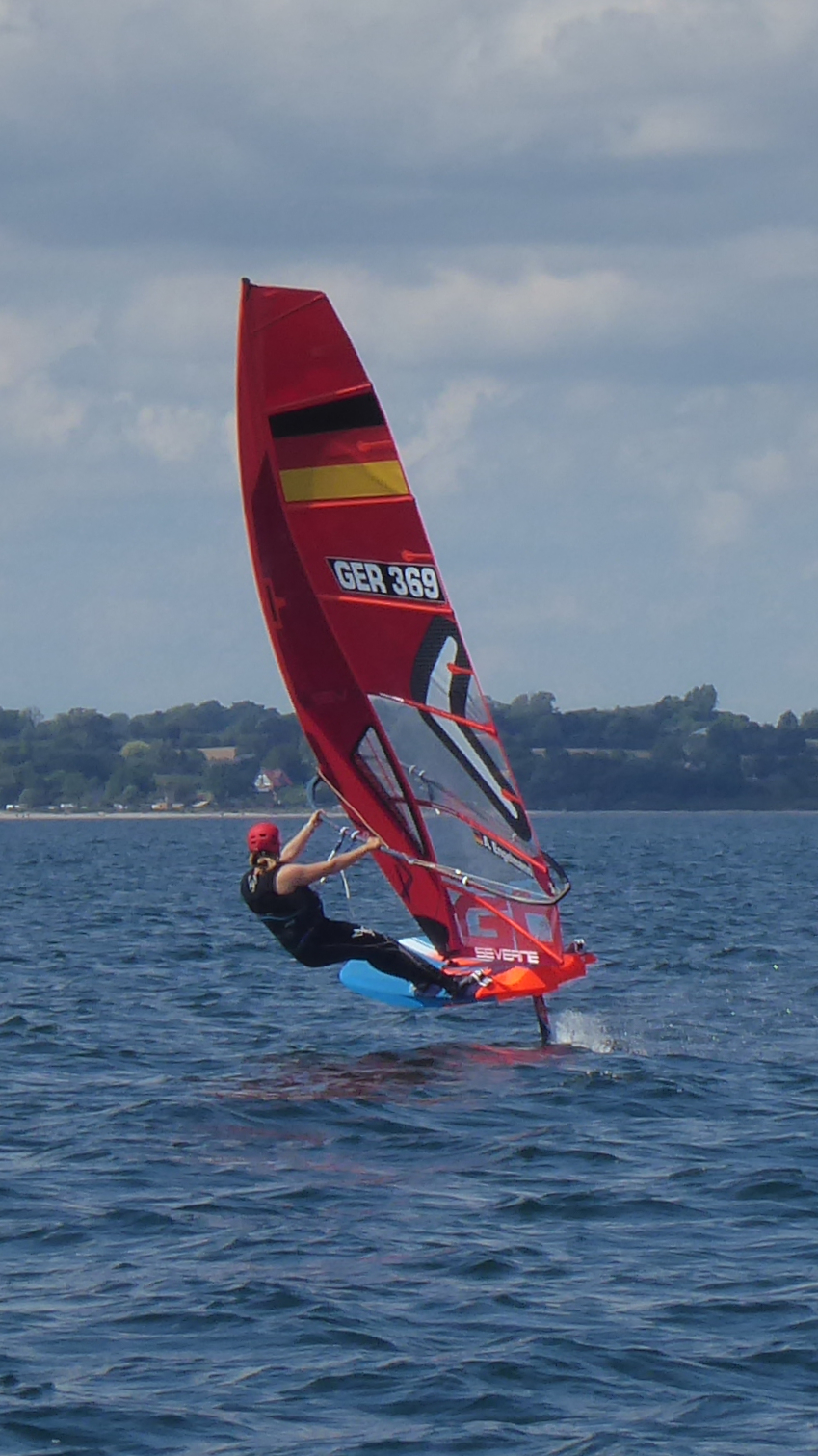

Development
- Designer: Tiesda You
- Year: 2018
- Design: One Design
- Name: iQFOiL

Boat
- Crew: 1

Hull
- Type: Sailboard
- Hull weight: 11.25 kg (24.8 lb); Volume 196 L (43 imp gal; 52 US gal)
- LOA: 2.2 m (7 ft 3 in)
- Beam: 0.95 m (3 ft 1 in)

Rig
- Mast height: male: 4.9 m (16 ft) female: 4.9 m (16 ft)

Sails
- Mainsail area: male: 8.0 m^{2} (86 sq ft) female: 7.3 m^{2} (79 sq ft)

iQFOiL is a windsurfing class selected by World Sailing to replace the RS:X for the 2024 Summer Olympics. The discipline has similarities to Formula Windsurfing, however a notable difference is that sailors only use one sail. The sail size was originally 9 m^{2} for the men and 8 m^{2} for the women. The rider has a choice between using a hydrofoil or a conventional 68 cm fin.

== Equipment Evolution ==
Starting in January 2025 there are equipment changes:

- Men will switch from the 9 m^{2} sail to an 8 m^{2} (previous Female and Youth design) sail.
- Female and Female Youth change from the 8 m^{2} sail to a new design 7.3 m^{2} sail.
- Both categories adopt the existing 4.90 m mast to align with the revised sail sizes.

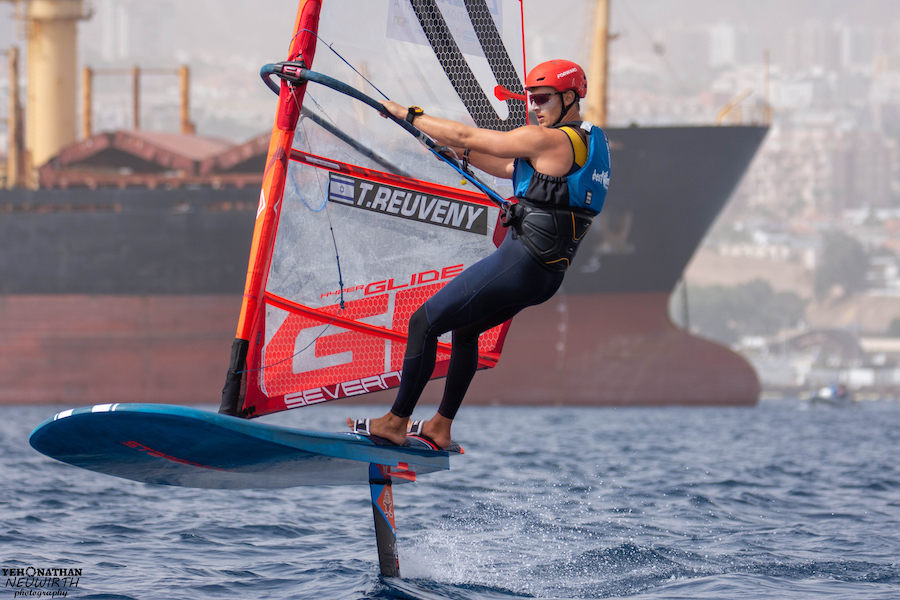
2024 Olympics gold medalist Tom Reuveny

== Events ==
=== World Championships ===
- iQFOiL World Championships
- iQFOiL Youth World Championships
- Youth Sailing World Championships

=== Olympics ===
- Sailing at the 2024 Summer Olympics – Men's iQFoil
- Sailing at the 2024 Summer Olympics – Women's iQFoil

== See also ==
- Windfoiling
- RS:X
