= List of flag bearers for the Netherlands Antilles at the Olympics =

Netherlands Antilles at the Olympics
- Flag of the Netherlands Antilles
- IOC code: AHO
- NOC: Nederlands Antilliaans Olympisch Comité
- Website: www.sports.an (in English)
- Medals: Gold 0 Silver 1 Bronze 0 Total 1

Summer appearances
- 1952; 1956; 1960; 1964; 1968; 1972; 1976; 1980; 1984; 1988; 1992; 1996; 2000; 2004; 2008

Winter appearances
- 1988; 1992

Other related appearances
- Independent Olympic Athletes (2012); Aruba (2016–pres.); Netherlands (2016–pres.)

This is a list of flag bearers who have represented Netherlands Antilles at the Olympics.

Flag bearers carry the national flag of their country at the opening ceremony of the Olympic Games.

| # | Event year | Season | Flag bearer | Sport | Ref |
|---|---|---|---|---|---|
| 1 | 1972 | Summer | Bèto Adriana | Shooting | |
| 2 | 1984 | Summer | Evert Johan Kroon | Swimming | |
| 3 | 1988 | Winter | Bart Carpentier Alting | Luge | |
| 4 | 1988 | Summer | Jan Boersma | Sailing | |
| 5 | 1992 | Winter | Dudley den Dulk | Bobsleigh | |
| 6 | 1992 | Summer | Michel Daou | Shooting | |
| 7 | 1996 | Summer | Sergio Murray | Judo | |
| 8 | 2000 | Summer | Cor van Aanholt | Sailing | |
| 9 | 2004 | Summer | Churandy Martina | Athletics | |
| 10 | 2008 | Summer | Churandy Martina | Athletics | |

== See also ==
- Netherlands Antilles at the Olympics
- List of flag bearers for Aruba at the Olympics
