= Netherlands Antilles at the 1996 Summer Olympics =

- Flag of the Netherlands Antilles
- IOC code: AHO
- NOC: Netherlands Antilles Olympic Committee
- Website: www.sports.an (in English)

in Atlanta
- Competitors: 6 in 5 sports
- Flag bearer: Sergio Murray
- Medals: Gold 0 Silver 0 Bronze 0 Total 0

Summer Olympics appearances (overview)
- 1952; 1956; 1960; 1964; 1968; 1972; 1976; 1980; 1984; 1988; 1992; 1996; 2000; 2004; 2008

Other related appearances
- Independent Olympic Athletes (2012); Aruba (2016–pres.); Netherlands (2016–pres.)

The Netherlands Antilles was represented at the 1996 Summer Olympics in Atlanta, Georgia, United States by the Netherlands Antilles Olympic Committee.

In total, six athletes – all men – represented the Netherlands Antilles in five different sports including athletics, judo, sailing, shooting and swimming.

== Background ==
The Netherlands Antilles Olympic Committee was recognised by the International Olympic Committee in 1950. The Netherlands Antilles made their Olympic debut at the 1952 Summer Olympics in Helsinki, Finland. They missed the 1956 Summer Olympics in Melbourne, Victoria, Australia but returned for the 1960 Summer Olympics in Rome, Italy and established themselves as a regular competitor at the Olympics thereafter. They appeared at every subsequent games except the 1980 Summer Olympics in Moscow, Russian Soviet Federative Socialist Republic, Soviet Union after taking part in the United States-led boycott. The 1996 Summer Olympics in Atlanta, Georgia, United States marked their 10th Olympic appearance.

== Competitors ==
In total, six athletes represented The Netherlands Antilles at the 1996 Summer Olympics in Atlanta, Georgia, United States across five different sports.

| Sport | Men | Women | Total |
|---|---|---|---|
| Athletics | 1 | 0 | 1 |
| Judo | 1 | 0 | 1 |
| Sailing | 2 | 0 | 2 |
| Shooting | 1 | 0 | 1 |
| Swimming | 1 | 0 | 1 |
| Total | 6 | 0 | 6 |

== Athletics ==
In total, one Netherlands Antillean athlete participated in the athletics events – Ellsworth Manuel in the men's long jump.

| Athlete | Event | Qualification | | Final | |
| Athlete | Event | Result | Rank | Result | Rank |
|---|---|---|---|---|---|
| Ellsworth Manuel | Long jump | NM | | did not advance | |

== Judo ==
In total, one Netherlands Antillean athlete participated in the judo events – Sergio Murray in the men's –86 kg category.

| Athlete | Event | Round of 64 | Round of 32 | Round of 16 | Quarterfinals | Semifinals | Repechage | | | Final | |
| Athlete | Event | Round of 64 | Round of 32 | Round of 16 | Quarterfinals | Semifinals | Round 1 | Round 2 | Round 3 | Final | |
| Athlete | Event | Opposition Result | Opposition Result | Opposition Result | Opposition Result | Opposition Result | Opposition Result | Opposition Result | Opposition Result | Opposition Result | Rank |
|---|---|---|---|---|---|---|---|---|---|---|---|
| Sergio Murray | –86 kg | Bye | Mashurenko (UKR); L | Did not advance | | | | | | | |

== Sailing ==
In total, two Netherlands Antillean athletes participated in the sailing events – Paul Dielemans in the laser and Constantino Saragoza in the men's mistral one design.

Men

| Athlete | Event | Race | | | | | | | | | Net points | Final rank |
| Athlete | Event | 1 | 2 | 3 | 4 | 5 | 6 | 7 | 8 | 9 | Net points | Final rank |
|---|---|---|---|---|---|---|---|---|---|---|---|---|
| Constantino Saragoza | Mistral One Design | ~~41~~ | 34 | 39 | ~~47~~ | 28 | 39 | 28 | 15 | 40 | 223 | 37 |

Open
Fleet racing

| Athlete | Event | Race | | | | | | | | | | | Net points | Final rank |
| Athlete | Event | 1 | 2 | 3 | 4 | 5 | 6 | 7 | 8 | 9 | 10 | 11 | Net points | Final rank |
|---|---|---|---|---|---|---|---|---|---|---|---|---|---|---|
| Paul Dielemans | Laser | 33 | 21 | 23 | ~~42~~ | 29 | 27 | 39 | 35 | 24 | 36 | ~~57~~ | 267 | 34 |

== Shooting ==
In total, one Netherlands Antillean athlete participated in the shooting events – Michel Daou in the men's trap and the men's double trap.

| Athlete | Event | Qualification | | Final | |
| Athlete | Event | Points | Rank | Points | Rank |
|---|---|---|---|---|---|
| Michel Daou | Trap | 114 | 49 | Did not advance | |
| Michel Daou | Double trap | 113 | 35 | Did not advance | |

== Swimming ==
In total, one Netherlands Antillean athlete participated in the swimming events – Howard Hinds in the men's 50 m freestyle.

| Athlete | Event | Heats | | Final A/B | |
| Athlete | Event | Time | Rank | Time | Rank |
|---|---|---|---|---|---|
| Howard Hinds | 50 m freestyle | 24.63 | 54 | Did not advance | |

== See also ==
- Netherlands Antilles at the 1995 Pan American Games
