= Netherlands Antilles at the Olympics =

- Flag of the Netherlands Antilles
- IOC code: AHO
- NOC: Nederlands Antilliaans Olympisch Comité
- Website: www.sports.an (in English)
- Medals Ranked 137th: Gold 0 Silver 1 Bronze 0 Total 1

Summer appearances
- 1952; 1956; 1960; 1964; 1968; 1972; 1976; 1980; 1984; 1988; 1992; 1996; 2000; 2004; 2008

Winter appearances
- 1988; 1992

Other related appearances
- Independent Olympic Athletes (2012); Aruba (2016–pres.); Netherlands (2016–pres.)

The Netherlands Antilles participated at the Olympic Games from 1952 until 2008. As a constituent country of the Kingdom of the Netherlands, it supported the Netherlands' boycott of the 1956 Games and also joined the American-led boycott of the 1980 Summer Olympics. The Netherlands Antilles participated in the Winter Olympic Games twice.

The National Olympic Committee for the Netherlands Antilles was created in 1931 and recognized by the International Olympic Committee from 1950 until 2011 upon the dissolution of the Netherlands Antilles. At the 2012 Olympics, participants from the five islands competed as independent athletes under the Olympic flag.

== History ==
=== Consisting entities ===
- Aruba (until 1986)
- Curaçao
- Sint Maarten
- Bonaire
- Sint Eustatius
- Saba

The Netherlands Antilles was established on 15 December 1954 from the former Dutch Colony of Curaçao and Dependencies. However, the Netherlands Antilles Olympic Committee was founded earlier, on 23 March 1931. It joined the Central American and Caribbean Sports Organization in 1938 and the Pan American Sports Organization in 1951. Recognized by the International Olympic Committee in 1950, the Netherlands Antilles debuted at the 1952 Summer Olympics in Helsinki two years later.

Aruba left the Netherlands Antilles in 1986 to become a constituent country within the Kingdom of the Netherlands. Since then, their athletes have competed separately under their own Olympic banner. The Netherlands Antilles first competed at the 1988 Winter Olympics in Calgary, Canada, without notable success. A similar outcome followed at the 1992 Winter Olympics in Albertville.

After the dissolution of the Netherlands Antilles on 10 October 2010, Bonaire, Sint Eustatius and Saba became part of the Netherlands as special municipalities of the Netherlands. Curaçao and Sint Maarten became separate constituent countries of the Kingdom of the Netherlands. In 2016, athletes from these five islands will have the choice to compete either with the Netherlands Olympic team or Aruba's.

All the above are collectively called "Dutch Caribbean".

=== Flags ===
Six-star flag of the Netherlands Antilles (until 1985). The six stars represents the six islands of the Netherlands Antilles.

Five-star flag of the Netherlands Antilles (since 1986 until dissolution). Because Aruba separated from the Netherlands Antilles, only five stars are left on the flag.

Three participants from the five islands of the former Netherlands Antilles can compete as independent athletes at the 2012 Summer Olympics. They used the Olympic Flag.

=== Dissolution of the Netherlands Antilles ===
Logo of the Netherlands Antilles Olympic Committee

Following the dissolution of the Netherlands Antilles, the Netherlands Antilles Olympic Committee was no longer recognised as a National Olympic Committee. At the 2012 Olympics, participants from the five islands competed as independent athletes under the Olympic flag. Three athletes from the former Netherlands Antilles participated as part of the team of Independent Athletes: Liemarvin Bonevacia in the men's athletics (400m), Philipine van Aanholt in the women's sailing (laser radial class) and Reginald de Windt in the men's judo (81kg). All three are from Curaçao. Churandy Martina competed for the Netherlands. At the 2016 Olympics, Martina, Bonevacia, Hensley Paulina and Jean-Julien Rojer competed for the Netherlands while Van Aanholt competed for Aruba.

== Timeline of participation ==
Olympic Year/s	Teams		
1900–1952 W	Netherlands		
1952 S	Netherlands	Netherlands Antilles	
1956	Netherlands		
1960–1984	Netherlands	Netherlands Antilles	
1988–2008	Netherlands	Netherlands Antilles	Aruba
2012	Netherlands	as part of Netherlands / Independent Olympic Athletes	Aruba
2014–present	Netherlands		Aruba

== Overview of Olympic participation ==
=== Medals by Summer Games ===
Games	Athletes	Gold	Silver	Bronze	Total	Rank
(Finland) 1952 Helsinki	11	0	0	0	0	–
(Australia) 1956 Melbourne	did not participate					
(Italy) 1960 Rome	5	0	0	0	0	–
(Japan) 1964 Tokyo	4	0	0	0	0	–
1968 Mexico City	5	0	0	0	0	–
(West Germany) 1972 Munich	2	0	0	0	0	–
(Canada) 1976 Montreal	4	0	0	0	0	–
(Soviet Union) 1980 Moscow	boycotted					
(United States) 1984 Los Angeles	8	0	0	0	0	–
(South Korea) 1988 Seoul	3	0	1	0	1	36
(Spain) 1992 Barcelona	4	0	0	0	0	–
(United States) 1996 Atlanta	6	0	0	0	0	–
(Australia) 2000 Sydney	7	0	0	0	0	–
(Greece) 2004 Athens	3	0	0	0	0	–
(China) 2008 Beijing	3	0	0	0	0	–
(United Kingdom) 2012 London	as part of Independent Olympic Athletes					
2016–present	as part of Netherlands					
Total (13/30)	65	0	1	0	1	137

=== Medals by Winter Games ===
Games	Athletes	Gold	Silver	Bronze	Total	Rank
(Canada) 1988 Calgary	2	0	0	0	0	–
(France) 1992 Albertville	2	0	0	0	0	–
1994–2010	did not participate					
2014–present	as part of Netherlands					
Total (2/24)	4	0	0	0	0	–

=== Medals by summer sport ===
Sport	Gold	Silver	Bronze	Total
Sailing	0	1	0	1
Totals (1 entries)	0	1	0	1

==== Calgary 1988 ====
At the 1988 Winter Olympics in Calgary, Canada, the Netherlands Antilles was represented by two male athletes. They competed in two of the thirteen sports included in the International Olympic Committee's program. Bart Carpentier Alting and Bart Drechsel participated in bobsleigh in the men's two-man event, finishing 29th. Carpentier Alting also competed in luge in the men's singles event, placing 36th – the lowest ranked among classified competitors.

==== Albertville 1992 ====
At the 1992 Winter Olympics in Albertville, France, Bart Carpentier Alting returned, joined by Dudley den Dulk in the men's two-man bobsleigh event. They placed 37th out of 46 teams.

This marked the Netherlands Antilles' final Winter Olympics appearance.

==== Flag bearers ====
During the opening ceremony of the 1988 Winter Olympics in Calgary, bobsledder Bart Carpentier Alting served as the Netherlands Antilles' flag bearer. At the 1992 Winter Olympics in Albertville, bobsledder Dudley den Dulk carried the flag.

Year and location	Flag bearer	Discipline
Calgary 1988	Bart Carpentier Alting	Bobsleigh
Albertville 1992	Dudley den Dulk	Bobsleigh

==== Statistics by discipline ====
The Netherlands Antilles competed in bobsleigh at both Winter Olympics, represented by three athletes: Bart Drechsel, Dudley den Dulk, and Bart Carpentier Alting (twice). Their best bobsleigh result was 29th place at the 1988 Winter Olympics. They entered luge once, with Carpentier Alting finishing 36th in Calgary in 1988.

Discipline	Event	Athlete	Placement	
Discipline	Event	Athlete	Calgary 1988	Albertville 1992
Bobsleigh	Men's two-man	Bart Carpentier Alting	29th	–
Bobsleigh	Men's two-man	Bart Drechsel	29th	–
Bobsleigh	Men's two-man	Bart Carpentier Alting	–	37th
Bobsleigh	Men's two-man	Dudley den Dulk	–	37th
Luge	Men's singles	Bart Carpentier Alting	36th	–

== List of medalists ==
Jan Boersma was the only Netherlands Antillean athlete to win an Olympic medal, a silver medal in sailing in 1988. They nearly earned another silver in men's 200m in Beijing 2008. Churandy Martina finished second, behind Usain Bolt but was disqualified after an American protest due to his running outside of his lane during the race. Martina's disqualification was appealed but was rejected by the Court of Arbitration for Sport on March 6, 2009.

Medal	Name	Games	Sport	Event	
Silver	Jan Boersma	1988 Seoul	Sailing	Men's Division II	Netherlands Antilles
Gold	Odile van Aanholt	2024 Paris	Sailing	Female - 49erFX	Netherlands

== See also ==
- Aruba at the Olympics
- Category:Olympic competitors for the Netherlands Antilles
- Tropical nations at the Winter Olympics
