= Netherlands Antilles at the 2000 Summer Olympics =

- Flag of the Netherlands Antilles
- IOC code: AHO
- NOC: Netherlands Antilles Olympic Committee
- Website: www.sports.an (in English)

in Sydney
- Competitors: 7 in 6 sports
- Flag bearer: Cor van Aanholt
- Medals: Gold 0 Silver 0 Bronze 0 Total 0

Summer Olympics appearances (overview)
- 1952; 1956; 1960; 1964; 1968; 1972; 1976; 1980; 1984; 1988; 1992; 1996; 2000; 2004; 2008

Other related appearances
- Independent Olympic Athletes (2012); Aruba (2016–); Netherlands (2016–)

The Netherlands Antilles was represented at the 2000 Summer Olympics in Sydney, New South Wales, Australia by the Netherlands Antilles Olympic Committee.

Sydney 2000 marked the first time the Dutch Antillean Olympic team competed in Australia as the Netherlands Antilles supported the Netherlands and other European nations boycott of the 1956 Summer Olympics in Melbourne due to the Soviet invasion of Hungary but its sister nation, the Netherlands did take part in the Equestrian events at the 1956 Summer Olympics in Stockholm five months earlier.

In total, seven athletes including six men and one woman represented the Netherlands Antilles in six different sports including athletics, equestrian, sailing, shooting, swimming and triathlon.

== Background ==
The Netherlands Antilles Olympic Committee was recognised by the International Olympic Committee in 1950. The Netherlands Antilles made their Olympic debut at the 1952 Summer Olympics in Helsinki, Finland. They missed the 1956 Summer Olympics in Melbourne, Victoria, Australia but returned for the 1960 Summer Olympics in Rome, Italy and established themselves as a regular competitor at the Olympics thereafter. They appeared at every subsequent games except the 1980 Summer Olympics in Moscow, Russian Soviet Federative Socialist Republic, Soviet Union after taking part in the United States-led boycott. The 2000 Summer Olympics in Sydney, New South Wales, Australia marked their 11th Olympic appearance.

== Competitors ==
In total, seven athletes represented the Netherlands Antilles at the 2000 Summer Olympics in Sydney, New South Wales, Australia across six different sports.

Sport	Men	Women	Total
Athletics	1	1	2
Equestrian	1	0	1
Sailing	1	0	1
Shooting	1	0	1
Swimming	1	0	1
Triathlon	1	0	1
Total	6	1	7

== Athletics ==
In total, two Netherlands Antillean athletes participated in the athletics events – Caimin Douglas in the men's 100 m and Florencia Hunt in the women's 800 m.

Athlete	Event	Heat		Quarterfinal		Semifinal		Final	
Athlete	Event	Time	Rank	Time	Rank	Time	Rank	Time	Rank
Caimin Douglas	Men's 100 m	10.69	7	Did not advance					
Florencia Hunt	Women's 800 m	2:03.78	7	Did not advance					

== Equestrian ==
In total, one Netherlands Antillean athlete participated in the equestrian events – Eduard Stibbe in the eventing individual.

Athlete	Horse	Event	Dressage		Cross-country		Show jumping		Total	
Athlete	Horse	Event	Penalties	Rank	Penalties	Rank	Penalties	Rank	Penalties	Rank
Eduard Stibbe	Eton	Eventing Individual	53.8	=27	4.8	15	13.0	=20	71.6	13

== Sailing ==
In total, one Netherlands Antillean athlete participated in the sailing events – Cor van Aanholt in the men's mistral.

Athlete	Event	Race											Net points	Rank
Athlete	Event	1	2	3	4	5	6	7	8	9	10	11	Net points	Rank
Cor van Aanholt	Men's Mistral	34	28	~~44~~; ~~OCS~~	38	35	~~41~~	21	36	8	37	23	260	36

== Swimming ==
In total, one Netherlands Antillean athlete participated in the swimming events – Anthony Ervin in the men's 50 m freestyle and the men's 100 m freestyle. Tessa Solomon was entered in the women's 100 m backstroke by did not compete.

Athlete	Event	Heat		Semifinal		Final	
Athlete	Event	Time	Rank	Time	Rank	Time	Rank
Anthony Ervin	Men's 50 m freestyle	24.07	52	Did not advance			
Anthony Ervin	Men's 100 m freestyle	52.52	51	Did not advance			
Tessa Solomon	Women's 100 m backstroke	Did not start		Did not advance			

== Triathlon ==
In total, one Netherlands Antillean athlete participated in the triathlon events – Roland Melis in the men's race.

Athlete	Event	Swim	Trans. 1	Cycle	Trans. 2	Run	Total	Rank
Roland Melis	Men's	19:21.19		1:02:47.80		34:02.96	1:56:11.95	45

== See also ==
- Netherlands Antilles at the 1999 Pan American Games
