= Netherlands Antilles at the 1988 Summer Olympics =

- Flag of the Netherlands Antilles
- IOC code: AHO
- NOC: Netherlands Antilles Olympic Committee

in Seoul
- Competitors: 3 in 3 sports
- Medals Ranked 36th: Gold 0 Silver 1 Bronze 0 Total 1

Summer Olympics appearances (overview)
- 1952; 1956; 1960; 1964; 1968; 1972; 1976; 1980; 1984; 1988; 1992; 1996; 2000; 2004; 2008

Other related appearances
- Independent Olympic Athletes (2012); Aruba (2016–pres.); Netherlands (2016–pres.)

The Netherlands Antilles was represented at the 1988 Summer Olympics in Seoul, South Korea by the Netherlands Antilles Olympic Committee.

In total, three athletes including two men and one woman represented the Netherlands Antilles in three different sports including sailing, shooting and swimming.

The Netherlands Antilles won one medal at the games after Jan Boersma claimed silver in the sailing men's division II. It was the nation's first-ever Olympic medal.

== Background ==
The Netherlands Antilles Olympic Committee was recognised by the International Olympic Committee in 1950. The Netherlands Antilles made their Olympic debut at the 1952 Summer Olympics in Helsinki, Finland. They missed the 1956 Summer Olympics in Melbourne, Victoria, Australia but returned for the 1960 Summer Olympics in Rome, Italy and established themselves as a regular competitor at the Olympics thereafter. They appeared at every subsequent games except the 1980 Summer Olympics in Moscow, Russian Soviet Federative Socialist Republic, Soviet Union after taking part in the United States-led boycott. The 1988 Summer Olympics in Seoul, South Korea marked their eighth Olympic appearance. The Netherlands Antilles had never previously won an Olympic medal.

== Competitors ==
In total, three athletes represented the Netherlands Antilles at the 1988 Summer Olympics in Seoul, South Korea across three different sports.

Sport	Men	Women	Total
Sailing	1	0	1
Shooting	0	1	1
Swimming	1	0	1
Total	2	1	3

== Medalists ==
The Netherlands Antilles won one medal at the games after Jan Boersma claimed silver in the sailing men's division II. It was the nation's first-ever Olympic medal.

Medal	Name	Sport	Event	Date
Silver	Jan Boersma	Sailing	Men's Division II	27 September

== Sailing ==
In total, one Netherlands Antillean athlete participated in the sailing events – Jan Boersma in the men's division II.

Athlete	Event	Race							Net points	Final rank
Athlete	Event	1	2	3	4	5	6	7	Net points	Final rank
Jan Boersma	Division II	0	14	14	11.7	0	~~16~~	3	42.7	2nd place, silver medalist(s)

== Shooting ==
In total, one Netherlands Antillean athlete participated in the shooting events – Jeanne Lopes in the women's 10 m air rifle.

Athlete	Event	Qualification		Final	
Athlete	Event	Points	Rank	Points	Rank
Jeanne Lopes	10 m air rifle	364	45	Did not advance	

== Swimming ==
In total, one Netherlands Antillean athlete participated in the swimming events – Hilton Woods in the men's 50 metre freestyle and the men's 100 metre freestyle.

Athlete	Event	Heats		Final A/B	
Athlete	Event	Time	Rank	Time	Rank
Hilton Woods	50 metre freestyle	23.46	17 FB	23.65	16
Hilton Woods	100 metre freestyle	50.73	9 FB	51.25	16
