= Sunfish World Championship =

World Championship in Sailing

The Sunfish World Championship is an annual international sailing regatta of Sunfish dinghy, organized by the host club on behalf of the International Sunfish Class Association and recognized by World Sailing, the sport's IOC-recognized governing body.

== Events ==
Event			Host			Participation					Ref.
Ed.	Dates	Year	Host club	Location	Country	No.			Nat.	Cont	Ref.
1	13-15 Feb	1970	St. Thomas Yacht Club	Nazareth, Saint Thomas	United States Virgin Islands						
2	-	1971		Puerto Azul	Venezuela						
3	-	1972	Harrington Sound Sailing & G???? Club		Bermuda						
4	-	1973		Martinique							
5	-	1974	Sunfish Club Aruba		Aruba						
5	25Apr -2May	1974	Kings Bay Yacht & Country Club	King's Bay, Miami, FL	United States						
7	-	1976		Puerto Azul	Venezuela						
8	-	1977	Nassau Yacht Club	Nassau	Bahamas						
9	-	1978	Ponce Yacht and Fishing Club	Ponce	Puerto Rico						
10	-	1979	Royal Yacht Club Hollandia	Medemblik	Netherlands						
11	-	1980		Sunfish Club Aruba	Aruba						
12	-	1981		Baia Sardinia	Italy						
13	-	1982	Coyote Point Yacht Club	Coyote Point, San Mateo, California	United States						
14	-	1983		San Andres island	Colombia						
15	-	1984		Kingston, Ontario	Canada						
16	-	1985		Riccionne	Italy						
17	-	1986	Barrington Yacht Club	Barrington, Rhode Island	United States						
18	-	1987	Sunfish Club Aruba		Aruba						
19	-	1988		Montagu Bay	Bahamas						
N/A	-	1989	NOT HELD								
20	-	1990	Orlando Yacht Club	Orlando, FL	United States						
21	4-11 Aug	1991	Hotel Princess Beach	Curacao							
22	-	1992	Houston Yacht Club	La Porte, Harris County, Texas	United States						
23	2-9 Sep	1993	The Bitter End Yacht Club	Virgin Gorda	British Virgin Islands						
24	-	1994	Spanish Point Boat Club		Bermuda						
25	-	1995	Marsh Harbour Sailing Club		Bahamas						
26	-	1996	Club Nautica Boca Chica		Dominican Republic						
27	-	1997		Cartagena	Colombia						
28	-	1998	Sayville Yacht Club	Blue Point, Long Island, New York	United States						
29	-	1999	Ponce Yacht and Fishing Club	Ponce	Puerto Rico						
30	-	2000	Sarasota Sailing Squadron	Sarasota, Florida	United States						
31	-	2001	Sunsail Colonna Club	Colonna	Netherlands Antilles						
32	-	2002	Houston Yacht Club	La Porte, Harris County, Texas	United States						
33	-	2003	St Maarten Yacht Club	Philipsburg, Sint Maarten	Netherlands						
34	-	2004	Hyannis Yacht Club	Hyannis, Massachusetts	United States						
35	-	2005	Cercle Nautique de Schoelcher	Martinique							
36	-	2006	Charleston Harbor Resort and Marina	Charleston, SC	United States						
37	-	2007	Brant Beach Yacht Club	Long Beach, Ocean County, New Jersey	United States						
38	-	2008	Buffalo Canoe Club	Fort Erie, Ontario	Canada						
39	-	2009	Royal Nassau Sailing Club	Nassau, Bahamas	Bahamas						
40	-	2010	Centro Velico Punta Ala	Punta Ala	Italy						
41	-	2011	Lions Dive & Beach Resort	Curacao							
42	-	2012	St. Petersburg Yacht Club, Florida	St. Petersburg, Florida	United States						
43	-	2013	Lewes Yacht Club	Lewes	United States						
44	-	2014	Camp Sea Gull and Camp Seafarer	Arapahoe, NC	United States						
45	12-17 Oct	2015	Club de Regatas Lima, Yacht Club Peruano	Paracas	Peru						
46	21-27 Nov	2016	Club Naval	Cartagena	Colombia						
47	24Aug -1Sep	2017	Brant Beach Yacht Club	Long Beach, Ocean County, New Jersey	United States						
48	6-12 Oct	2018	Carolina Yacht Club, Wilmington	Wrightsville Beach, NC	United States						
49	14-20 Sep	2019	Bonaire Sailing Foundation	Bonaire							
N/A	18-24 Oct	2020	Sarasota Sailing Squadron	Sarasota, Florida	United States	CANCELLED DUE TO COVID					
50	23-29 Oct	2021	Sarasota Sailing Squadron	Sarasota, Florida	United States						
51	4-11 Sep	2022	Circolo Vela Torbole	Nago–Torbole, Lake Garda	Italy						
52	5-9 Dec	2023	Coconut Grove Sailing Club	Miami, Florida	United States						
53	12-18 Oct	2024	Rush Creek Yacht Club	Heath, Rockwall, Texas	United States	100	82	18	14	3	
54	4-7 Dec	2025	Salinas Yacht Club	Salinas	Ecuador	84					

== Multiple World champions ==
Compiled from the table below upto and including 2024.

Ranking	Sailor	Gold	Silver	Bronze	Total	No. Entries (1)
1	Eduardo Cordero (VEN)	8	2	0	10	12
2	Malcolm Smith (BER)	3	5	2	10	31
3	Jean Paul De Trazegnies (PER)	3	2	1	6	13
4	Donald Martinborough (BAH)	3	0	0	3	30
4	David Loring (USA)	3	0	0	3	5
6	Dave Chapin (USA)	2	2	1	5	5
7	Jonathan Martinetti (ECU)	2	1	0	3	10
7	Derrick Fries (USA)	2	1	0	3	8
7	Alexander Zimmerman (PER)	3	1	0	4	7
10	Alonso Collantes De Riglos (PER)	2	1	1	4	8
11	Scott Kyle (USA)	2	0	1	3	5
12	Pierre Siegenthaler (BAH)	2	0	0	2	6

(1)full results for some early years are not available so this may be an under estimate

== Medalists ==
Year	Gold	Silver	Bronze	Ref.
1970	Garry Hoyt (ISV)	Mike Shaw (ISV)	Chuck Millican (USA)	
1971	Ted Moore (USA)	Bob Bowles (USA)	Garry Hoyt (USA)	
1972	Bob Bowles (USA)	Carl Knight (USA)	Ted Moore (USA)	
1973	Pierre Siegenthaler (BAH)	Gert-Jan Zeestraten (NED)	Phillip Dunkley (BAH)	
1974	Serge Marsolle (GUA)	Maurice Ozier-La Fontaine (FRA)	Claude De Laval (FRA)	
1975	Derrick Fries (USA)	Paul Fendler (USA)	Michael Catalano (USA)	
1976	Paul Fendler (USA)	Michael Catalano (USA)	Juan Carlos Plaza (COL)	
1977	Pierre Siegenthaler (BAH)	John Dunkley (USA)	Raymond Marsolle (25x17px)	
1978	Derrick Fries (USA)	Dave Chapin (USA)	Peter Holmberg (ISV)	
1979	Dave Chapin (USA)	Cor Van Aanholt (AHO)	Paul Fendler (USA)	
1980	Cor Van Aanholt (AHO)	Dave Chapin (USA)	Raymond Marsolle (25x17px)	
1981	Dave Chapin (USA)	Alan Scharfe (USA)	Cor Van Aanholt (AHO)	
1982	John Kostecki (USA)	Derrick Fries (USA)	Dave Chapin (USA)	
1983	Donald Martinborough (BAH)	Alan Scharfe (USA)	Alan Beckwith (USA)	
1984	Andy Pimental (USA)	Mark May (USA)	Len Ruby (USA)	
1985	Donald Martinborough (BAH)	Scott Greenbaum (USA)	Bruce Sutphen (USA)	
1986	Scott Kyle (USA)	Andy Pimental (USA)	Doug Kaukeinen (USA)	
1987	Bruce Sutphen (USA)	Malcolm Smith (BER)	Stephen Smeulders (NED)	
1988	Donald Martinborough (BAH)	Chris Williams (USA)	James Lowe (BAH)	
1989	NOT HELD			
1990	Scott Kyle (USA)	Len Ruby (USA)	Mark May (USA)	
1991	Stephen Smeulders (NED)	Paul-Jon Patin (USA)	Scott Kyle (USA)	
1992	Paul-Jon Patin (USA)	Bob Findlay (USA)	Malcolm Smith (BER)	
1993	Eduardo Cordero (VEN)	Malcolm Smith (BER)	Jeff Linton (USA)	
1994	Malcolm Smith (BER)	Eduardo Cordero (VEN)	Paul-Jon Patin (USA)	
1995	David Loring (USA)	Eduardo Cordero (VEN)	Paul-Jon Patin (USA)	
1996	Eduardo Cordero (VEN)	Malcolm Smith (BER)	Jeff Linton (USA)	
1997	Eduardo Cordero (VEN)	Malcolm Smith (BER)	Cor van Aanholt (AHO)	
1998	Malcolm Smith (BER)	Paul Jon Patin (USA)	Cor van Aanholt (AHO)	
1999	Eduardo Cordero (VEN)	Andreas Flebbe (VEN)	Paul Jon Patin (USA)	
2000	Eduardo Cordero (VEN)	Oskar Johansson (CAN)	Jeff Linton (USA)	
2001	Eduardo Cordero (VEN)	Carl James (ANT)	Eduardo Gonzáles (VEN)	
2002	Eduardo Cordero (VEN)	John Kolius (USA)	Malcolm Smith (BER)	
2003	Malcolm Smith (BER)	Hank Saurage (USA)	Diego Zimmermann (PER)	
2004	Eduardo Cordero (VEN)	Jeff Linton (USA)	Paul Jon Patin (USA)	
2005	Lucas González (ARG)	Marx Chirinos (VEN)	David Mendelblatt (USA)	
2006	David Loring (USA)	David Mendelblatt (USA)	Thomas Whitehurst (USA)	
2007	Sebastian Mera (DOM)	Malcolm Smith (BER)	Paul-Jon Patin (USA)	
2008	Paul Foerster (USA)	Marx Chirinos (VEN)	Juan José Delgado (GUA)	
2009	David Loring (USA)	Paul-Jon Patin (USA)	David Mendelblatt (USA)	
2010	Jonathan Martinetti (ECU)	David Mendelblatt (USA)	Ard van Aan Holt (AHO)	
2011	Matheus Dellagnelo (BRA)	Alexander Zimmermann (PER)	Francisco Renna (ARG)	
2012	Alexander Zimmermann (PER)	Andrey Quintero (COL)	David Mendelblatt (USA)	
2013	Alexander Zimmermann (PER)	Paul-Jon Patin (USA)	David Mendelblatt (USA)	
2014	Francisco Renna (ARG)	Jean Paul de Trazegnies (PER)	Conner Blouin (USA)	
2015	Alexander Zimmermann (PER)	David Gonzalez (VEN)	Paul-Jon Patin (USA)	
2016	Alonso Collantes (PER)	Édgar Diminich (ECU)	David Mendelblatt (USA)	
2017	Alonso Collantes (PER)	Eugene Schmitt (USA)	Édgar Diminich (ECU)	
2018	Jean Paul de Trazegnies (PER)	Alonso Collantes (PER)	David Hernandez (GUA)	
2019	David Hernandez (GUA)	Renzo Sanguineti (PER)	Alonso Collantes (PER)	
2020	CANCELLED DUE TO COVID			
2021	Jonathan Martinetti (ECU)	Jean Paul de Trazegnies (PER)	Conner Blouin (USA)	
2022	Jean Paul de Trazegnies (PER)	David Hernandez (GUA)	Juan I. Maegli (GUA)	
2023	Jean Paul de Trazegnies (PER)	Jonathan Martinetti (ECU)	Conner Blouin (USA)	
2024	Conner Blouin (USA)	Luke Ramsay (CAN)	Jean Paul de Trazegnies (PER)	
2025	Simon Gomez Ortiz (COL)	Jean Paul De Trazegnies (PER)	Sebastian Medina (PUR)	
