= Netherlands Antilles at the 2004 Summer Olympics =

- Flag of the Netherlands Antilles
- IOC code: AHO
- NOC: Nederlands Antilliaans Olympisch Comité
- Website: www.sports.an (in English)

in Athens
- Competitors: 3 in 2 sports
- Flag bearer: Churandy Martina
- Medals: Gold 0 Silver 0 Bronze 0 Total 0

Summer Olympics appearances (overview)
- 1952; 1956; 1960; 1964; 1968; 1972; 1976; 1980; 1984; 1988; 1992; 1996; 2000; 2004; 2008

Other related appearances
- Independent Olympic Athletes (2012); Aruba (2016–pres.); Netherlands (2016–pres.)

The Netherlands Antilles competed at the 2004 Summer Olympics in Athens, Greece, from 13 to 29 August 2004, sending track athletes Churandy Martina and Geronimo Goeloe and equestrian athlete Eddy Stibbe. The 2004 Games were the Netherlands Antilles' twelfth appearance in the Summer Olympics; they first competed at the 1952 Summer Olympics in Helsinki, Finland. Before the 2004 games, the Netherlands Antilles had won one medal, a silver in sailing at the 1988 Summer Olympics, by Jan Boersma. There were no Dutch Antillean medalists at the Athens Olympics, although Martina advanced to the quarterfinal round in his event. The Dutch Antillean flagbearer at the ceremonies was Churandy Martina.

== Background ==
The Netherlands Antilles were a union of five Caribbean islands–Curaçao, Bonaire, Sint Eustatius, Saba and Sint Maarten–that, together, constituted a portion of the Realm of the Netherlands alongside the Netherlands themselves and Aruba, and held approximately 300,000 residents. The political power of the Dutch colonies was centered at Willemstad, the capital of both Curaçao and of the Netherlands Antilles. The first Dutch Antillean delegation to compete was an eleven-man team that arrived at the 1952 Summer Olympics in Helsinki, Finland. Excluding 1956 and 1980, athletes from the Netherlands Antilles had participated at twelve summer games between 1952 and 2004. It had additionally competed at the Winter Olympics of 1988 and 1992. The first female Dutch Antillean Olympians competed at the 1968 Summer Olympics in Tokyo, Japan, and had only appeared sporadically between then and 2004 with the exception of in 1984, when female athletes comprised the majority of the Dutch Antillean delegation. The Netherlands Antilles experienced its greatest diversity of athletes at the 2000 Summer Olympics in Sydney, Australia, when athletes participated in six different sports.

There had been a single medalist from the Netherlands Antilles–Jan Boersma, a sailor, won the silver medal in his event at the 1988 Summer Olympics in Seoul, South Korea. Up to and including the Athens games, there have been no other medalists from the Dutch colonies. Three male athletes comprised the Dutch Antillean delegation at the Athens Olympics–Geronimo Goeloe and Churandy Martina in track events, and Eddy Stibbe in equestrianism. Martina carried the flag of the Netherlands Antilles at the ceremonies.

== Athletics ==
=== Men's 100 meters ===
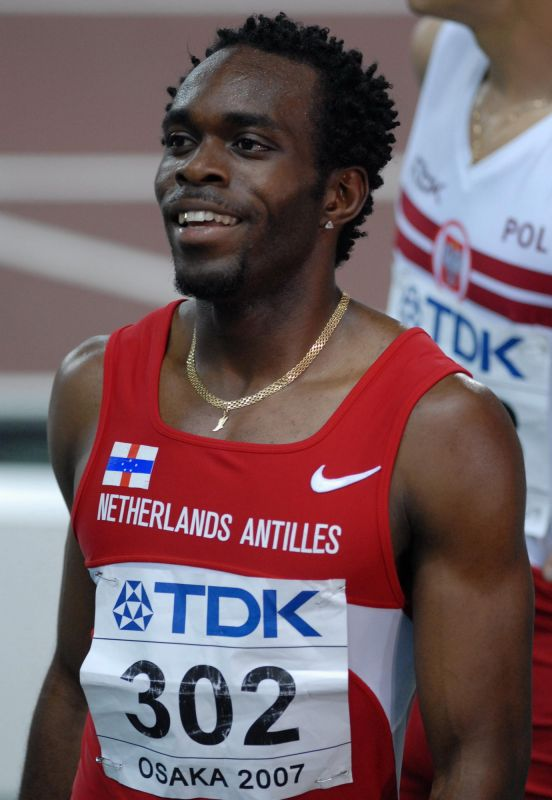
Churandy Martina first competed in the Olympics for the Netherlands Antilles at the 2004 Games.

Churandy Martina represented the Netherlands Antilles at the Athens Olympics in the men's 100 meters race. Born in Willemstad, the capital city of the island Curaçao, Martina was 20 years old upon his entrance to the 2004 Summer Olympics. He had not previously competed at any Olympic games. On August 21, Martina competed in the eighth heat, which included nine athletes. He finished the race in 10.23 seconds, placing in third ahead of Germany's Alexander Kosenkow (10.28 seconds) and behind Jamaica's Dwight Thomas (10.21 seconds). The heat itself was led by Maurice Greene of the United States. The Dutch Antillean progressed to the next round. During the course of the quarterfinals, which took place on the same day, Martina competed in the first heat against seven other athletes. This time, he finished in seventh place with a time of 10.24 seconds. Martina placed ahead of Brazil's André da Silva (10.34 seconds) and behind Canada's Pierre Browne in a heat led by national-record-setting Portuguese runner Francis Obikwelu (9.93 seconds) and season-best-setting British runner Mark Lewis-Francis (10.12 seconds). Churandy Martina did not advance to the semifinal rounds which took place the next day.

=== Men's 200 meters ===
Geronimo Goeloe also represented the Netherlands Antilles in track and field at the Athenian Olympics. He competed on the Dutch colony's behalf in the men's 200 meters race. Goeloe was born in Willemstad on Curaçao in 1981, making him 22 years old at the time of his competition at the Athens Olympics. Goeloe had not previously competed at any Olympic games. The qualification round of Goeloe's event took place on August 24. The Dutch Antillean was placed in the second heat, where he faced seven other athletes. Goeloe finished the event in 21.09 seconds, placing seventh out of eight athletes; Brazil's Basilio Emidio de Morais ranked behind him (21.14 seconds), and South Africa's Leigh Julius ranked directly ahead (20.80 seconds). The heat itself was led by the United States' Shawn Crawford (20.55 seconds) and Jamaica's Christopher Williams (20.57 seconds). Goeloe did not advance to the quarterfinal round.

Key

- Note–Ranks given for track events are within the athlete's heat only
- Q = Qualified for the next round
- q = Qualified for the next round as a fastest loser or, in field events, by position without achieving the qualifying target
- NR = National record
- N/A = Round not applicable for the event
- Bye = Athlete not required to compete in round

Men
Track & road events

Athlete	Event	Heat		Quarterfinal		Semifinal		Final	
Athlete	Event	Result	Rank	Result	Rank	Result	Rank	Result	Rank
Churandy Martina	100 m	10.23	3 Q	10.24	7	Did not advance			
Geronimo Goeloe	200 m	21.09	7	Did not advance					

== Equestrian ==
=== Eventing ===
Eduard Peter Nicolaas Stibbe, known also as Eddy Stibbe, competed for the Netherlands Antilles as its only equestrian athlete. Stibbe competed in individual eventing. Born in 1948 in 's-Hertogenbosch, Stibbe first competed, aged 23, in the 1972 Summer Olympics in Munich, West Germany, riding the horse Autumn Flash and representing the Netherlands. He returned at the age of 43 to the 1992 Summer Olympics in Barcelona, Spain, riding Olympic Bahlua on the Netherlands' behalf. At age 51, Stibbe represented the Netherlands Antilles for the first time at the 2000 Summer Olympics in Sydney, Australia on horse Eton, finishing his event for the first time. He returned again to the Olympics at the age of 55, riding horse Dusky Moon, for his fourth Olympic appearance and sixth Olympic event. On August 16, Stibbe faced 74 other athletes during the dressage portion of the event. The Dutch Antillean competitor accrued 57.80 penalty points but was awarded 62.40 points by one judge and 61.20 points by another, tying Jaroslav Hatla of the Czech Republic for 38th place. During the August 17 cross-country phase of the event, Stibbe accrued 49.20 penalty points (20 from jumping, 29.20 from time), finishing the race in 10:59. This placed him at 60th place of the 71 athletes who advanced to the cross-country round. Overall, at this point, Eddy Stibbe's combined point values placed him at 58th place.

On 23 August, Eddy Stibbe competed in the qualification round of the event's jumping phase. He accrued eight penalty points as a result of jumping errors, and four points as a result of time penalties. Stibbe placed 25th out of the 68 athletes finishing this phase of the event, and placed 53rd overall when combining all scores. The Dutch-born athlete did not qualify for the final round of the jumping set of the event.

Athlete	Horse	Event	Dressage		Cross-country			Jumping						Total	
Athlete	Horse	Event	Dressage		Cross-country			Qualifier			Final			Total	
Athlete	Horse	Event	Penalties	Rank	Penalties	Total	Rank	Penalties	Total	Rank	Penalties	Total	Rank	Penalties	Rank
Eddy Stibbe	Dusky Moon	Individual	57.80	=38	49.20	107.00	58	8.00	115.00	53	Did not advance			115.00	53

== See also ==
- Netherlands Antilles at the 2003 Pan American Games
