= Netherlands Antilles at the 2008 Summer Olympics =

- Flag of the Netherlands Antilles
- IOC code: AHO
- NOC: Nederlands Antilliaans Olympisch Comité
- Website: www.sports.an (in English)

in Beijing
- Competitors: 3 in 3 sports
- Flag bearer: Churandy Martina
- Medals: Gold 0 Silver 0 Bronze 0 Total 0

Summer Olympics appearances (overview)
- 1952; 1956; 1960; 1964; 1968; 1972; 1976; 1980; 1984; 1988; 1992; 1996; 2000; 2004; 2008

Other related appearances
- Independent Olympic Athletes (2012); Aruba (2016–pres.); Netherlands (2016–pres.)

A delegation from the Netherlands Antilles competed at the 2008 Summer Olympics in Beijing, China. It was the fifteenth and final appearance of the Netherlands Antilles at the Summer Olympics, as the territory was dissolved before the 2012 Summer Olympics in London, during which the IOC decided that Dutch Antillean athletes would participate independently under the Olympic flag.

The Netherlands Antilles' delegation was composed of three athletes participating in three different sports: Rodion Davelaar in swimming, Philip Elhage in shooting, and Churandy Martina in track and field. Neither Davelaar or Elhage continued past the qualification rounds, but Martina reached the finals for the 100m and 200m dashes. Martina scored fourth place in the 100m dash and second place in the 200m dash (the latter behind Usain Bolt), but was disqualified after a controversial American-led protest.

== Background ==
The appearance of the Netherlands Antilles at the Beijing Summer Olympics marked its thirteenth and final appearance. The Netherlands Antilles had consistently appeared at the Summer Olympics since the 1952 Summer Olympics in Helsinki, Finland, excluding two Olympics that had been boycotted due to Soviet incursions in other countries. Churandy Martina was the flagbearer for the Netherlands Antilles at the closing and opening ceremonies for the 2008 Summer Olympics.

Issues regarding debt and revenue-sharing within the Netherlands Antilles eventually led to the dissolution of the territory and its division as constituent islands Curaçao and Sint Maarten claimed a status of autonomy similar to that of Aruba, while the islands Bonaire, Saba, and Sint Eustatius were absorbed directly into the Netherlands. Thus, the 2008 Summer Olympics served as the final Olympic Games in which the Netherlands Antilles participated as a territory. The future of the Dutch Antillean athletes to participate in the 2012 Summer Olympics in London were cast into doubt as a result. As residents of the Netherlands Antilles hold Dutch passports, IAAF General Secretary Pierre Weiss remarked all former Dutch Antillean athletes should immediately become eligible to represent the Netherlands in the Netherlands Antilles' stead. Ultimately, however, the IOC decided in its 123rd session upon three items: that former Dutch Antillean athletes would compete independently under the Olympic flag; that recognition for the Netherlands Antilles' Olympic Committee was to be withdrawn; and that a temporary administrative structure would serve in the Dutch Antillean NOC's place until after the 2012 London games, directly supervised and supported by the IOC.

== Athletics ==
Churandy Martina was the only Dutch Antillean to participate in track and field in the 2008 Beijing Olympics. He participated in two events: The 100m dash and the 200m dash.

=== 100 m dash ===
On 14 August, Martina completed round one of qualifications for the 100m dash at 10.35 seconds. This placed Martina at first in his heat (Heat 10). He ranked twenty-seventh in the round, tying with Walter Dix from the United States and Andrew Hinds from Barbados. In round two on 14 August, Martina ran the 100m dash in 9.99 seconds, tying for second with Richard Thompson of Trinidad and Tobago, and falling behind Usain Bolt of Jamaica by 0.07 seconds. Martina advanced because of his score, and was first in his heat on 15 August, running 9.99 seconds. Churandy Martina advanced to semifinals and ran the 100m dash in 9.94 seconds, scoring third in his heat (behind Thompson and Jamaica's Asafa Powell) and fourth overall (also behind Bolt). He also ranked fourth in the finals, falling 0.02 seconds short of bronze medalist Walter Dix's time. Consequently, he did not medal in the event.

=== 200 m dash ===
Martina ranked third in his heat in the 17 August qualifications for the 200m dash, finishing the event in 20.78 seconds and falling behind Azerbaijan's Ramil Guliyev and Nigeria's Obinna Metu. Overall, Martina ranked in twenty-fourth place, but advanced. During round two of qualifications on 17 August, Martina ran the 200m dash in 20.42 seconds, second place in the heat before Antigua and Barbuda's Brendan Christian. In round two, Martina ranked tenth place, tying with the United States' Shawn Crawford. Martina ran the 200m in 20.11 seconds during semifinals, ranking first in his heat and second overall behind Usain Bolt. He then advanced to the finals round.

Martina's participation in the 200m finals round was controversial. Martina came in second place to Usain Bolt, completing the event in 19.82 seconds over Usain Bolt's world-record breaking performance of 19.30 seconds. However, when American would-be bronze medalist Wallace Spearmon was disqualified for running outside of his lane, the American coaches reviewed video records of the race and found that Martina had done the same. The United States filed a protest against the Netherlands Antilles. The Dutch Antillean Olympic committee argued that the challenge was invalid, having been filed after the 30-minute post-race deadline, but Martina was disqualified from receiving the silver medal anyway. Shawn Crawford of the United States, who originally finished the race in fourth place, was given the silver medal, and Walter Dix was given the bronze medal in place of Spearmon.

Shortly after the 2008 Olympics, Crawford competed against Martina again in a meet in Zurich, Switzerland. At a hotel during the course of the meet, Crawford left the silver medal for Martina, believing that Martina deserved the medal more than he.

Key

- Note–Ranks given for track events are within the athlete's heat only
- Q = Qualified for the next round
- q = Qualified for the next round as a fastest loser or, in field events, by position without achieving the qualifying target
- NR = National record
- N/A = Round not applicable for the event
- Bye = Athlete not required to compete in round

Men

Athlete	Event	Heat		Quarterfinal		Semifinal		Final	
Athlete	Event	Result	Rank	Result	Rank	Result	Rank	Result	Rank
Churandy Martina	100 m	10.35	1 Q	9.99	1 Q	9.94	3 Q	9.93 NR	4
Churandy Martina	200 m	20.78	3 Q	20.42	2 Q	20.11 NR	1 Q	DSQ	

== Shooting ==
Philip Elhage was the only Dutch Antillean to participate in shooting events at the 2008 Summer Olympics. He participated in the 10m air pistol. During 9 August, the 10m air pistol event was held in Beijing, with forty-nine competitors. Elhage scored 566.0, ranking forty-fifth. Elhage scored the same as Yusuf Dikec from Turkey. Overall, Elhage's score fell 122.2 short of Pang Wei of China, who won the gold medal in the event.

Men

Athlete	Event	Qualification		Final	
Athlete	Event	Points	Rank	Points	Rank
Philip Elhage	10 m air pistol	566	46	Did not advance	

== Swimming ==
Rodion Davelaar was the only Dutch Antillean athlete to participate in swimming in the 2008 Summer Olympics. He participated in the 50m freestyle. He was the recipient of a 2008 IOC Olympic Scholarship, which provided Davelaar with training facilities, a specialized coach and insurance. Additionally, the Scholarship covered costs for lodging, checkups, and Davelaar's entry for and participation in qualification competitions for the 2008 Olympics.

During the 14 August preliminaries, Davelaar swam the 50m freestyle in 24.21 seconds. He ranked second in Heat 6, falling behind Yellow Yei Yah of Nigeria by 0.21 seconds. Overall, Davelaar ranked fifty-seventh out of ninety-seven swimmers. Davelaar's time was 2.75 seconds slower than French swimmer Amaury Leveaux during his performance in the 14 August preliminaries, who ranked first and set an Olympic record in the preliminary session. Davelaar did not advance past the 14 August preliminaries.

Men

Athlete	Event	Heat		Semifinal		Final	
Athlete	Event	Time	Rank	Time	Rank	Time	Rank
Rodion Davelaar	50 m freestyle	24.21	57	Did not advance			

== See also ==
- Netherlands Antilles at the 2007 Pan American Games
- Netherlands Antilles at the 2010 Central American and Caribbean Games
