= Netherlands Antilles at the 1984 Summer Olympics =

- Flag of the Netherlands Antilles
- IOC code: AHO
- NOC: Nederlands Antilliaans Olympisch Comité

in Los Angeles
- Competitors: 8
- Medals: Gold 0 Silver 0 Bronze 0 Total 0

Summer Olympics appearances (overview)
- 1952; 1956; 1960; 1964; 1968; 1972; 1976; 1980; 1984; 1988; 1992; 1996; 2000; 2004; 2008

Other related appearances
- Independent Olympic Athletes (2012); Aruba (2016–); Netherlands (2016–)

The Netherlands Antilles competed at the 1984 Summer Olympics in Los Angeles, United States. The nation returned to the Olympic Games after missing the 1980 Summer Olympics.

== Results by event ==
=== Athletics ===
Women's 100 metres

- Evelyn Farrell

- First Heat — 11.94s (→ did not advance)

=== Swimming ===
Men's 100m Freestyle

- Hilton Woods

- Heat — 53.92 (→ did not advance, 40th place)

- Evert Johan Kroon

- Heat — 55.20 (→ did not advance, 51st place)

Men's 200m Freestyle

- Evert Johan Kroon

- Heat — 1:57.05 (→ did not advance, 38th place)

Men's 400m Freestyle

- Evert Johan Kroon

- Heat — 4:12.60 (→ did not advance, 32nd place)

Women's 100m Backstroke

- Petra Bekaert

- Heat — 1:10.60 (→ did not advance, 30th place)
