= Netherlands Antilles at the 1992 Winter Olympics =

- Flag of the Netherlands Antilles
- IOC code: AHO
- NOC: Nederlands Antilliaans Olympisch Comité
- Website: www.sports.an (in English)

in Albertville
- Competitors: 2 (men) in 1 sport
- Medals: Gold 0 Silver 0 Bronze 0 Total 0

Winter Olympics appearances (overview)
- 1988; 1992

Other related appearances
- Netherlands (2016–pres.)

The Netherlands Antilles sent a delegation to compete at the 1992 Winter Olympics in Albertville, France from 8–23 February 1992. This was the Netherlands Antilles' second and final appearance at a Winter Olympic Games before the territory was abolished. The delegation consisted of two competitors; Bart Carpentier Alting and Dudley den Dulk; who came 37th in the two-man bobsleigh.

== Background ==
The Nederlands Antilliaans Olympisch Comité was recognized by the International Olympic Committee on 1 January 1950. The Netherlands Antilles joined Olympic competition soon after, at the 1952 Summer Olympics. The territory made only two appearances at the Winter Olympic Games, in 1988 at Calgary, and these 1992 Albertville Games. The Netherlands Antilles was dissolved as a political entity in October 2010. The 1992 Winter Olympics were held from 8–23 February 1992, a total of 1,801 athletes representing 64 National Olympic Committees took part. The Netherlands Antilles sent two athletes to Albertville, in the bobsleigh competition, Bart Carpentier Alting and Dudley den Dulk. Den Dulk was selected as the flagbearer for the opening ceremony.

== Competitors ==
The following is the list of number of competitors in the Games.

Sport	Men	Women	Total
Bobsleigh	2	–	2
Total	2	0	2

== Bobsleigh ==
Bart Carpentier Alting was 37 years old at the time of the Albertville Olympics, and had previously represented the Netherlands Antilles four years prior in Calgary. Dudley den Dulk was 20 years old at the time, and was making his only appearance in Olympic competition. The two-man bobsleigh competition was held over four runs on 15–16 February, with two runs being held on each day, and the sum of all four run times determining final placement. The Netherlands Antillean sled finished the first run in 1 minute and 2.97 seconds, and the second run in 1 minute and 3.26 seconds. Overnight, they were tied for 36th place. The next day, they finished the third run in 1 minute and 3.40 seconds, and the fourth in 1 minute and 3.46 seconds. Their total time for the event was 4 minutes and 13.09 seconds, which put them in 37th place out of 46 sleds. The gold medal was won by the first Swiss sled in 4 minutes and 3.26 seconds, and silver and bronze were both won by German sleds.

Sled	Athletes	Event	Run 1		Run 2		Run 3		Run 4		Total	
Sled	Athletes	Event	Time	Rank	Time	Rank	Time	Rank	Time	Rank	Time	Rank
AHO-1	Bart Carpentier Alting; Dudley den Dulk	Two-man	1:02.97	38	1:03.26	36	1:03.40	37	1:03.46	39	4:13.09	37

== See also ==
- Netherlands Antilles at the 1992 Summer Olympics
