= Netherlands Antilles at the 1960 Summer Olympics =

- Flag of the Netherlands Antilles
- IOC code: AHO (ATO used at these Games)
- NOC: Nederlands Antilliaans Olympisch Comité

in Rome
- Medals: Gold 0 Silver 0 Bronze 0 Total 0

Summer Olympics appearances (overview)
- 1952; 1956; 1960; 1964; 1968; 1972; 1976; 1980; 1984; 1988; 1992; 1996; 2000; 2004; 2008

Other related appearances
- Independent Olympic Athletes (2012); Aruba (2016–); Netherlands (2016–)

The Netherlands Antilles competed at the 1960 Summer Olympics in Rome, Italy. The nation returned to the Olympic Games after boycotting the 1956 Summer Olympics, joining the Netherlands in protest of the participation of the Soviet Union, who invaded Hungary during the USSR's invasion of Hungary.
