= Netherlands Antilles at the 1976 Summer Olympics =

- Flag of the Netherlands Antilles
- IOC code: AHO
- NOC: Nederlands Antilliaans Olympisch Comité

in Montreal 17 July–1 August 1976
- Competitors: 4
- Medals: Gold 0 Silver 0 Bronze 0 Total 0

Summer Olympics appearances (overview)
- 1952; 1956; 1960; 1964; 1968; 1972; 1976; 1980; 1984; 1988; 1992; 1996; 2000; 2004; 2008

Other related appearances
- Independent Olympic Athletes (2012); Aruba (2016–); Netherlands (2016–)

The Netherlands Antilles competed at the 1976 Summer Olympics in Montreal, Quebec, Canada.
