= Van Aanholt =

Van Aanholt is a surname. Notable people with the surname include:

- Cor van Aanholt (born 1959), Dutch Antillean sailor
- Linn van Aanholt (born 2001), Dutch rower
- Patrick van Aanholt (born 1990), Dutch footballer
- Philipine van Aanholt (born 1992), Curaçaoan sailor
- Odile van Aanholt (born 1998), Dutch sailor
