= Netherlands Antilles at the 1988 Winter Olympics =

- Flag of the Netherlands Antilles
- IOC code: AHO
- NOC: Nederlands Antilliaans Olympisch Comité
- Website: www.sports.an (in English)

in Calgary
- Competitors: 2 (men) in 2 sports
- Medals: Gold 0 Silver 0 Bronze 0 Total 0

Winter Olympics appearances (overview)
- 1988; 1992

Other related appearances
- Netherlands (2016–)

The Netherlands Antilles competed in the Winter Olympic Games for the first time at the 1988 Winter Olympics in Calgary, Alberta, Canada.

== Competitors ==
The following is the list of number of competitors in the Games.

Sport	Men	Women	Total
Bobsleigh	2	–	2
Luge	1	0	1
Total	2	0	2

== Bobsleigh ==
Sled	Athletes	Event	Run 1		Run 2		Run 3		Run 4		Total	
Sled	Athletes	Event	Time	Rank	Time	Rank	Time	Rank	Time	Rank	Time	Rank
AHO-1	Bart Carpentier Alting; Bart Drechsel	Two-man	59.60	30	1:00.78	27	1:01.95	32	1:01.40	31	4:03.73	29

== Luge ==
Men

Athlete	Run 1		Run 2		Run 3		Run 4		Total	
Athlete	Time	Rank	Time	Rank	Time	Rank	Time	Rank	Time	Rank
Bart Carpentier Alting	50.802	37	53.468	37	53.501	35	52.142	35	3:29.913	36
