= Stibbe =

Stibbe is a German surname. It is a habitational surname named for a settlement in West Prussia. In the Netherlands, there were 128 people with the surname Stibbe as of 2007, up from 116 in 1947. The 2010 United States census found 255 people with the surname Stibbe, ranking it the 75,564th-most-common surname in the country. This represented a decrease from 262 people (69,854th-most-common) in the 2000 census. In both censuses, more than 95% of the bearers of the surname identified as non-Hispanic white.

== People with the surname ==
- Eddy Stibbe (born 1948), Dutch-born equestrian
- Eytan Stibbe (born 1958), Israeli astronaut
- Jacques Stibbe (1920–1999), Belgian philatelist
- Matthew Stibbe (fl. 1980s), video game developer, founder of Intelligent Games
- Max Stibbe (1898–1973), Dutch anthroposophist and educationist
- Nina Stibbe (born 1962), British writer
