= Netherlands Antilles at the 1972 Summer Olympics =

- Flag of the Netherlands Antilles
- IOC code: AHO
- NOC: Nederlands Antilliaans Olympisch Comité

in Munich
- Competitors: 2 in 2 sports
- Medals: Gold 0 Silver 0 Bronze 0 Total 0

Summer Olympics appearances (overview)
- 1952; 1956; 1960; 1964; 1968; 1972; 1976; 1980; 1984; 1988; 1992; 1996; 2000; 2004; 2008

Other related appearances
- Independent Olympic Athletes (2012); Aruba (2016–pres.); Netherlands (2016–pres.)

The Netherlands Antilles competed at the 1972 Summer Olympics in Munich, West Germany, which were held from 26 August to 11 September. This edition of the Games marked the nation's sixth appearance at the Summer Games since its debut in 1952 and after missing it in 1956. For the 1972 Summer Games, the Netherlands Antilles sent shooter Bèto Adriana and Roberto Lindeborg. Both of them did not medal.

== Background ==
The 1972 Summer Olympics were held from 26 August to 11 September in Munich, West Germany. Among the competing nations was the constituent country of the Netherlands Antilles, which, by 1972, was composed of the territories of Aruba, Bonaire, Curaçao, Saba, Sint Eustatius, and Sint Maarten. This edition of the Games marked the nation's sixth appearance at the Summer Games since its debut at the 1952 Summer Olympics, and after missing the 1956 Summer Olympics. The nation had never won a medal at an Olympic Games.

== Shooting ==
For the shooting events at the 1972 Summer Olympics, the Netherlands Antilles sent Bèto Adriana. Previously, Adriana had competed as a weightlifter at the 1960 Summer Olympics for the nation. He was entered in the 50 metre rifle prone event, competing on 28 August against 100 other competitors. There, he earned a total of 566 points out of a possible 600, and placed 100th.

Shooter	Event	Final	
Shooter	Event	Score	Rank
Bèto Adriana	50 m rifle prone	566	100

== Weightlifting ==
For the weightlifting events, the Netherlands Antilles sent Roberto Lindeborg. He competed in the men's 56 kg category on 28 August against 23 other competitors. There, he lifted 100.0 kilorgams for the military press, 85.0 for the snatch, and 115.0 kilograms for the clean and jerk, for a total of 300.0 kilograms. He placed 19th overall.

Athlete	Event	Military press		Snatch		Clean & jerk		Total	
Athlete	Event	Weight	Rank	Weight	Rank	Weight	Rank	Weight	Rank
Roberto Lindeborg	56 kg	100.0	=19	85.0	=19	115.0	=17	300.0	19
