= Netherlands Antilles at the 1968 Summer Olympics =

- Flag of the Netherlands Antilles
- IOC code: AHO
- NOC: Nederlands Antilliaans Olympisch Comité

in Mexico City
- Competitors: 5 in 2 sports
- Medals: Gold 0 Silver 0 Bronze 0 Total 0

Summer Olympics appearances (overview)
- 1952; 1956; 1960; 1964; 1968; 1972; 1976; 1980; 1984; 1988; 1992; 1996; 2000; 2004; 2008

Other related appearances
- Independent Olympic Athletes (2012); Aruba (2016–); Netherlands (2016–)

The Netherlands Antilles competed at the 1968 Summer Olympics in Mexico City, Mexico. Five competitors, three men and two women, took part in four events in two sports.

== Results by athlete ==
=== Fencing ===
- Ivonne Witteveen

- Women's foil — First round: 6th place in group B with 1 win and 4 losses (did not advance)
1. lost to Antonella Ragno (ITA)
2. defeated Lidia Sakovics (HUN)
3. lost to Marie Depetris (FRA)
4. lost to Janet Wardell-Yerburgh (GBR)
5. lost to Kamila Składanowska (POL)

- Myrna Anselma

- Women's foil — First round: 6th place in group E with 1 win and 5 losses (did not advance)
1. lost to Clara Stahl-lencic (ROU)
2. lost to Pilar Roldán (MEX)
3. lost to Galina Gorokhova (URS)
4. lost to Heidi Schmid (FRG)
5. defeated Colette Flesch (LUX)
6. lost to Sylvia San Martín (ARG)

- Jan Boutmy

- Men's sabre — First round: 6th place in group E with 1 win and 5 losses (did not advance)
1. lost to Claude Arabo (FRA)
2. lost to Tibor Pézsa (HUN)
3. lost to Paul Wischeidt (FRG)
4. lost to Jozef Nowara (POL)
5. lost to John Andru (CAN)
6. defeated Juan Frecia (ARG)

=== Weightlifting ===
- Rudy Monk

- Middleweight
1. Press: 132.5 kg
2. Snatch: 117.5 kg
3. Jerk: 150.0 kg
4. Total: 400.0 kg (→ 16th place)

- Fortunato Rijna

- Light-heavyweight
1. Press: 142.5 kg
2. Snatch: 115.0 kg
3. Jerk: 162.5 kg
4. Total: 420.0 kg (→ 17th place)
