= Netherlands Antilles at the 1964 Summer Olympics =

- Flag of the Netherlands Antilles
- IOC code: AHO (NAN used at these Games)
- NOC: Nederlands Antilliaans Olympisch Comité

in Tokyo
- Competitors: 4 in 2 sports
- Medals: Gold 0 Silver 0 Bronze 0 Total 0

Summer Olympics appearances (overview)
- 1952; 1956; 1960; 1964; 1968; 1972; 1976; 1980; 1984; 1988; 1992; 1996; 2000; 2004; 2008

Other related appearances
- Independent Olympic Athletes (2012); Aruba (2016–pres.); Netherlands (2016–pres.)

The Netherlands Antilles competed at the 1964 Summer Olympics in Tokyo, Japan. Four competitors, all men, took part in four events in two sports.

== Fencing ==
One fencer represented the Netherlands Antilles in 1964.

Men's sabre

- Jan Boutmy
