= Netherlands Antilles at the 1952 Summer Olympics =

- Flag of the Netherlands
- IOC code: AHO
- NOC: Nederlands Antilliaans Olympisch Comité

in Helsinki
- Competitors: 11 in 1 sport
- Medals: Gold 0 Silver 0 Bronze 0 Total 0

Summer Olympics appearances (overview)
- 1952; 1956; 1960; 1964; 1968; 1972; 1976; 1980; 1984; 1988; 1992; 1996; 2000; 2004; 2008

Other related appearances
- Independent Olympic Athletes (2012); Aruba (2016–pres.); Netherlands (2016–pres.)

The Netherlands Antilles competed in the Summer Olympic Games for the first time at the 1952 Summer Olympics in Helsinki, Finland. The Caribbean nation, then a colonial territory of the Netherlands, was represented by their association football team.

== Football ==
The Netherlands Antilles national football team was one of 25 teams entered in the tournament. They lost their first round match to Turkey and were eliminated from the tournament.

Squad

1. Ergilio Hato (gk)
3. Pedro Matrona
4. Wilfred de Lanoi
6. Wilhelm Canword
7. Guillermo Giribaldi
8. Edmundo Vlinder
12. Adriaan Brokke
14. Jorge Brion
15. Juan Briezen
17. Willys Heyliger
20. Guillermo Krips

Match results

21 July 1952
19:00

| Turkey | 2–1 | Netherlands Antilles |
|---|---|---|
| Tokaç 9'; Bilge 76' (pen.) | Report | Briezen 79' |

Lahden kisapuisto, Lahti
Attendance: 3,696
Referee: Carl Jorgensen (DEN)
