= Athletics at the 2010 South American Games – Women's long jump =

The Women's Long Jump event at the 2010 South American Games was held on March 20 at 17:30.

== Medalists ==
Gold	Silver	Bronze
Ana Esperança; Brazil	Munich Tovar; Venezuela	Melissa Valencia; Colombia

== Records ==
Standing records prior to the 2010 South American Games
World record	Galina Chistyakova	Russia	7.52m	Leningrad, Russia	11 June 1988
World Leading	Jacinta Boyd	Australia	6.47m	Perth, Australia	19 February 2010
South American record	Maurren Higa Maggi	Brazil	7.26m	Bogotá, Colombia	26 June 1999
South American U23 record	Keila da Silva Costa	Brazil	6.63m	São Paulo, Brazil	17 June 2005

== Results ==
Results were published.

=== Final ===
Rank	Athlete	Nationality	Attempt						Best Result	Notes
Rank	Athlete	Nationality	1	2	3	4	5	6	Best Result	Notes
1st place, gold medalist(s)	Ana Esperança	Brazil	5.80	x	x	x	5.99	x	5.99 wind: +1.0 m/s	
2nd place, silver medalist(s)	Munich Tovar	Venezuela	x	5.78	5.87	5.58	5.97	5.77	5.97 wind: +2.2 m/s	w
3rd place, bronze medalist(s)	Melissa Valencia	Colombia	x	5.65	5.89	5.95	x	5.96	5.96 wind: +1.4 m/s	
4	Bianca dos Santos	Brazil	5.81	5.95	x	5.83	5.85	5.60	5.95 wind: -0.1 m/s	
5	Meruska Eduarda	Netherlands Antilles	x	5.34	5.83	5.78	x	5.91	5.91 wind: +1.5 m/s	NR, ^{†}
6	Carla Cavero	Bolivia	x	-	5.28	5.38	5.68	5.74	5.74 wind: +2.2 m/s	w
7	Feber Hernández	Venezuela	5.33	5.49	5.39	5.55	5.54	5.49	5.55 wind: +1.4 m/s	
8	Diana Paola Sinisterra	Colombia	5.36	5.29	5.30	5.42	5.16	x	5.42 wind: +2.0 m/s	
9	Vanesa Karg	Argentina	5.19	5.17	5.18				5.19 wind: -0.6 m/s	

^{†}: Not eligible for the South American Under-23 Championships.

== See also ==
- 2010 South American Under-23 Championships in Athletics
