= Netherlands Antilles at the 1992 Summer Olympics =

- Flag of the Netherlands Antilles
- IOC code: AHO
- NOC: Netherlands Antilles Olympic Committee

in Barcelona
- Competitors: 4 in 3 sports
- Medals: Gold 0 Silver 0 Bronze 0 Total 0

Summer Olympics appearances (overview)
- 1952; 1956; 1960; 1964; 1968; 1972; 1976; 1980; 1984; 1988; 1992; 1996; 2000; 2004; 2008

Other related appearances
- Independent Olympic Athletes (2012); Aruba (2016–); Netherlands (2016–)

The Netherlands Antilles was represented at the 1992 Summer Olympics in Barcelona, Spain by the Netherlands Antilles Olympic Committee.

In total, four athletes including three men and one woman represented the Netherlands Antilles in three different sports including athletics, sailing and shooting.

== Background ==
The Netherlands Antilles Olympic Committee was recognised by the International Olympic Committee in 1950. The Netherlands Antilles made their Olympic debut at the 1952 Summer Olympics in Helsinki, Finland. They missed the 1956 Summer Olympics in Melbourne, Victoria, Australia but returned for the 1960 Summer Olympics in Rome, Italy and established themselves as a regular competitor at the Olympics thereafter. They appeared at every subsequent games except the 1980 Summer Olympics in Moscow, Russian Soviet Federative Socialist Republic, Soviet Union after taking part in the United States-led boycott. The 1992 Summer Olympics in Barcelona, Spain marked their ninth Olympic appearance.

== Competitors ==
In total, four athletes represented the Netherlands Antilles at the 1992 Summer Olympics in Barcelona, Spain across three different sports.

Sport	Men	Women	Total
Athletics	1	0	1
Sailing	1	1	2
Shooting	1	0	1
Total	3	1	4

== Athletics ==
In total, one Netherlands Antillean athlete participated in the athletics events – James Sharpe in the men's 110 m hurdles.

== Sailing ==
In total, two Netherlands Antillean athletes participated in the sailing events – Constantino Saragoza in the women's lechner A-390 and Bep de Waard in the men's lechner A-390.

== Shooting ==
In total, one Netherlands Antillean athlete participated in the shooting events – Michel Daou in the trap.

== See also ==
- Netherlands Antilles at the 1991 Pan American Games
