= Reginald de Windt =

Olympic judoka

Personal information
- Full name: Reginald Andres Alejandro de Windt
- Nickname: Juny
- Nationality: Curaçao
- Born: 30 November 1983 (age 42)
- Height: 1.72 m (5 ft 8 in)
- Weight: 81 kg (179 lb)
- Updated on 28 July 2012

Reginald de Windt (born 30 November 1983) is a judoka from Curaçao who participated in the 2012 Summer Olympics as one of four "Independent Olympic Athletes".

== Biography ==
De Windt grew up in Curaçao; his nickname "Juny" derives from "Junior", added to his name since his father's name is also Reginald. He got interested in judo through his uncle, Efigenio Braafhart, a judoka who became his coach. He got a technical degree and works as a computer programmer.

Since the Netherlands Antilles Olympic Committee, which had planned to continue functioning after the dissolution of the Netherlands Antilles, had its membership withdrawn by the IOC Executive Committee at the IOC session of June 2011, no Dutch Antillean athletes could officially represent their country. However, Dutch Antillean athletes who qualified for the 2012 Olympics were allowed to participate independently under the Olympic flag.

De Windt qualified at the 2012 Pan American Judo Championships in Montreal for the Men's under 81 kg event in Judo at the 2012 Summer Olympics, where he lost in the 1st Round to Ivan Nifontov of Russia.
