= Athletics at the 2002 South American Games =

Athletics at the VII South American Games
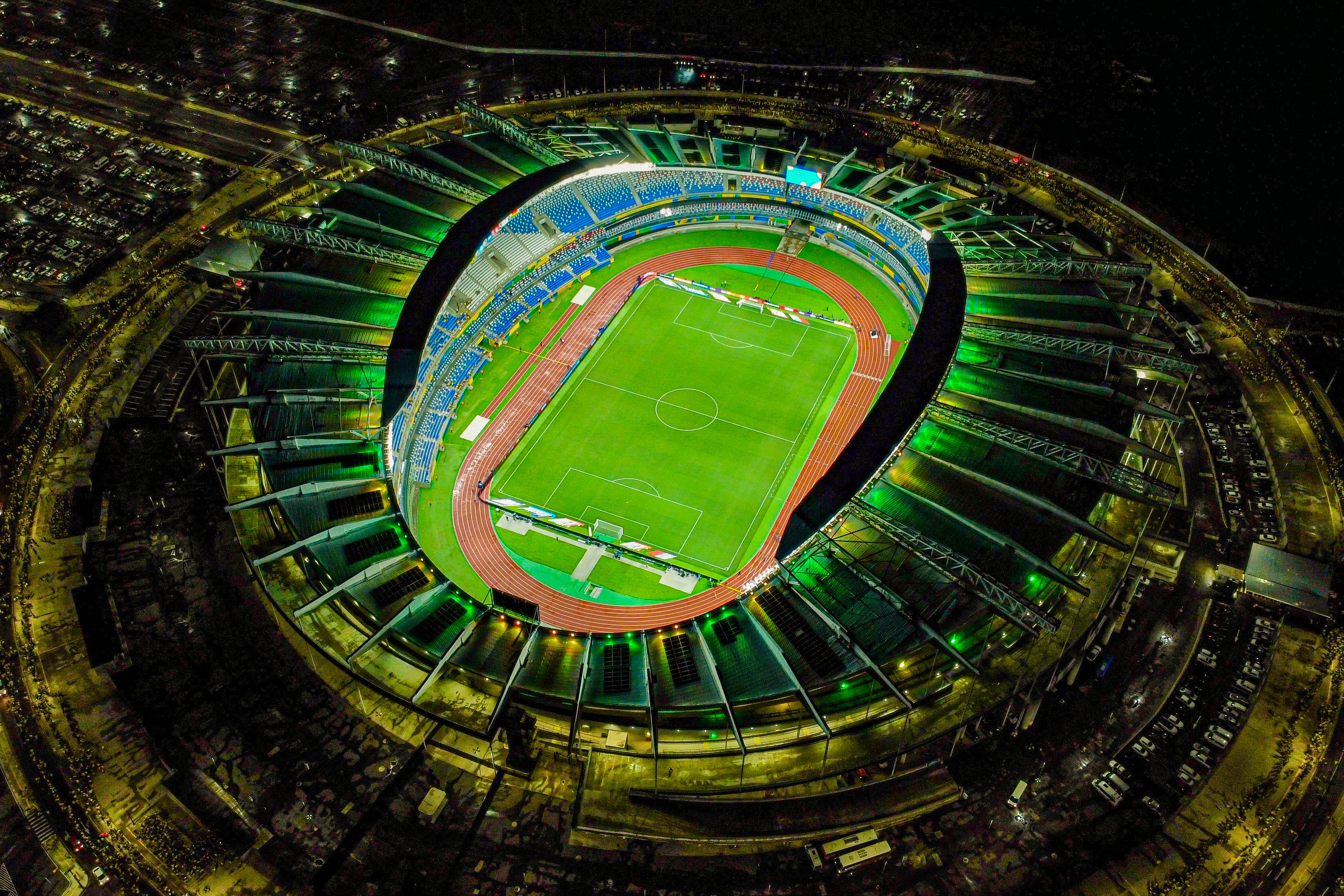
- Estádio Olímpico do Pará
- Dates: August 1–3
- Host city: Belém, Brazil
- Venue: Estádio Olímpico do Pará
- Level: Junior
- Events: 44 (22 men, 22 women)

Athletics events at the 2002 South American Games were held at the Estádio Olímpico do Pará (Mangueirão) in Belém, Brazil, between August 1–3, 2002. For the first time, the tournament was restricted to junior athletes (U-20). The results were used to determine the medals awarded for this year's South American Junior Championships.

A total of 44 events were contested, 22 by men and 22 by women.

== Medal summary ==
Medal winners were published in a book written by Argentinian journalist Ernesto Rodríguez III with support of the Argentine Olympic Committee (Spanish: Comité Olímpico Argentino) under the auspices of the Ministry of Education (Spanish: Ministerio de Educación de la Nación) in collaboration with the Office of Sports (Spanish: Secretaría de Deporte de la Nación). Eduardo Biscayart supplied the list of winners and their results. Further results are published for the South American Junior Championships (Netherlands Antilles unregarded). Churandy Martina's results are collected elsewhere.

Results that are identical to the South American Junior Championships are shown elsewhere. Here, only those results are displayed that are different.

Further events with low participation (only 4 athletes from 3 countries) are men's High jump and Javelin throw, and women's 3000 metres steeplechase, Shot put, and Heptathlon. However, there is no indication for awarding a reduced number of medals.

=== Men ===
Other results of the men's events are shown elsewhere.

Event	Gold		Silver		Bronze	
100 metres	Churandy Martina; Netherlands Antilles	10.42	Bruno Pacheco; Brazil	10.50	Eliezer De Almeida; Brazil	10.60
200 metres	Bruno Pacheco; Brazil	20.54	Churandy Martina; Netherlands Antilles	20.81	Jorge Sena; Brazil	21.18
3000 metres steeplechase	Fernando Fernandes; Brazil	8:59.76	Diego Moreno; Peru	9:08.34	Rodolfo Hass^{†} Brazil	9:20.70

==== Note ====
^{†}: No medal because of lack of minimum participation.

=== Women ===
Other results of the women's events are shown elsewhere.

Event	Gold		Silver		Bronze	
Discus Throw	Roberta De Oliveira; Brazil	41.85	Jennifer Dahlgren; Argentina	41.41	Roberta Campos^{†} Brazil	40.70
Javelin throw	María Do Carmo Alves; Brazil	45.31	María Aparecida Cruz^{†} Brazil	44.31	Adriana Benavente; Venezuela	32.78

==== Note ====
^{†}: No medal because of lack of minimum participation.

== Doping ==
Doping offences during the athletics events of the games are documented elsewhere.

== Medal table (unofficial) ==
An unofficial medal count for the athletics events at South American Games is shown below. This medal table differs from the medal table published for the South American Under-23 Championships because of different number of nations, and the minimum participation necessary to award a full set of medals as introduced by ODESUR. Affected are the medal counts for Brazil, Chile, and the Netherlands Antilles.

* Host nation (Brazil)

Rank	Nation	Gold	Silver	Bronze	Total
1	Brazil*	32	12	16	60
2	Argentina	5	5	5	15
3	Venezuela	4	11	8	23
4	Chile	1	5	7	13
5	Ecuador	1	5	2	8
6	Netherlands Antilles	1	1	0	2
7	Peru	0	2	2	4
8	Guyana	0	1	2	3
9	Uruguay	0	1	1	2
Totals (9 entries)		44	43	43	130
