= List of Netherlands Antillean records in athletics =

The following are the national records in athletics in Netherlands Antilles maintained by Nederlands Antilliaanse Atletiek Unie (NAAU). The country was dissolved in 2010.

== Outdoor ==
=== Men ===
Event	Record	Athlete	Date	Meet	Place	Ref.
100 m	9.93 (±0.0 m/s)	Churandy Martina	16 August 2008	Olympic Games	Beijing, China	
200 m	20.08 (+0.4 m/s)	Churandy Martina	8 July 2010	Athletissima	Lausanne, Switzerland	
400 m	46.13	Churandy Martina	31 March 2007		El Paso, United States	
800 m	1:51.0	Richard Riley	11 August 1973		Papendal, Netherlands	
1500 m	3:53.0	Richard Riley	16 September 1973		Papendal, Netherlands	
3000 m	8:48.13	James Lynch	7 August 1993		Weinstadt, Germany	
5000 m	14:49.6	Ronald Mercelina	3 March 1970		Panama City, Panama	
10,000 m						
Marathon	2:57:28	Herman Couperus	17 March 2007		Curaçao, Netherlands Antilles	
110 m hurdles	13.93	James Sharpe	2 July 1995		Budapest, Hungary	
400 m hurdles	53.77	Helvin Felix	8 August 1981		Utrecht, Netherlands	
3000 m steeplechase						
High jump	2.03 m	Quentin Siberie	20 March 2010	South American Games	Medellín, Colombia	
Pole vault	3.50 m	Ivor Landburg	31 August 1997		Sittard, Netherlands	
Long jump	7.68 m	Ellsworth Manuel	24 July 1993		Amsterdam, Netherlands	
Triple jump	15.18 m	Ellsworth Manuel	8 June 1997		Krommenie, Netherlands	
Shot put	15.12 m	Lambertus Rebel	15 December 1962		Willemstad, Netherlands Antilles	
Discus throw	51.16 m	Lambertus Rebel	8 June 1958		Amsterdam, Netherlands	
Hammer throw	49.50 m	Lambertus Rebel	5 October 1957		The Hague, Netherlands	
Javelin throw	55.90 m	James Sharpe	2 September 1987		Eindhoven, Netherlands	
Decathlon	6487 pts	Ivor Landburg	17-18 May 1997		Emmeloord, Netherlands	
Decathlon	100m / Long jump / Shot put / High jump / 400m / 110m H / Discus / Pole vault / Javelin / 1500m; 11.21 / 6.75 m / 10.85 m / 1.91 m / 50.58 / 15.55 / 32.92 m / 3.10 m / 41.90 m / 4:34.85					
20 km walk (road)						
50 km walk (road)						
4 × 100 m relay	38.45	Netherlands Antilles; Geronimo Goeloe; Charlton Rafaela; Jairo Duzant; Churandy Martina	13 August 2005	World Championships	Helsinki, Finland	
4 × 400 m relay	3:17.46	Netherlands Antilles; N. Dimfires; J. Troeman; D. Manuel; Terrence Agard	13 April 2009		Old Port of Marseille, France	
4 × 400 m relay	3:15.66	Mixed Nationalities; NED Terrence Agard; NED Liemarvin Bonevacia; AHO Javier Agard; AHO Jairo Troeman	11 July 2010	6th NACAC U23 Championships	Miramar, United States	

=== Women ===
Event	Record	Athlete	Date	Meet	Place	Ref.
100 m	11.73 (+0.9 m/s)	Evelyn Farrell	22 July 1983	Central American and Caribbean Championships	Havana, Cuba	
200 m	24.39 A	Jacqueline Sophia	30 November 1990	Central American and Caribbean Games	Mexico City, Mexico	
400 m	53.97	Florencia Hunt	5 May 2001		Fairfax, United States	
800 m	2:03.16	Florencia Hunt	9 June 2001		Nassau, The Bahamas	
1500 m	4:43.36	Florencia Hunt	19 March 2004		Charlotte, United States	
3000 m	13:40.90	Damaris Sweet	18 March 2006		Willemstad, Netherlands Antilles	
5000 m	21:50.07	Jacqueline Hol	9 June 2007		Willemstad, Netherlands Antilles	
10,000 m						
Marathon	3:43:27	Nel Geerings	15 April 1991	Boston Marathon	Boston, United States	
100 m hurdles	14.52 A	Elisabeth Pieternella	21 June 1986		Mexico City, Mexico	
400 m hurdles	1:02.16 A	Elisabeth Pieternella	22 June 1986		Mexico City, Mexico	
3000 m steeplechase						
High jump	1.62 m	Jeneree Wyatt	27 January 2007		Willemstad, Netherlands Antilles	
Pole vault						
Long jump	6.13 m (±0.0 m/s)	Meruskalem Eduarda	4 July 2010	Central American and Caribbean Junior Championships	Santo Domingo, Dominican Republic	
Triple jump	12.12 m (+0.9 m/s)	Meruskalem Eduarda	30 May 2010	European Champion Clubs Cup	Bern, Switzerland	
Shot put	12.70 m	Barbara Francisco	27 July 1989		San Juan, Puerto Rico	
Discus throw	41.04 m	Sherry Howell	9 April 1985		Bridgetown, Barbados	
Hammer throw						
Javelin throw	36.75 m	Carmen Martha	15 June 2001		Willemstad, Netherlands Antilles	
Heptathlon	4833 pts	Sherry Howe	24-25 July 1987		Caracas, Venezuela	
Heptathlon	100m H / High jump / Shot put / 200m / Long jump / Javelin / 800m; 15.81 / 1.57 m / 11.67 m / 26.63 / 5.20 m / 45.56 m / 2:35.67					
20 km walk (road)						
4 × 100 m relay	47.39	Netherlands Antilles	8 May 2010	Ponce Grand Prix	Ponce, Puerto Rico	
4 × 400 m relay	4:04.36	Netherlands Antilles; Vanessa Philbert; Jeneree Wyatt; S. Gijsberta; Lieshayra Dalnott	13 April 2009		Vieux Fort, Saint Lucia	

== Indoor ==
=== Men ===
Event	Record	Athlete	Date	Meet	Place	Ref.
60 m	6.58	Churandy Martina	6 February 2010	Sparkassen Cup	Stuttgart, Germany	
200 m	21.44	Jairo Duzant	28 February 2003		Nampa, United States	
200 m	21.23 OT	Churandy Martina	10 February 2006		Ames, United States	
400 m	48.45	Curtis Kock	7 February 2009		Lincoln, United States	
800 m						
1500 m						
3000 m						
50 m hurdles	6.82	James Sharpe	4 February 2000		Budapest, Hungary	
60 m hurdles	7.89	James Sharpe	16 January 1999		Budapest, Hungary	
High jump						
Pole vault						
Long jump	7.76 m	Ellsworth Manuel	19 February 1995		The Hague, Netherlands	
Triple jump						
Shot put						
Heptathlon						
Heptathlon	60m / Long jump / Shot put / High jump / 60m H / Pole vault / 1000m					
5000 m walk						
4 × 400 m relay						

=== Women ===
Event	Record	Athlete	Date	Meet	Place	Ref.
60 m	7.89	Martha Soraima	6 March 1987	World Championships	Indianapolis, United States	
200 m						
400 m	54.30	Florencia Hunt	9 March 2001		Boston, United States	
800 m	2:09.57	Florencia Hunt	19 January 2001		Blacksburg, United States	
1500 m						
3000 m						
60 m hurdles						
High jump						
Pole vault						
Long jump						
Triple jump						
Shot put						
Pentathlon						
Pentathlon	60m H / High jump / Shot put / Long jump / 800m					
3000 m walk						
4 × 400 m relay						
