= Garry Hoyt =

Puerto Rican sailor (1931–2025)

Personal information
- Full name: John Garrison Hoyt
- Nationality: American
- Born: April 7, 1931 Elizabeth, New Jersey, U.S.
- Died: March 31, 2025 (aged 93) Newport, Rhode Island, U.S.
- Height: 178 cm (5 ft 10 in)

Sport
- Sport: Sailing

John Garrison "Garry" Hoyt (April 7, 1931 – March 31, 2025) was an American and Puerto Rican sailor, Sailing Designer and author. He competed in the Finn at the 1968 Summer Olympics, and in the Tempest at the 1972 Summer Olympics and the 1976 Summer Olympics. He was also bronze medalist at the 1965 Snipe World Championship and won the first Sunfish World Championship in 1970. He founded Freedom Yachts in 1976. He was inducted into the National Sailing Hall of Fame in 2022.

Hoyt died on March 31, 2025 in Newport, Rhode Island, at the age of 93.
