= Constantino Saragoza =

Dutch Antillean windsurfer

Personal information
- Full name: Constantino Federico Saragosa
- Nationality: Bonairean
- Born: 18 July 1965 (age 60)

Sport

Sailing career
- Class(es): Funboard, Mistral, Lechner

Constantino "Patoen" Federico Saragoza (born 18 July 1965) is a Bonairean windsurfer. Domestically, he represented the Aquaspeed Windsurfing Club and was the 1986 North American Windsurfer National Champion. He was part of two teams for Netherlands Antilles at the Olympics, becoming the first Bonairean Olympian. After his career, he opened the Bonaire Windsurf Place.

== Biography ==
Constantino "Patoen" Federico Saragoza was born on 18 July 1965. Domestically, he represented the Aquaspeed Windsurfing Club. As an individual, he was the 1986 North American Windsurfer National Champion.

As part of the Aquaspeed Windsurfing Club, Saragoza and fellow Bonairean windsurfer Erwin Muller were the first two windsurfers to represent Bonaire in international competition, doing so at the 1987 Belmont Cup in Puerto la Cruz, Venezuela. The following year, they won the windsurfing category at the second holding of the Bonaire Regatta. Throughout his career, Saragoza competed in five Windsurfing World Championships.

Saragoza was later selected to compete for the Netherlands Antilles at the 1992 Summer Olympics in the men's Lechner A-930 class. There, he would become the first Bonairean Olympian. From 27 July to 4 August, Saragoza competed and earned a net total of 368 points throughout 10 races, placing 38th out of the 43 windsurfers that competed. He then competed at the 1996 Summer Olympics, again representing the Netherlands Antilles, doing so in the men's Mistral One Design class. There, he placed 37th out of the 46 windsurfers that competed.

After his career as a windsurfer, he and Elvis Martinus opened the Bonaire Windsurf Place. One of the events organized by them was to make windsurfing more accessible in Bonaire.
