= Churandy Martina =

Dutch sprinter (born 1984)

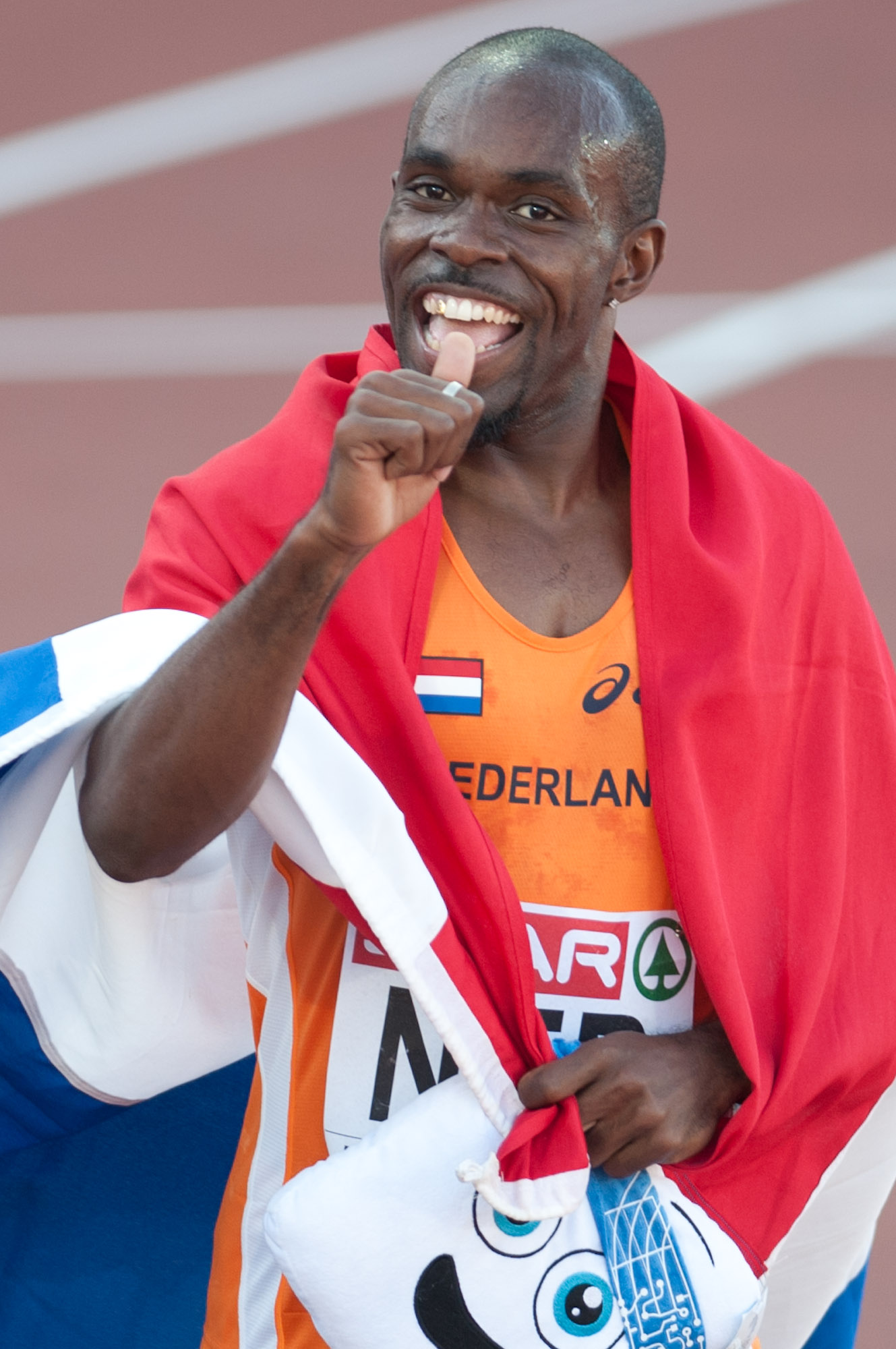
- Martina at the 2012 European Athletics Championships in Helsinki

Personal information
- Nationality: Dutch
- Born: 3 July 1984 (age 42) Willemstad, Netherlands Antilles
- Height: 1.78 m (5 ft 10 in)
- Weight: 74 kg (163 lb)

Sport
- Country: Netherlands
- Sport: Athletics
- Events: 100 metres, 200 metres

Achievements and titles
- Personal bests: 100 m: 9.91 NR (London 2012); 200 m: 19.81 NR (Lausanne 2016); 400 m: 46.13 (El Paso 2007); Indoors; 60 m: 6.58 (Stuttgart 2010)
Medal record
Men's athletics
Representing the Netherlands Antilles
Pan American Games
Gold medal – first place	2007 Rio de Janeiro	100 m
Central American and Caribbean Games
Gold medal – first place	2006 Cartagena	100 m
Gold medal – first place	2006 Cartagena	4 × 100 m relay
Gold medal – first place	2010 Mayaguez	100 m
Gold medal – first place	2010 Mayaguez	200 m
Bronze medal – third place	2010 Mayaguez	4 × 100 m relay
South American Games
Gold medal – first place	2002 Belém	100 m
Silver medal – second place	2002 Belém	200 m
IAAF Continental Cup
Silver medal – second place	2010 Split	200 m
Pan American Junior Championships
Gold medal – first place	2003 Bridgetown	100 m
CARIFTA Games (U20)
Silver medal – second place	2003 Port of Spain	100 m
CARIFTA Games (U17)
Silver medal – second place	2000 St. George's	100 m
Silver medal – second place	2000 St. George's	200 m
Representing Netherlands
European Championships
Gold medal – first place	2012 Helsinki	200 m
Gold medal – first place	2012 Helsinki	4 × 100 m relay
Gold medal – first place	2016 Amsterdam	100 m
Bronze medal – third place	2018 Berlin	4 × 100 m relay

Churandy Thomas Martina (born 3 July 1984) is a retired Dutch sprinter. He originally placed second in the 200 metres at the 2008 Beijing Olympics but was later disqualified due to a lane violation. Martina secured four and two individual top-five finishes at the Summer Olympics and World Athletics Championships respectively. He was the 100 metres 2007 Pan American Games champion representing the Netherlands Antilles and claimed three individual titles at the Central American and Caribbean Games. He won gold medals in the 200 m and 100 m at the 2012 and 2016 European Athletics Championships respectively.

Martina is the Dutch national record holder for the 100 and 200. His 100 m 9.91-second record was set at the 2012 London Olympics semi-final and 200 m 19.81-second record was achieved at the Diamond League meeting in Lausanne, Switzerland in 2016. He won 13 Dutch national titles. Martina hails from Curaçao and represented the Netherlands Antilles until its dissolution in 2010.

== Career ==
Born in Willemstad, Curaçao, Martina began his international career at the youth level, reaching the 100 metres semifinals of the 1999 World Youth Championships in Athletics. Moving up to the junior level, he ran at the World Junior Championships in Athletics in 2000 and 2002, although he was less successful at that level. His first gold came in the 100 m at the 2002 South American Games in Belém, Brazil. He improved his personal best to 10.29 seconds in 2003, and represented the Netherlands Antilles at the 2003 CAC Championships (setting a personal best in the heats), and also competed at the 2003 Pan American Games (reaching the semis). He made his first appearance on the world stage at the 2003 World Championships in Athletics, although he was eliminated in the heats of the 100 metres.

He made his first Olympic appearance as one of three competitors representing the Netherlands Antilles at the 2004 Summer Olympics. He bore their flag in the opening ceremony. The 2004 season also saw much improvement in his times as he knocked 0.16 off his previous year's personal record with a 10.13-second run in Santo Domingo. Martina won the 100 m bronze medal at the 2005 Central American and Caribbean Championships and also anchored the Netherlands Antilles team to a national record time in the 4 × 100 metres relay to win a silver medal. He led the team to the final at the 2005 World Championships in Athletics and improved the national record further to 38.45 seconds for sixth place. He competed in the individual 100 m but was knocked out in the second round.

Martina was an All-American sprinter for the UTEP Miners track and field team, finishing 4th in the 200 m and 3rd in the 4 × 100 m relay at the 2006 NCAA Division I Outdoor Track and Field Championships.

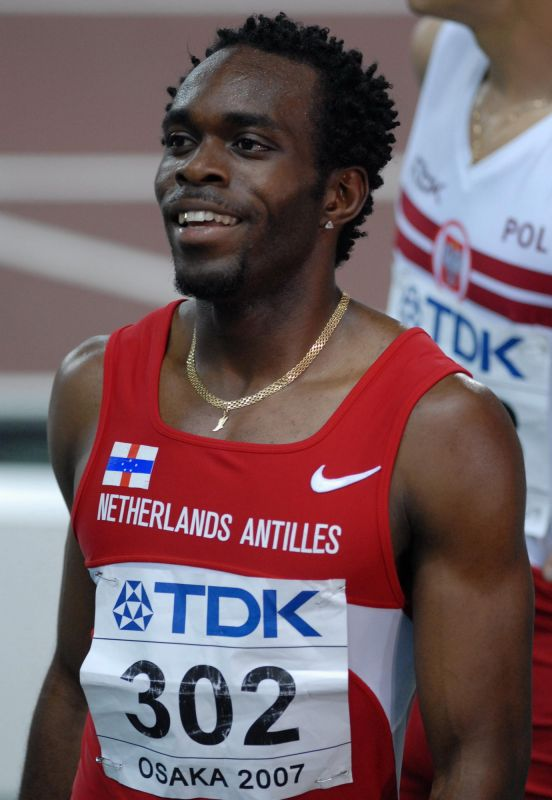
Martina took fifth place twice at the 2007 World Championships in Athletics in Osaka.

The following year he ran a Games record to win the 100 m gold medal at the 2006 Central American and Caribbean Games (CAC Games). He also led the relay team to victory for his second gold medal of the tournament. He improved his personal best to 10.04 seconds that year with a run in El Paso, Texas. He had success at continental level in July 2007 when he won the gold medal at the 2007 Pan American Games in the 100 metres, having already run a Games record-equalling time in the qualifiers. He finished fifth in the finals of both the 100 m and 200 m at the 2007 World Championships in Osaka, Japan. He ended the year with a sixth-place finish in the 100 m at the 2007 IAAF World Athletics Final.

=== 2008 Summer Olympics ===
He bore the national flag for the second consecutive time at the 2008 Summer Olympics in Beijing. In the second round of heats he set a new national record in the 100 m, running below ten seconds for the first time in his career with a time of 9.99 s. In the semi-finals he finished third in his race behind Asafa Powell and Richard Thompson, but improved the national record to 9.94 s. He qualified for the final in which he came close to the medals, finishing in fourth place behind Usain Bolt, Thompson and Walter Dix. Whilst he left the final without a medal, he had cause for celebration as he broke the national record for a third time, finishing in 9.93 s.

On 20 August 2008, he originally placed second in the 200 m at the Olympics, finishing behind Usain Bolt with a time of 19.82 s. This would have been both a national record and the second-ever Olympic medal for the Netherlands Antilles after Jan Boersma's silver in the 1988 Summer Olympics in Seoul. However he was disqualified an hour after the race for a lane violation. American Wallace Spearmon, who had initially placed third, was disqualified moments after the race for having stepped on his inside lane line during the race. The American coaches appealed the decision and upon viewing footage of Spearmon's offence they noticed that Martina had committed the same infraction. They dropped their appeal for Spearmon in favour of a successful protest against Martina. As a result of the disqualifications, Shawn Crawford and Walter Dix, both of the United States, were promoted to silver and bronze respectively.

However, on 24 August, the Netherlands Antilles filed an appeal to the Court of Arbitration for Sport to reinstate Martina's medal, arguing that the American protest came after the 30-minute deadline for protests and appeals set by the International Association of Athletics Federations (IAAF), and also that they had their own video footage (not the official Olympic video footage) showing that Martina never left his lane. On 6 March 2009, the CAS rejected the appeal against Martina's disqualification. Shawn Crawford, who had been awarded the Olympic silver medal, reportedly gave his medal to Martina on 28 August 2008.

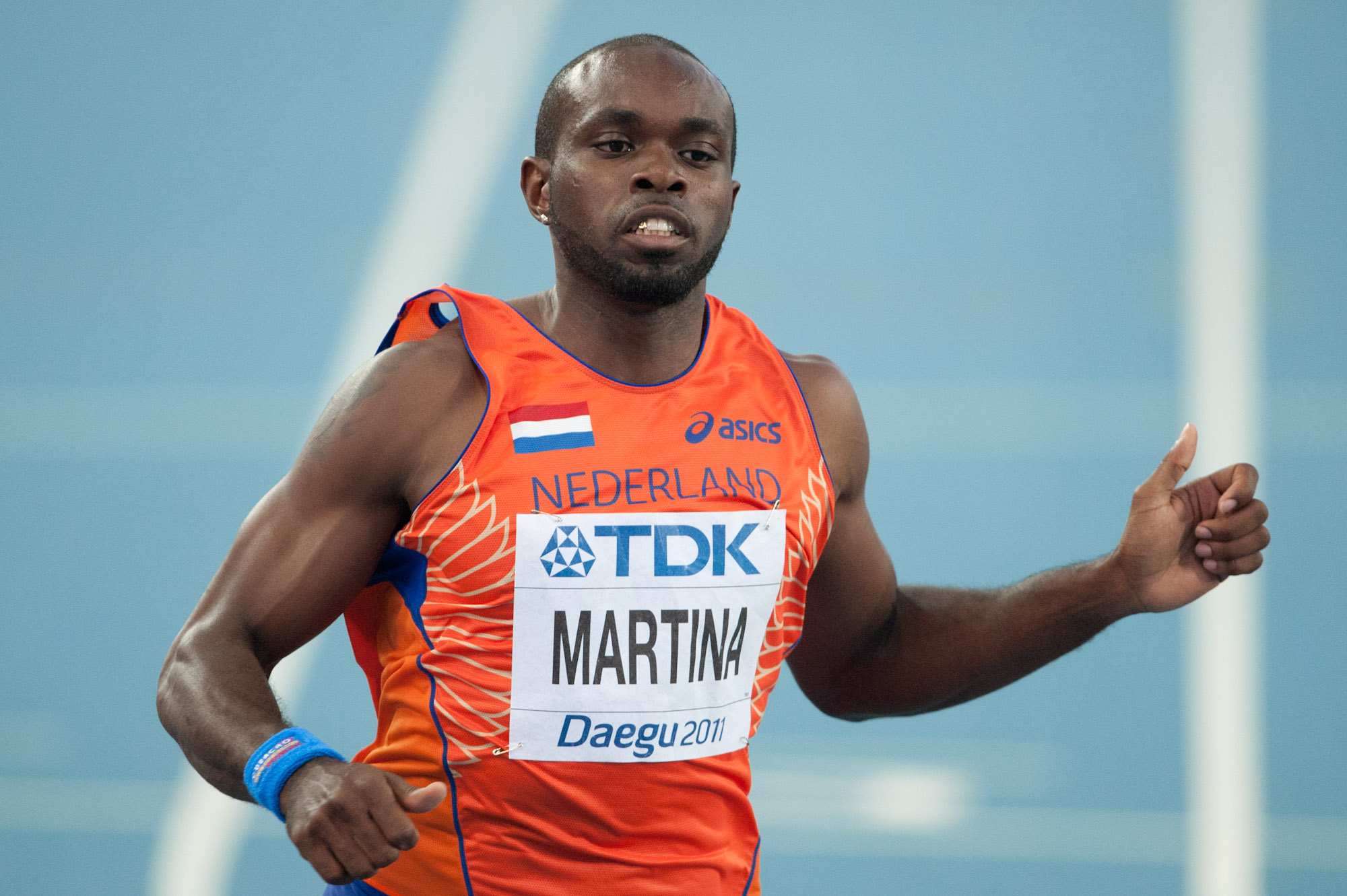
Since 2011, Churandy Martina has represented Netherlands. Pictured (R) at the 2011 World Championships in Athletics held in Daegu.

At the start of the 2009 outdoor season, Martina set a world-leading time of 9.97 seconds in the 100 m at the Fanny Blankers-Koen Games; the fourth time he had finished with a sub-ten-second time. He could not build upon his Olympic success at the 2009 World Championships in Athletics and only reached the quarter-finals of the men's 100 m. He was sixth at the 2009 IAAF World Athletics Final—the competition's final edition. He defended his regional title at the 2010 Central American and Caribbean Games, holding off a challenge from Daniel Bailey to win in 10.07 seconds—just one hundredth off his championship record.

After the dissolution of the Netherlands Antilles, Martina has represented the Netherlands in 2011 World Championships and 2012 European Championships, where he won gold in 200 metres and 4 × 100 metre relay.

=== 2012 Summer Olympics ===
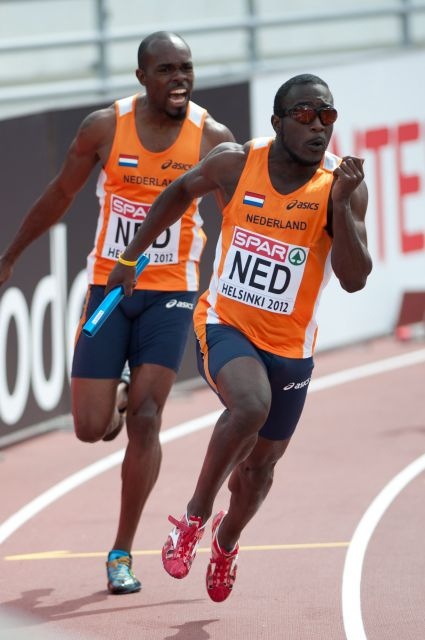
Martina (L) passes the baton to Jerrel Feller (R) at the 2012 European Athletics Championships in Helsinki.

Martina competed at the London 2012 Summer Olympics, again in his three disciplines, the 100 metres, 200 metres and 4 × 100 metre relay. Only narrowly making it through to the 100-metre semi-final, Martina improved his personal best in the semi-final to 9.91. This race was also the fastest ever semi-final run, with Justin Gatlin running 9.82. In the final, Martina placed sixth behind Usain Bolt, posting 9.94. Martina then competed in the 200 m, where he finished in fifth, again behind Bolt, in 20 seconds flat. In the relay, the Netherlands finished sixth in a time of 38.39. However, after the Olympics, Martina broke the 200 m national record in Lausanne, lowering the time to 19.85, ending his reasonably successful season.

In 2016, Martina won the European Championships 100 metres before a home crowd. The following day, he crossed the line in first place in the 200 metres, but was denied the sprint double because he crossed inside of his lane line again, giving the win to Bruno Hortelano.

== Personal bests ==
All information from World Athletics profile unless otherwise noted.

Event	Time	Location	Date	Notes
30 metres indoor	3.81	Leeuwarden, Netherlands	14 November 2008	World best
60 metres indoor	6.58	Stuttgart, Germany	6 February 2010	Netherlands Antillean record
100 metres	9.76 w	El Paso, Texas, United States	13 May 2006	Wind assisted: +6.1 m/s
100 metres	9.91	London, United Kingdom	5 August 2012	Dutch record
200 metres	19.81	Lausanne, Switzerland	25 August 2016	Dutch record
400 metres	46.13	El Paso, Texas, United States	31 March 2007	Netherlands Antillean record

== Competition results ==
All information from World Athletics profile unless otherwise noted.

=== International competitions ===
Year	Competition	Venue	Position	Event	Time	Notes
Representing Netherlands Antilles (until 2010)
2000	CARIFTA Games	St. George's, Grenada, Grenada	2nd	100 m	10.73	(+1.5 m/s)
2000	CARIFTA Games	St. George's, Grenada, Grenada	2nd	200 m	21.73	(+1.7 m/s)
2000	World Junior Championships	Santiago, Chile	36th (h)	100 m	10.77	(+0.8 m/s)
2000	World Junior Championships	Santiago, Chile	DSQ	200 m	DQ	
2002	World Junior Championships	Kingston, Jamaica	19th (qf)	100 m	10.52	w (+2.6 m/s)
2002	South American Games	Belém, Brazil	1st	100 m	10.42	(+0.8 m/s)
2002	South American Games	Belém, Brazil	2nd	200 m	20.81	(+1.1 m/s)
2002	Central American and Caribbean Games	San Salvador, El Salvador	8th	100 m	10.55	w (+2.1 m/s)
2002	Central American and Caribbean Games	San Salvador, El Salvador	8th	200 m	21.89	(-0.4 m/s)
2002	Central American and Caribbean Games	San Salvador, El Salvador	6th	4 × 100 m relay	42.14	
2003	CARIFTA Games	Port of Spain, Trinidad and Tobago	2nd	100 m	10.37	w (+3.8 m/s)
2003	World Championships	Paris, France	5th (h)	100 m	10.35	(-0.6 m/s)
2004	South American U23 Championships	Barquisimeto, Venezuela	1st	4 × 100 m relay	39.18	
2004	NACAC U-23 Championships	Sherbrooke, Canada	1st	100 m	10.21	(+0.1 m/s)
2004	NACAC U-23 Championships	Sherbrooke, Canada	2nd	200 m	20.75	(+0.0 m/s)
2004	Olympic Olympics	Athens, Greece	7th (qf)	100 m	10.48	(0.0 m/s)
2005	World Championships	Helsinki, Finland	6th (qf)	100 m	10.24	(-1.2 m/s)
2005	World Championships	Helsinki, Finland	6th	4 × 100 m relay	38.45	
2005	CAC Championships	Nassau, Bahamas	3rd	100 m	10.10	(+1.9 m/s)
2006	Central American and Caribbean Games	Cartagena, Colombia	1st	100 m	10.06 s	(+0.6 m/s) CR
2006	Central American and Caribbean Games	Cartagena, Colombia	1st	4 × 100 m relay	39.29	
2007	Pan American Games	Rio de Janeiro, Brazil	1st	100 m	10.15	(+1.0 m/s)
2007	World Championships	Osaka, Japan	5th	100 m	10.08	(-0.5 m/s)
2007	World Championships	Osaka, Japan	5th	200 m	20.28	(-0.8 m/s)
2008	Olympic Games	Beijing, China	4th	100 m	9.93	(+0.0 m/s)
2008	Olympic Games	Beijing, China	DSQ	200 m	DQ	
2009	World Championships	Berlin, Germany	4th (qf)	100 m	10.19	(+0.1 m/s)
2010	World Indoor Championships	Doha, Qatar	8th (sf)	60 m	6.65	
2010	Central American and Caribbean Games	Mayagüez, Puerto Rico	1st	100 m	10.07	(+0.7 m/s)
2010	Central American and Caribbean Games	Mayagüez, Puerto Rico	1st	200 m	20.25	(+0.0 m/s)
2010	Central American and Caribbean Games	Mayagüez, Puerto Rico	3rd	4 × 100 m relay	38.82	
2010	2010 IAAF Continental Cup	Split, Croatia	2nd	200 m	20.47	
Representing Netherlands (since 2011)
2011	World Championships	Daegu, South Korea	18th (sf)	100 m	10.29	(-0.8 m/s)
2011	World Championships	Daegu, South Korea	– (sf)	200 m	DNS	
2012	European Championships	Helsinki, Finland	1st	200 m	20.42	(-0.9 m/s)
2012	European Championships	Helsinki, Finland	1st	4 × 100 m relay	38.34	
2012	Olympic Games	London, United Kingdom	6th	100 m	9.94	(+1.5 m/s)
2012	Olympic Games	London, United Kingdom	5th	200 m	20.00	(+0.4 m/s)
2012	Olympic Games	London, United Kingdom	6th	4 × 100 m relay	38.39	
2014	European Championships	Zurich, Switzerland	9th (sf)	100 m	10.34	(+0.6 m/s)
2014	European Championships	Zurich, Switzerland	4th	200 m	20.37	(-1.6 m/s)
2014	European Championships	Zurich, Switzerland	5th	4 × 100 m relay	38.60	
2015	World Championships	Beijing, China	16th (sf)	100 m	10.09	(-0.4 m/s)
2015	World Championships	Beijing, China	10th (sf)	200 m	20.20	(+0.4 m/s)
2016	World Indoor Championships	Portland, OR, United States	22nd (h)	60 m	6.67	
2016	European Championships	Amsterdam, Netherlands	1st	100 m	10.07	(0.0 m/s)
2016	European Championships	Amsterdam, Netherlands	DSQ	200 m	20.37	(-0.9 m/s)
2016	European Championships	Amsterdam, Netherlands	4th	4 × 100 m relay	38.57	
2016	Olympic Games	Rio de Janeiro, Brazil	26th (h)	100 m	10.22	(-0.5 m/s)
2016	Olympic Games	Rio de Janeiro, Brazil	5th	200 m	20.13	(-0.5 m/s)
2017	World Relays	Nassau, Bahamas	4th (h)	4 × 100 m relay	38.71	(Note: Did not finish in the final.)
2018	European Championships	Berlin, Germany	6th	100 m	10.16	(0.0 m/s)
2018	European Championships	Berlin, Germany	10th (sf)	200 m	20.51	(+0.3 m/s)
2018	European Championships	Berlin, Germany	3rd	4 × 100 m relay	38.03	
2019	World Relays	Yokohama, Japan	10th (h)	4 × 100 m relay	38.67	
2019	World Championships	Doha, Qatar	7th (h)	4 × 100 m relay	37.91	(Note: Disqualified in the final.)
2021	World Relays	Chorzów, Poland	5th (h)	4 × 100 m relay	38.79	
2021	Olympic Games	Tokyo, Japan	–	4 × 100 m relay	DNF	

=== Circuit wins, National titles ===
- Diamond League
  - 2012: New York Grand Prix (200 m, NR)
  - 2013: Lausanne Athletissima (200 m, SB)
  - 2016: Rome Golden Gala (4 × 100 m relay), Lausanne (200 m, NR)
- Dutch Athletics Championships
  - 100 metres (7): 2011, 2012, 2013, 2014, 2015, 2016, 2018
  - 200 metres (6): 2011, 2014, 2016, 2018, 2019, 2021

== Notes ==
Awards
Preceded by Eelco Sintnicolaas	Men's Dutch Athlete of the Year; 2012; 2016	Succeeded by Ignisious Gaisah
Preceded by Liemarvin Bonevacia	Men's Dutch Athlete of the Year; 2012; 2016	Succeeded by Menno Vloon
Olympic Games
Preceded by Cor van Aanholt	Flagbearer for Netherlands Antilles; Athens 2004; Beijing 2008	Netherlands Antilles withdrew from IOC in 2011
Preceded by Jeroen Dubbeldam	Flagbearer for Netherlands; Tokyo 2020; With: Keet Oldenbeuving	Most recent
