= David Mendelblatt =

American yachtsman and ophthalmologist

Personal information
- Full name: David J. Mendelblatt
- Nationality: American

Sport
- Sport: Sailing
- Event: Sunfish
- College team: Tufts University
- Club: St. Petersburg Yacht Club

Achievements and titles
- World finals: 1985 International Optimist World Championships, team; third place; 2006 (second), 2009 (third), and 2010 (second) in the Sunfish World Championships
- National finals: 1985 Optimist Pram National Champion; 1988 National Interscholastic High School Sailing Champions, four-person team; 1991 US Sailing Team Racing Champions, team; 1992 collegiate All-American

David J. Mendelblatt is an American yachtsman and ophthalmologist.

He is a former Optimist Pram National Champion. He came in second in the Sunfish World Championship in 2006, third in 2009, and second again in 2010.

== Personal life ==
Mendelblatt is the older brother of Olympic sailor Mark Mendelblatt. He attended Tufts University, where he was an All-American in 1992.

He received his medical degree from the University of South Florida College of Medicine, performed his residency at the University of Texas Southwestern Medical Center, and is an ophthalmologist. His father, Frank, is also an ophthalmologist, and his mother, Kathy, supervises their practice. He lives in St. Petersburg, Florida.

== Sailing career ==
=== 1985–1991: early career ===
In 1985, at the age of 15, Mendelblatt was part of a five-person U.S. Optimist dinghy team, along with his brother Mark, that took third place in the 25th International Optimist World Championships in team racing in Finland. It was the best U.S. finish ever in dinghy racing. He also won the Optimist Pram National Championship, over his brother Mark who came in second.

In 1987, Mendelblatt and Caj Flynn won the Bemis Cup, the most prestigious junior sailing race in the US, in Massachusetts. In 1988, Mendelbatt was part of a four-person team from St. Petersburg High School that won the 1988 National Interscholastic High School Sailing Championships, in Annapolis, Maryland. He was a winner of the ISSA's Mallory Trophy, school sailing's oldest trophy.

In 1989, at the age of 19, he teamed with his 16-year-old brother Mark to outrace 21 other entries and win the Laser II North American Championships in Maryland. In 1990, he was honored as first-place skipper in the Laser II North American Championships. In 1991, he was part of the team that won the US Sailing Team Racing Championship, the "George R. Hinman Trophy".

=== 1995–present: Sunfish ===
In 1995, Mendelblatt won the United States Sunfish Midwinters with a near-perfect score, against 88 other boats.

In 2006, he came in second in the Sunfish World Championship. He also won the Florida Southeast Regional title for the third time. In 2006 and 2007, he won the Florida State Sunfish Championship.

In 2009, he came in third in the Sunfish World Championship, in the Bahamas. In 2010, he came in second in the Sunfish World Championship in Italy to Jonathan Martinetti, of Ecuador.

== See also ==
- List of select Jews in sailing
