= Andy Pimental =

Personal information
- Nationality: American

Sailing career
- Sport: Sailing
- Class(es): Sunfish, Laser, Snipe

Andrew Pimental is a world champion American sailor and boat builder, and the owner of Jibetech.,

He became Sunfish world champion in 1984 at Kingston, Ontario, and was second in 1986 at the Barrington Yacht Club.

Andy Pimental also won the United States Snipe National Championship in 2003 with Kathleen Tocke, and was second in 1992 and in 1993 with Carol Cronin.

In the masters category, Pimental won the Laser Masters North American Championships in 2003.

He was one of the six men considered for the 2003 Rolex Yachtsman of the Year together with final winner Snipe World Champion Augie Diaz; Pan Am Games Gold Medallist Tim Healy (Newport, R.I.); ISAF Match Racing World Champion Andy Horton (Shelburne, Vt.); J/80 World and Lightning World Champion Jay Lutz (Houston, Texas); Around Alone Race winner in class two, Brad Van Liew (Mt. Pleasant, S.C.), and Etchells 22 World Champion Ken Read (Newport, R.I.), who had previously won this award in 1985 and 1994.
