= Jeanne Lopes =

Dutch sport shooter

Personal information
- Nationality: Dutch
- Born: 22 July 1947 (age 77); Netherlands Antilles

Sport
- Sport: Sports shooting

Jeanne Yvette Lopes (born 22 July 1947) is a Dutch sport shooter. She competed in rifle shooting events at the 1988 Summer Olympics.

== Olympic results ==
Event	1988
10 metre air rifle (women)	45th
