= Paul Dielemans =

Dutch Antillean sailor

Personal information
- Nationality: Dutch Antillean
- Born: 4 January 1957 (age 69)

Sport
- Sport: Sailing

Paulus "Paul" Dielemans (born 4 January 1957) is a Dutch Antillean sailor. He won a bronze medal at the 1993 Central American and Caribbean Games and competed in the Laser event at the 1996 Summer Olympics.
