= Pierre Siegenthaler =

Swiss sailor

Personal information
- Nationality: Swiss
- Born: 19 July 1938 (age 86); Bern, Switzerland

Sport
- Sport: Sailing

Pierre Siegenthaler (born 19 July 1938) is a Swiss sailor. He competed in the Flying Dutchman event at the 1960 Summer Olympics.
