= Max Stibbe =

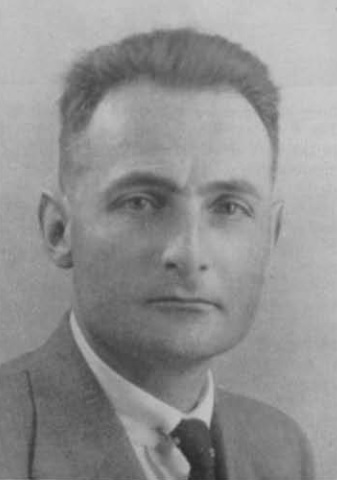
M.L. Stibbe

Max Leon Stibbe (11 June 1898 – 20 August 1973) was a Dutch anthroposophist and educationist.

Stibbe was born in Padang, Dutch East Indies, the oldest child of David Stibbe, Colonial History Professor and Inspector of Labour, and Marie Knoch. In 1913 he moved from the East Indies to the Netherlands for further education. He studied law, but after working for a year at a law office switched his career to education. In 1923 he became co-founder and teacher at the first Dutch Waldorf school, 'De Vrije School' at The Hague. Because of his Jewish heritage, he left Europe in 1939 for Batavia, where he started an educational consultancy and soon after the Japanese occupation was interned in a camp. From 1947 he worked again in the Netherlands in education. As an active anthroposophist, he wrote a number of books, including Seven Soul Types, The Physiognomy of Europe and Kasper Hauser, as well as essays on pedagogical topics.

In the 1960s he traveled the world, and after a few years in Brazil he settled in South Africa. There he established the Fountain Waldorf School in Pretoria, South Africa in 1972. He died, aged 75, in Pretoria, South Africa. After his death, the school was renamed the Max Stibbe School in his honour.
