= Philipine van Aanholt =

Curaçaoan sailor

Personal information
- Born: 26 May 1992 (age 34) Utrecht, Netherlands
- Height: 1.71 m (5 ft 7 1/2 in)
- Weight: 62 kg (137 lb)

Sport
- Country: Curaçao
- Sport: Sailing
- Event: Laser Radial
- Club: Youth Sailing Curaçao
- Coached by: Javier "Rulo" Borojovich
Medal record
Sailing
World Championships in Sailing
Gold medal – first place	2008 Tavira	Splash girls
Silver medal – second place	2009 Pwllheli	Splash girls
Gold medal – first place	2009 Nasau	Sunfish women
Bronze medal – third place	2012 Boltenhagen	Laser radial U21
Pan American Games
Silver medal – second place	2023 Santiago	Women's Sunfish
Central American & Caribbean Games
Gold medal – first place	2014 Veracruz	Laser radial

Philipine van Aanholt (born 26 May 1992) is a sailor from Curaçao, competing mainly in the Laser Radial class. She is a two-time Women World Champion in non-Olympic classes. In 2008 and 2009 she was chosen Curaçao's Youth Sports Women of the year. After the National Olympic Committee of the Netherlands Antilles lost its recognition by the International Olympic Committee following the dissolution of the Netherlands Antilles in 2010, van Aanholt was allowed to participate in the 2012 Summer Olympics as an Independent Olympic Athlete. In 2016, she represented neighboring island Aruba at the Summer Olympics in Rio de Janeiro. She was Aruba's flag bearer at the opening ceremony of the 2015 Pan American Games. In 2023, she won silver in the Sunfish class at the 2023 Pan American Games in Santiago, Chile.

== Sports career ==
Van Aanholt started sailing from an early age, in the Optimist. At the age of 12 she competed at her first World Championship in Ecuador. She moved on to the Splash, in this class she claimed her first World Championship title in 2008. The next year, she placed second in the Splash and earned her second World Championship title in the Sunfish.

From 2009 forward, she was mainly active in the Laser Radial class. In this class she competed in five world championships and two Olympic Games.

In 2011, she finished 5th in the Guadalajara Pan American Games and won the medal race.

At the age of 19 she qualified for the London 2012 Olympics, in which she competed as an Independent Olympic Athlete. She finished in 36th place out of 41 competitors overall, with a 16th place as her best result in race 7.

Van Aanholt was a gold medalist at the Central American & Caribbean Games 2014 in Veracruz, Mexico.

At the opening ceremony of the 2015 Pan American Games in Toronto, Van Aanholt was Aruba's flag bearer and finished 4th overall.

In the Rio 2016 Olympics, she represented neighboring island Aruba and finished 28th out of 37 competitors overall.

Van Aanholt serves as the athlete representative at the executive board of Panam Sailing (2019–2023).

== Professional career ==
Van Aanholt holds a bachelor's degree in business from the University of Groningen, a master's degree in Environmental & Resource Management with a specialization in Energy from the Vrije Universiteit Amsterdam. She also has a Private Pilot License.

In 2018, she started her professional career as an Analyst and Project Manager at a Private Equity firm. She moved on as investment specialist at sustainable crowdfunding platform OnePlanetCrowd and Impact fund manager StartGreen Capital.

In 2021 Van Aanholt became Head of Sales and Business Development at AMDAX, the first company to receive a full Crypto Service Provider Registration from De Nederlandsche Bank (DNB).

== Family ==
Her father is Cor van Aanholt who was also a competitive sailor having participated in the 2000 Summer Olympics in the Laser class and flag bearer at Sydney 2000. He has also won the Sunfish World Championship, This led to him being member of the Board of the World Olympians Association. She is the daughter of sports scientist Marjolein van Aanholt Grol.

She has three siblings who are also competitive sailors, some of their accomplishments:

- Brother Ard van Aanholt won a bronze medal in the Sunfish Class at the 2010 Central American and Caribbean Games in Mayagüez, Puerto Rico.
- Brother Just van Aanholt (1995) is an Olympian for Aruba and won silver at the 2010 Youth Olympics for the Netherlands Antilles.
- Sister Odile van Aanholt (1998) is an 2024 Olympic Gold Medallist and European Champion and World Champion in the 49erFX class. She carried the flag of The Netherlands at the Opening Ceremony of the 2014 Youth Olympics in Nanjing, where she also claimed a silver medal.
