= Ellsworth Manuel =

Dutch Antillian long jumper

Ellsworth Manuel (born 27 November 1968) is a retired Dutch Antillean long jumper.

Manuel won the bronze medal at the 1995 Central American and Caribbean Championships. He also competed at the 1995 World Championships, the 1996 Olympic Games, and the 1997 World Indoor Championships, without reaching the final.

His personal best jump was 7.68 metres in 1993.
