= Sergio Murray =

Dutch Antillean judoka

Personal information
- Nationality: Dutch Antillean
- Born: 20 April 1971 (age 53)

Sport
- Sport: Judo

Sergio Murray (born 20 April 1971) is a judoka from the Netherlands Antilles. He competed in the men's middleweight event at the 1996 Summer Olympics.
