= Evert Johan Kroon =

Dutch Antillean swimmer (born 1966)

Personal information
- Born: 9 December 1966 (age 59)

Sport
- Sport: Swimming

Evert Johan Kroon (born 9 December 1966) is a swimmer who represented the Netherlands Antilles. He competed in three events at the 1984 Summer Olympics.
