= Florencia Hunt =

Dutch Antillean middle-distance runner

Personal information
- Nationality: Dutch Antillean
- Born: 14 May 1978 (age 48)

Sport
- Sport: Middle-distance running
- Event: 800 metres

Florencia Hunt (born 14 May 1978) is a Dutch Antillean middle-distance runner. She competed in the women's 800 metres at the 2000 Summer Olympics. While planning to compete in the 2008 Summer Olympics, she was diagnosed with a cancer in her pelvic area that was compressing her sciatic nerve. She underwent surgery for her condition, which ultimately led to the loss of the use of her right leg. She later became a bodybuilder, regaining feeling in her leg after six years of chemotherapy.

As a bodybuilder, she competed in her first contest in 2016. She won her first contest that year, the National Physique Committee figure competition at the New England 35+ division. Hunt has since won competitions in Sint Maarten and Richmond, Virginia.
