= Bart Carpentier Alting =

Dutch Antillean sportsman

Albertus "Bart" Carpentier Alting (born 12 March 1954 in Willemstad) is a former luger and bobsledder from Curaçao. He represented his country at the 1988 Winter Olympics in Calgary and at the 1992 Winter Olympics in Albertville.

In 1988, Carpentier Alting finished in 36th place at men's singles luge. He and Bart Drechsel finished 29th in the two-man bobsleigh event.

The event included competitors from countries with little or no snow. These countries included Jamaica (whose involvement spurred the movie Cool Runnings), Mexico, and New Zealand. An informal "Caribbean Cup" of such countries was won by New Zealand's Alexander Peterson and Peter Henry, who finished equal twentieth. In the two-man event, the best result from a completely snow-less country was twenty-ninth by Bart Carpentier Alting and Bart Dreschsel of the Netherlands Antilles.

At the 1992 Olympics, Carpentier Alting and Dudley den Dulk were placed 29th in the two-man bobsleigh competition.
