= Dudley den Dulk =

Dutch sprinter

Personal information
- Nationality: Dutch, Curaçao
- Born: 24 June 1971 (age 54)

Sport
- Sport: Bobsleigh

Dudley den Dulk (born 24 June 1971) is a Curaçao sprinter who, with Bart Carpentier Alting, represented the Netherlands Antilles in the two man event at the 1992 Winter Olympics.
