= Eddy Stibbe =

Dutch equestrian

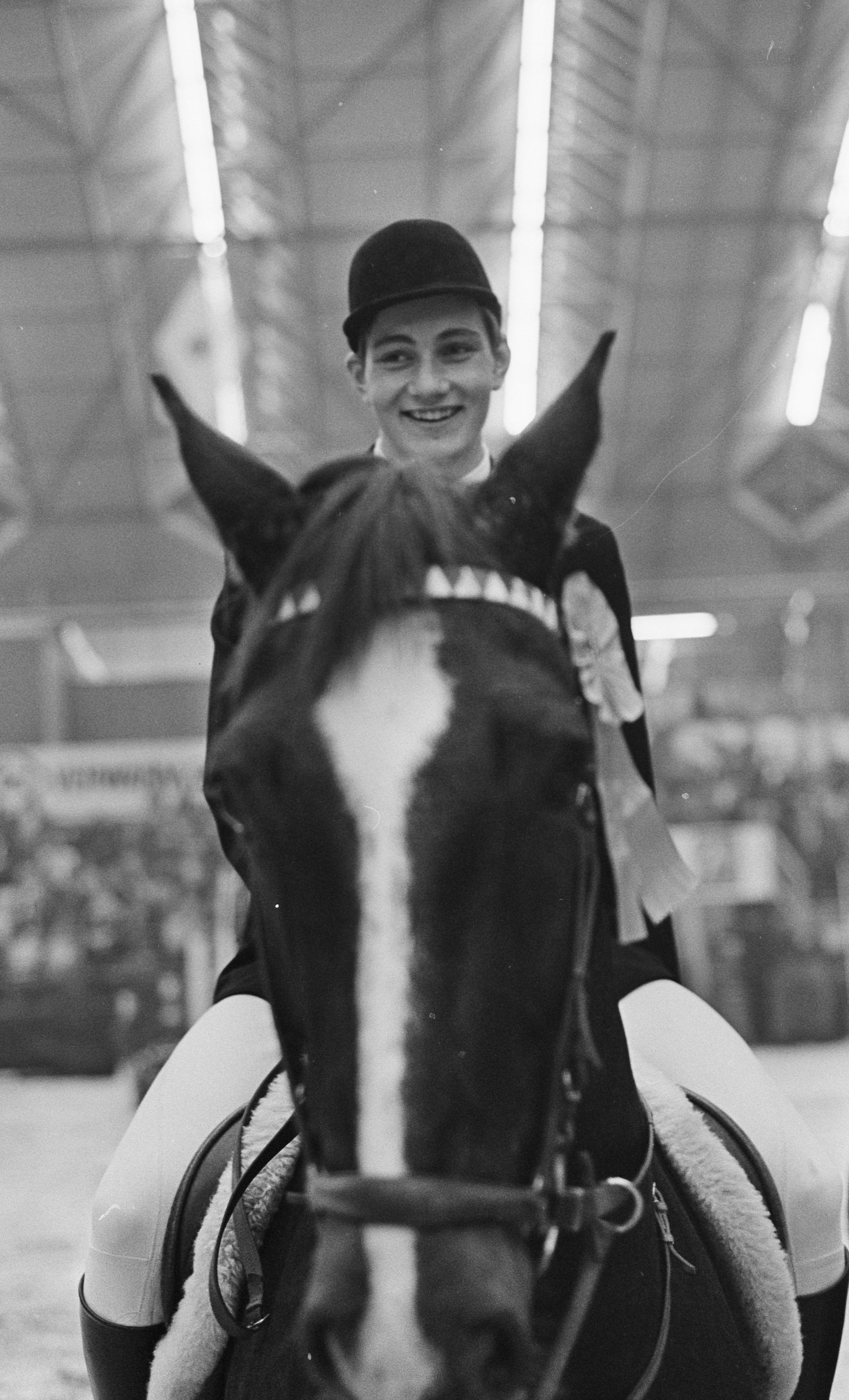
- Eddy Stibbe in 1966

Personal information
- Born: 1 November 1948 (age 77) 's-Hertogenbosch, the Netherlands
- Height: 1.85 m (6 ft 1 in)
- Weight: 87 kg (192 lb)

Sport
- Sport: Horse riding
Medal record
Equestrian
Representing the Netherlands
European Championships
Silver medal – second place	1989 Burghley	Team eventing
Bronze medal – third place	1993 Achselschwang	Individual eventing

Eduard Peter Nicolaas "Eddy" Stibbe (born 1 November 1948) is a Dutch-born equestrian. He competed in the mixed three-day event, individual and team, at the 1972, 1992, 2004 and 2004 Olympics with the best achievement of 13th place individual in 2000. While at the first two Games he represented the Netherlands, in 2000 and 2004 he competed for the Netherlands Antilles.

In 1974 Stibbe briefly competed for Ireland, due to a disagreement with the Dutch Equestrian Federation (NRSV), and since 1999 he decided to represent Netherlands Antilles because he was not selected for world championships by the NRSV. In 1989 he married Mandy Jeakins, a British rider he met in 1987, and since then resides in England. In 1994 he broke his leg in five places at a competition.

Stibbe's father Daddy Stibbe was a show-jumper and president of the NRSV.
