= Bart Drechsel =

Dutch bobsledder

Personal information
- Nationality: Curaçao
- Born: 24 September 1952 (age 73)

Sport
- Sport: Bobsleigh

Bart Drechsel (born 24 September 1952) is a bobsledder who represented the Netherlands Antilles in the two man event at the 1988 Winter Olympics.
