= Cor van Aanholt =

Dutch Antillean sailor

Personal information
- Nationality: Dutch Antillean
- Born: 29 March 1959 (age 67) Groningen, Netherlands

Sport
- Sport: Sailing

Cor van Aanholt (born 29 March 1959) is a sailor who represented the Netherlands Antilles. He competed in the Laser event at the 2000 Summer Olympics.

== Family ==
He has four children with sports scientist Marjolein van Aanholt Grol they are all competitive sailors, some of their accomplishments:

- Ard van Aanholt (AHO) competed in multiple saili nworld championships before becoming a Race Official and a Coach
- Philipine van Aanholt (ARU) (1992) Multiple Olympian competing as an independent athlete and then for Aruba
- Just van Aanholt (ARU) (1995) is an Olympian for Aruba and won silver at the 2010 Youth Olympics for the Netherlands Antilles.
- Odile van Aanholt (NED) (1998) is an 2024 Olympic Gold Medallist and European Champion and World Champion in the 49erFX class. She carried the flag of The Netherlands at the Opening Ceremony of the 2014 Youth Olympics in Nanjing, where she also claimed a silver medal.
