= Jan Boersma =

Dutch Antillean windsurfer (born 1968)

Medal record

Men's sailing

Representing Netherlands Antilles

Olympic Games
Silver medal – second place	1988 Seoul	Lechner Division II

Jan D. Boersma (born 1 November 1968) is a windsurfer from the Netherlands Antilles, who won a silver medal in Men's Lechner Sailboard in the 1988 Summer Olympics, his country's first and only Olympic medal.
