= Netherlands Antilles Olympic Committee =

Old national olympic committee

NAOC
- Country/Region: Netherlands Antilles
- Code: AHO
- Created: 1931
- Recognized: 1950
- Continental Association: PASO
- Dissolved: 2011
- Headquarters: Willemstad, Curaçao
- President: William Millerson

The Netherlands Antilles Olympic Committee, (Dutch: Nederlands Antilliaans Olympisch Comité; Papiamento: Comité Olímpico di Antia Hulandes) generally abbreviated NAOC was a member of the IOC from 1950 to 2011. It constituted the National Olympic Committee of the dissolved country Netherlands Antilles which consisted of the islands Aruba (until 1986), Curaçao, Sint Maarten (countries of the Kingdom of the Netherlands), Bonaire, Sint Eustatius and Saba (part of the Netherlands proper). The organization is a federation of 31 sports federations. So far only FINA, FIFA and CONCACAF recognize Curaçao as successor of Netherlands Antilles.

== After dissolution of the Netherlands Antilles ==
The committee planned to keep its function and name after the dissolution of the Netherlands Antilles as a regional indication of the five islands as it would be impossible for Curaçao or Sint Maarten to form their own recognized National Olympic Committee. On 13 January 2011, the IOC however indicated that no legal basis existed for membership of the IOC and confirmed that none of the individual islands could apply for membership following a 1995 decision that future membership is only open to sovereign countries. The executive board of the IOC proposed the withdrawal of the membership at the IOC session of July 2011 and took steps to allow athletes to compete at the 2011 Pan American Games (under the PASO flag) as well as the 2012 Olympic Games under the Olympic flag as Independent Olympic Athletes. After 2012, Netherlands Antilles athletes can choose to represent either the Netherlands or Aruba.

== See also ==
- Netherlands Antilles at the Olympics
- Netherlands Olympic Committee
- Aruban Olympic Committee
