= Independent Olympic Athletes at the 2012 Summer Olympics =

- Olympic Flag
- IOC code: IOA

in London
- Competitors: 4 in 3 sports
- Flag bearer: Brooklyn Kerlin
- Medals: Gold 0 Silver 0 Bronze 0 Total 0

Summer Olympics appearances (overview)
- 1992; 1996; 2000; 2004–2008; 2012; 2016; 2020; 2024

Other related appearances
- Netherlands Antilles (1952–2008); Aruba (1988–pres.); Netherlands (1900–pres.); Sudan (1960–pres.); South Sudan (2016–pres.)

Four independent Olympic Athletes competed at the 2012 Summer Olympics in London, the United Kingdom. These were athletes from the former Netherlands Antilles, and from the newly formed state of South Sudan. This was the third time that athletes had competed as independent participants in the Olympics. None of the athletes won an Olympic medal.

== Background ==
=== Netherlands Antilles ===
The Netherlands Antilles Olympic Committee, which had planned to continue functioning after the dissolution of the Netherlands Antilles in October 2010, had its membership withdrawn by the IOC Executive Committee at the IOC session of July 2011. However, athletes from the former Netherlands Antilles who qualified for the 2012 Olympics were allowed to participate independently under the Olympic flag, in addition to the possibility of competing for the Netherlands (as for example Churandy Martina did) or Aruba (because they have Dutch nationality). Ultimately, three athletes from the Netherlands Antilles participated as independent Olympic athletes.

=== South Sudan ===
South Sudan gained its independence from Sudan in July 2011. As of the 2012 Summer Olympics, it had not formed a National Olympic Committee. Athletes from this nation were therefore unable to enter with a National Olympic Committee (NOC). Guor Marial qualified for the men's marathon and competed as an independent Olympian.

== Opening ceremony ==
Brooklyn Kerlin was the flag bearer of the athletes during the opening ceremony. She was chosen by her peers to represent the "makers of the Olympics". Hannah Bailes, a London 2012 Ceremonies Cast Member, who was also a volunteer, was selected to carry the Independent Olympic Athletes placard.

== Sports ==
=== Athletics ===
Key

- Note–Ranks given for track events are within the athlete's heat only
- Q = Qualified for the next round
- N/A = Round not applicable for the event

Men

Athlete	From	Event	Heat		Semifinal		Final	
Athlete	From	Event	Result	Rank	Result	Rank	Result	Rank
Liemarvin Bonevacia	Curaçao	400 m	45.60	3 Q	1:36.42	8	Did not advance	
Guor Marial	South Sudan	Marathon	—N/a				2:19:32	47

=== Judo ===
Athlete	From	Event	Round of 64	Round of 32	Round of 16	Quarterfinals	Semifinals	Repechage	Final / BM	
Athlete	From	Event	Opposition Result	Opposition Result	Opposition Result	Opposition Result	Opposition Result	Opposition Result	Opposition Result	Rank
Reginald de Windt	Curaçao	Men's −81 kg	Bye	Nifontov (RUS); L 0004–1000	Did not advance					

=== Sailing ===
Women

Athlete	From	Event	Race											Net points	Final rank
Athlete	From	Event	1	2	3	4	5	6	7	8	9	10	M*	Net points	Final rank
Philipine van Aanholt	Curaçao	Laser Radial	36	~~38~~	38	29	33	37	16	27	42	37	EL	291	36

M = Medal race; EL = Eliminated – did not advance into the medal race;

== See also ==
- Independent Olympic Participants at the 1992 Summer Olympics
- Individual Olympic Athletes at the 2000 Summer Olympics
- Refugee Olympic Team at the 2016 Summer Olympics
