= Flag of the Netherlands Antilles =

National flag (1986–2010)

Netherlands Antilles
- 1959–1986
- Use: Civil and state flag
- Proportion: 2:3
- Adopted: 19 November 1959
- Relinquished: 1 January 1986
- Design: White, with a horizontal blue stripe in the center, one-third of the flag's hoist, superimposed on a vertical red stripe of the same width, also centered; six white, five-pointed stars are arranged in a hexagon pattern in the center of the blue band, their points up.
- 1986–2010
- Use: Civil and state flag
- Proportion: 2:3
- Adopted: 1 January 1986
- Relinquished: 10 October 2010
- Design: White, with a horizontal blue stripe in the center, one-third of the flag's hoist, superimposed on a vertical red stripe of the same width, also centered; five white, five-pointed stars are arranged in a pentagon pattern in the center of the blue band, their points up.

The flag of the Netherlands Antilles was the flag used by the Netherlands Antilles. It was white, with a horizontal blue stripe in the center, one-third of the flag's hoist, superimposed on a vertical red stripe of the same width, also centered; six white, five-pointed stars are arranged in a hexagon pattern in the center of the blue band, their points up. It was adopted on 15 December 1959.

== History ==
The flag of the Netherlands Antilles was first created as a separate flag as part of a royal decree by Queen Juliana of the Netherlands on 15 December 1959 to coincide with the fifth anniversary of the Netherlands Antilles' autonomy. The six stars represented the six main islands of Aruba, Bonaire, Curaçao, Saba, Sint Eustatius, and Sint Maarten. The colors red, white and blue refer to the Dutch flag. On 1 January 1986, Aruba seceded from the Netherlands Antilles having been granted status aparte, resulting in the flag being modified to depict only five stars to represent the remaining five islands.

== Dissolution of the Netherlands Antilles ==
On 10 October 2010, the Netherlands Antilles was dissolved into Curaçao, Sint Maarten and the three public bodies of the Caribbean Netherlands. During the dissolution ceremony in Curaçao, attended by then Crown Prince Willem-Alexander, the flag of the Netherlands Antilles was lowered with the flag of Curaçao raised in its place. Each part of the former Netherlands Antilles adopted their own separate flags as a result.

== Flag of the governor of the Netherlands Antilles ==
The governor of the Netherlands Antilles had his own flag.

Flag of the governor of the Netherlands Antilles (1966–1986)

Flag of the governor of the Netherlands Antilles (1986–2010)

== See also ==
- Flag of the Netherlands
  - Flag of Aruba
  - Flag of Bonaire
  - Flag of Curaçao
  - Flag of Saba
  - Flag of Sint Eustatius
  - Flag of Sint Maarten
