= Aruba at the 2027 Pan American Games =

- IOC code: ARU
- NOC: Aruban Olympic Committee

in Lima, Peru 2027 – 2027
- Competitors: 4 in 2 sports
- Medals: Gold 0 Silver 0 Bronze 0 Total 0

Pan American Games appearances (overview)
- 1987; 1991; 1995; 1999; 2003; 2007; 2011; 2015; 2019; 2023

Other related appearances
- Netherlands Antilles (1987–pres.)

Aruba is scheduled to compete at the 2027 Pan American Games in Lima, Peru from July 23 to August 8, 2027. This will be Aruba's 11th appearance at the Pan American Games, having competed at every edition of the Games since 1987.

== Competitors ==
The following is the list of number of competitors (per gender) participating at the games per sport/discipline.

Sport	Men	Women	Total
Bowling	0	2	2
Sailing	1	1	2
Total	1	3	4

== Bowling ==
Aruba qualified a team of two female bowlers through the 2026 South American Games.

Women

Athlete	Event	Ranking round																		Semifinal	Final	
Athlete	Event	Block 1								Block 2								Total	Rank	Opposition Result	Opposition Result	Rank
Athlete	Event	1	2	3	4	5	6	7	8	9	10	11	12	13	14	15	16	Total	Rank	Opposition Result	Opposition Result	Rank
	Singles																					
	Doubles																			—N/a		

== Sailing ==
Aruba qualified 2 boats for a total of 2 sailors.

Athlete	Event	Opening series																		Finals				
Athlete	Event	1	2	3	4	5	6	7	8	9	10	11	12	13	14	15	16	Points	Rank	QF	SF	M / F	Points	Rank
	Men's IQFoil																						—N/a	
Zara Rozeboom	Women's IQFoil																						—N/a	
