= Aruba at the 2025 World Aquatics Championships =

- Flag of Aruba
- World Aquatics code: ARU
- National federation: Aruba Aquatics Federation
- Website: arubaswimming.com

in Singapore
- Competitors: 6 in 3 sports
- Medals: Gold 0 Silver 0 Bronze 0 Total 0

World Aquatics Championships appearances
- 1973; 1975; 1978; 1982; 1986; 1991; 1994; 1998; 2001; 2003; 2005; 2007; 2009; 2011; 2013; 2015; 2017; 2019; 2022; 2023; 2024; 2025

Aruba is competing at the 2025 World Aquatics Championships in Singapore from 11 July to 3 August 2025.

== Competitors ==
The following is the list of competitors in the Championships.

Sport	Men	Women	Total
Artistic swimming	0	1	1
Open water swimming	0	1	1
Swimming	2	2	4
Total	2	4	6

== Artistic swimming ==
Women

Athlete	Event	Preliminary		Final	
Athlete	Event	Points	Rank	Points	Rank
Kyra Hoevertsz	Solo technical	229.3517	15	Did not advance	
Kyra Hoevertsz	Solo free	209.7838	12 Q	206.7925	12

== Open water swimming ==
Women

Athlete	Event	Final	
Athlete	Event	Time	Rank
Britta Schwengle	10 km	2:29:43.00	46

== Swimming ==
Men

Athlete	Event	Heat		Semifinal		Final	
Athlete	Event	Time	Rank	Time	Rank	Time	Rank
Patrick Groters	50 m backstroke	26.06	49	Did not advance			
Patrick Groters	100 m backstroke	55.95	41	Did not advance			
Patrick Groters	200 m medley	2:04.71	36	Did not advance			
Mikel Schreuders	50 m freestyle	22.02	19	Did not advance			
Mikel Schreuders	100 m freestyle	48.65	24	Did not advance			
Mikel Schreuders	50 m breaststroke	27.59	34	Did not advance			
Mikel Schreuders	50 m butterfly	23.80	35	Did not advance			

Women

Athlete	Event	Heat		Semifinal		Final	
Athlete	Event	Time	Rank	Time	Rank	Time	Rank
Elisabeth Timmer	50 m freestyle	26.25	45	Did not advance			
Elisabeth Timmer	100 m freestyle	58.01	45	Did not advance			
Avigayle Tromp	100 m breaststroke	1:12.25	47	Did not advance			
Avigayle Tromp	50 m butterfly	27.86	45 NR	Did not advance			

Mixed

Athlete	Event	Heat		Final	
Athlete	Event	Time	Rank	Time	Rank
Patrick Groters; Mikel Schreuders; Elisabeth Timmer; Avigayle Tromp	4 × 100 m freestyle relay	3:36.66 NR	21	Did not advance	
Patrick Groters; Mikel Schreuders; Elisabeth Timmer; Avigayle Tromp	4 × 100 m medley relay	3:59.70 NR	22	Did not advance	
