= Aruba at the 2017 World Aquatics Championships =

- Flag of Aruba
- World Aquatics code: ARU
- National federation: Aruban Swimming Federation
- Website: www.arubaswimming.com

in Budapest, Hungary
- Competitors: 5 in 2 sports
- Medals: Gold 0 Silver 0 Bronze 0 Total 0

World Aquatics Championships appearances
- 1973; 1975; 1978; 1982; 1986; 1991; 1994; 1998; 2001; 2003; 2005; 2007; 2009; 2011; 2013; 2015; 2017; 2019; 2022; 2023; 2024; 2025

Aruba is scheduled to compete at the 2017 World Aquatics Championships in Budapest, Hungary from 14 July to 30 July.

== Swimming ==
Aruba has received a Universality invitation from FINA to send a maximum of four swimmers (two men and two women) to the World Championships.

Athlete	Event	Heat		Semifinal		Final	
Athlete	Event	Time	Rank	Time	Rank	Time	Rank
Jordy Groters	Men's 50 m breaststroke	28.40	42	did not advance			
Jordy Groters	Men's 100 m breaststroke	1:02.95	46	did not advance			
Mikel Schreuders	Men's 100 m freestyle	50.12	50	did not advance			
Mikel Schreuders	Men's 200 m freestyle	1:49.66 NR	39	did not advance			
Allyson Ponson	Women's 50 m freestyle	26.76	44	did not advance			
Allyson Ponson	Women's 100 m freestyle	58.81	47	did not advance			
Daniella van den Berg	Women's 400 m freestyle	4:32.09	33	—N/a		did not advance	
Daniella van den Berg	Women's 800 m freestyle	9:17.77	35	—N/a		did not advance	
Jordy Groters; Mikel Schreuders; Allyson Ponson; Daniella van den Berg	Mixed 4×100 m freestyle relay	3:43.94	17	—N/a		did not advance	
Jordy Groters; Mikel Schreuders; Allyson Ponson; Daniella van den Berg	Mixed 4×100 m medley relay	4:16.69	21	—N/a		did not advance	

== Synchronized swimming ==
Aruba's synchronized swimming team consisted of 1 athlete (1 female).

Women

Athlete	Event	Preliminaries		Final	
Athlete	Event	Points	Rank	Points	Rank
Kyra Hoevertsz	Solo technical routine	72.0680	23	did not advance	
Kyra Hoevertsz	Solo free routine	72.7000	25	did not advance	
