= Aruba at the 2019 Pan American Games =

- IOC code: ARU
- NOC: Aruban Olympic Committee

in Lima, Peru 26 July–11 August, 2019
- Competitors: 21 in 8 sports
- Flag bearer: Mack van den Eerenbeemt (opening)
- Medals Ranked =30th: Gold 0 Silver 0 Bronze 1 Total 1

Pan American Games appearances (overview)
- 1987; 1991; 1995; 1999; 2003; 2007; 2011; 2015; 2019; 2023; 2027

Other related appearances
- Netherlands Antilles (1987–pres.)

Aruba competed at the 2019 Pan American Games in Lima, Peru from July 26 to August 11, 2019.

The Aruban team consisted of 21 athletes (consisting of 12 males and nine females).

During the opening ceremony of the games, sailor Mack van den Eerenbeemt carried the flag of the country as part of the parade of nations. Mack van den Eerenbeemt would later go on to win Aruba's first ever Pan American Games medal, a bronze in the rs:x event.

== Competitors ==
The following is the list of number of competitors (per gender) participating at the games per sport/discipline.

Sport	Men	Women	Total
Artistic swimming	—N/a	2	2
Athletics (track and field)	1	0	1
Bowling	2	2	4
Cycling	2	2	4
Judo	0	1	1
Karate	1	0	1
Sailing	2	1	3
Shooting	1	0	1
Swimming	2	1	3
Taekwondo	1	0	1
Total	12	9	21

== Medalists ==
The following competitors from Aruba won medals at the games. In the by discipline sections below, medalists' names are bolded.

Medal	Name	Sport	Event	Date
Bronze	Mack van den Eerenbeemt	Sailing	Men's RS:X	August 9

== Artistic swimming ==
Aruba qualified a duet of two athletes.

Women

Athlete	Event	Technical Routine		Free Routine (Final)			
Athlete	Event	Points	Rank	Points	Rank	Total Points	Rank
Abigail de Veer; Kyra Hoevertsz	Duet	73.1148	7	75.0333	8	148.1481	8

== Athletics (track and field) ==
Aruba qualified one male athlete.

Key

- Note–Ranks given for track events are for the entire round

Men
Field event

Athlete	Event	Final	
Athlete	Event	Distance	Position
Quincy Breell	Long jump	7.33	10

== Bowling ==
Aruba qualified two female bowlers through the 2018 South American Games. Aruba later qualified two men by finishing among the top five at the PABCON Champion of Champions.

Athlete	Event	Qualification / Final														Round robin											Semifinal	Final	
Athlete	Event	Block 1						Block 2						Total	Rank	Round robin											Semifinal	Final	
Athlete	Event	1	2	3	4	5	6	7	8	9	10	11	12	Total	Rank	1	2	3	4	5	6	7	8	Total	Grand total	Rank	Opposition Result	Opposition Result	Rank
Yannick Roos	Men's singles	197	139	183	205	247	193	192	209	237	204	146	210	2362	29	did not advance													
Jonathan Bremo	Men's singles	167	176	232	168	159	173	183	151	228	206	158	182	2183	31	did not advance													
Yannick Roos; Jonathan Bremo	Men's doubles	395	401	469	367	362	289	451	351	374	406	376	411	4652	13	—N/a													
Thashaina Seraus	Women's singles	268	186	196	246	169	258	176	216	195	205	268	229	2612	4 **Q**	184	192	207	207	254	192	179	247	1742	4354	5	did not advance		
Kamilah Dammers	Women's singles	169	181	171	238	199	258	171	201	196	214	279	200	2477	11	did not advance													
Thashaina Seraus; Kamilah Dammers	Women's doubles	433	375	396	460	345	436	333	436	422	510	384	414	4944	5	—N/a													

== Cycling ==
Aruba qualified two cyclists in the BMX discipline (one per gender). Aruba was later reallocated two quotas in road cycling (two per gender). Aruba therefore qualified four cyclists (two men and two women).

=== BMX ===
Athlete	Event	Time trial		Quarterfinal		Semifinal		Final	
Athlete	Event	Result	Rank	Points	Rank	Time	Rank	Time	Rank
Feddison Flanders	Men's BMX	35.435	15	11	4 **Q**	20	7	did not advance	
Shanayah Howell	Women's BMX	39.233	6	—N/a		9	3	38.630	5

=== Road ===
Athlete	Event	Final	
Athlete	Event	Time	Rank
Hillard Cijntje	Men's road race	DNF	
Hillard Cijntje	Men's time trial	50:39.76	18
Lisa Groothuesheidkamp	Women's road race	2:20:33	24
Lisa Groothuesheidkamp	Women's time trial	27:29.76	13

=== Track ===
Hillard Cijntje, who qualified in road cycling, also contested the ominium event in track cycling.

Men

Athlete	Event	Scratch		Tempo		Elimination		Points race		Total points
Athlete	Event	Points	Rank	Points	Rank	Points	Rank	Points	Rank	Total points
Hillard Cijntje	Omnium	18	12	14	14	22	10	-40	did not finish	

== Judo ==
Aruba qualified one female judoka.

Women

Athlete	Event	Preliminaries	Quarterfinals	Semifinals	Repechage	Final / BM	
Athlete	Event	Opposition Result	Opposition Result	Opposition Result	Opposition Result	Opposition Result	Rank
Sophia Petrocchi	57 kg	García (MEX); **L** 00S1–10	did not advance				

== Karate ==
Aruba qualified one male karateka. Jolano Lindelauf originally qualified under the Curacao flag, but since the island is not a member of Panamsports, Lindelauf chose to compete for Aruba.

Kumite
Men

Athlete	Event	Round Robin				Semifinals	Final	
Athlete	Event	Opposition Result	Opposition Result	Opposition Result	Rank	Opposition Result	Opposition Result	Rank
Jolano Lindelauf	–67 kg	Rodriguez (MEX); **L** 0–7	Figueira (BRA); **L** 0–8	Ferreras (DOM); **L** 1–7	4	did not advance		

== Sailing ==
Aruba qualified one male sailor in the rs:x event, after Mack Van Den Eerenbeemt won the 2018 South American Championships. Aruba later received a universality spot in the men's laser event. After the close of entries, Aruba was awarded an additional universality spot in the women's laser radial event. Therefore, in total Aruba qualified three sailors (two men and one woman).

Key

- **DNS**= Did not start

Athlete	Event	Race													Net Points	Final Rank
Athlete	Event	1	2	3	4	5	6	7	8	9	10	11	12	M	Net Points	Final Rank
**Mack van den Eerenbeemt**	Men's RS:X	4	6	5	7	3	6	5	5	2	2	3	2	2	45	3rd place, bronze medalist(s)
Tijn van der Gulik	Men's laser	5	18	10	9	20	20	18	17	DNS	20	—N/a		Did not qualify	137	16
Philipine van Aanholt	Women's laser radial	9	14	2	8	10	6	9	10	13	10	—N/a		12	89	9

== Shooting ==
Aruba qualified one female sport pistol shooter. However, as part of the qualification system, countries are able to switch quotas among events (within the same discipline). Therefore Aruba entered a male competitor.

Men

Athlete	Event	Qualification		Final	
Athlete	Event	Points	Rank	Points	Rank
Philip Elhage	10 metre air pistol	564	15	did not advance	

== Swimming ==
Aruba qualified three swimmers (two men and one woman).

Key

- Note – Ranks given are for the entire round
- **NR** – National record
- **QA** – Qualified for the A final
- **QB** – Qualified for the B final

Athlete	Event	Heat		Final	
Athlete	Event	Time	Rank	Time	Rank
Patrick Groters	Men's 100 m backstroke	56.20 **NR**	9 **QB**	55.82 **NR**	10
Patrick Groters	Men's 200 m backstroke	2:02.32 **NR**	8 **QA**	2:03.65	8
Patrick Groters	Men's 200 m individual medley	2:03.33 **NR**	=6 **QA**	2:06.21	8
Mikel Schreuders	Men's 50 m freestyle	23.06	=14 **QB**	22.89	11
Mikel Schreuders	Men's 100 m freestyle	49.08 **NR**	3 **QA**	49.21	6
Mikel Schreuders	Men's 200 m freestyle	1:49.48	6 **QA**	1:49.92	7
Allyson Ponson	Women's 50 m freestyle	25.90	9 **QB**	26.19	11
Allyson Ponson	Women's 100 m freestyle	57.28	9 **QB**	57.06	9

== Taekwondo ==
Aruba received one wildcard in the men's +80 kg event.

Kyorugi
Men

Athlete	Event	Round of 16	Quarterfinals	Semifinals	Repechage	Final / BM	Rank
Athlete	Event	Opposition Result	Opposition Result	Opposition Result	Opposition Result	Opposition Result	Rank
Stuart Smit	+80 kg	Andrade (BRA); **L** 6–19	did not advance				

== See also ==
- Aruba at the 2019 Parapan American Games
