= Aruba at the 2023 World Aquatics Championships =

- Flag of Aruba
- World Aquatics code: ARU
- National federation: Aruba Aquatics Federation
- Website: arubaswimming.com

in Fukuoka, Japan
- Competitors: 7 in 3 sports
- Medals: Gold 0 Silver 0 Bronze 0 Total 0

World Aquatics Championships appearances
- 1973; 1975; 1978; 1982; 1986; 1991; 1994; 1998; 2001; 2003; 2005; 2007; 2009; 2011; 2013; 2015; 2017; 2019; 2022; 2023; 2024; 2025

Aruba is set to compete at the 2023 World Aquatics Championships in Fukuoka, Japan from 14 to 30 July.

== Artistic swimming ==
Aruba entered 2 artistic swimmers.

Women

Athlete	Event	Preliminaries		Final	
Athlete	Event	Points	Rank	Points	Rank
Kyra Hoevertsz	Solo technical routine	193.9400	11 Q	212.1967	7
Kyra Hoevertsz	Solo free routine	153.2980	11 Q	136.4083	12
Kyra Hoevertsz; Mikayla Morales	Duet technical routine	165.2667	31	did not advance	
Kyra Hoevertsz; Mikayla Morales	Duet free routine	138.4396	23	did not advance	

== Open water swimming ==
Aruba entered 1 open water swimmer.

Women

Athlete	Event	Time	Rank
Britta Schwengle	Women's 5 km	1:06:49.5	47
Britta Schwengle	Women's 10 km	2:19:11.9	49

== Swimming ==
Aruba entered 4 swimmers.

Men

Athlete	Event	Heat		Semifinal		Final	
Athlete	Event	Time	Rank	Time	Rank	Time	Rank
Bransly Dirksz	100 metre breaststroke	1:05.38	59	Did not advance			
Bransly Dirksz	200 metre breaststroke	2:28.73	43	Did not advance			
Mikel Schreuders	50 metre freestyle	22.10	17	Did not advance			
Mikel Schreuders	100 metre freestyle	48.64	22	Did not advance			
Mikel Schreuders	50 metre breaststroke	27.47	18	Did not advance			
Mikel Schreuders	50 metre butterfly	23.65 NR	27	Did not advance			

Women

Athlete	Event	Heat		Semifinal		Final	
Athlete	Event	Time	Rank	Time	Rank	Time	Rank
Chloe Farro	200 metre freestyle	2:13.48	58	Did not advance			
Chloe Farro	50 metre butterfly	29.41	47	Did not advance			
Elisabeth Timmer	50 metre freestyle	27.01	55	Did not advance			
Elisabeth Timmer	100 metre freestyle	57.86	34	Did not advance			

Mixed

Athlete	Event	Heat		Final	
Athlete	Event	Time	Rank	Time	Rank
Mikel Schreuders; Bransly Dirksz; Elisabeth Timmer; Chloe Farro	4 × 100 m freestyle relay	3:37.89	23	Did not advance	
