= Aruba at the 2015 World Aquatics Championships =

- Flag of Aruba
- World Aquatics code: ARU
- National federation: Aruban Swimming Federation
- Website: www.arubaswimming.com

in Kazan, Russia
- Competitors: 6 in 2 sports
- Medals: Gold 0 Silver 0 Bronze 0 Total 0

World Aquatics Championships appearances
- 1973; 1975; 1978; 1982; 1986; 1991; 1994; 1998; 2001; 2003; 2005; 2007; 2009; 2011; 2013; 2015; 2017; 2019; 2022; 2023; 2024; 2025

Aruba competed at the 2015 World Aquatics Championships in Kazan, Russia from 24 July to 9 August 2015.

== Swimming ==
Aruban swimmers have achieved qualifying standards in the following events (up to a maximum of 2 swimmers in each event at the A-standard entry time, and 1 at the B-standard):

Men

Athlete	Event	Heat		Semifinal		Final	
Athlete	Event	Time	Rank	Time	Rank	Time	Rank
Jordy Groters	50 m breaststroke	28.64	41	did not advance			
Jordy Groters	100 m breaststroke	1:03.66	51	did not advance			
Mikel Schreuters	50 m freestyle	23.89	=54	did not advance			
Mikel Schreuters	100 m freestyle	51.77	68	did not advance			

Women

Athlete	Event	Heat		Semifinal		Final	
Athlete	Event	Time	Rank	Time	Rank	Time	Rank
Allyson Ponson	50 m freestyle	26.40	51	did not advance			
Allyson Ponson	100 m freestyle	58.76	=59	did not advance			
Daniella van den Berg	400 m freestyle	4:24.79	38	—N/a		did not advance	
Daniella van den Berg	800 m freestyle	9:03.71	35	—N/a		did not advance	

== Synchronized swimming ==
Aruba has qualified two synchronized swimmers to compete in each of the following events.

Women

Athlete	Event	Preliminaries		Final	
Athlete	Event	Points	Rank	Points	Rank
Anouk Eman; Kyra Hoevertsz	Duet technical routine	71.2453	30	did not advance	
Anouk Eman; Kyra Hoevertsz	Duet free routine	74.8000	27	did not advance	
