= Netherlands Antilles at the 2007 Pan American Games =

- IOC code: AHO
- NOC: Netherlands Antilles Olympic Committee

in Rio de Janeiro 13–29 July 2007
- Competitors: 45 in 7 sports
- Flag bearer: Rodion Davelaar
- Medals Ranked 19th: Gold 1 Silver 0 Bronze 1 Total 2

Pan American Games appearances (overview)
- 1959; 1963; 1967; 1971; 1975; 1979; 1983; 1987; 1991; 1995; 1999; 2003; 2007; 2011

Other related appearances
- Aruba (1959–pres.)

The 15th Pan American Games were held in Rio de Janeiro, Brazil, between 13 July 2007 and 29 July 2007. The Netherlands Antilles delegation had 43 athletes, 23 men and 20 women, competing in 7 sports.

== Medals ==
=== Gold ===
===== Athletics =====
- Men's 100 metres: Churandy Martina

=== Bronze ===
===== Field Hockey =====
- Women's Team Competition: Netherlands Antilles women's national field hockey team

== See also ==
- Netherlands Antilles at the 2008 Summer Olympics
