= Aruba at the 2024 World Aquatics Championships =

- Flag of Aruba
- World Aquatics code: ARU
- National federation: Aruba Aquatics Federation
- Website: arubaswimming.com

in Doha, Qatar
- Competitors: 5 in 3 sports
- Medals: Gold 0 Silver 0 Bronze 0 Total 0

World Aquatics Championships appearances
- 1973; 1975; 1978; 1982; 1986; 1991; 1994; 1998; 2001; 2003; 2005; 2007; 2009; 2011; 2013; 2015; 2017; 2019; 2022; 2023; 2024; 2025

Aruba competed at the 2024 World Aquatics Championships in Doha, Qatar from 2 to 18 February.

== Competitors ==
The following is the list of competitors in the Championships.

Sport	Men	Women	Total
Artistic swimming	0	2	2
Open water swimming	0	1	1
Swimming	2	0	2
Total	2	3	5

== Artistic swimming ==
Women

Athlete	Event	Preliminaries		Final	
Athlete	Event	Points	Rank	Points	Rank
Kyra Hoevertsz	Solo technical routine	221.3450	11 Q	227.1683	7
Kyra Hoevertsz	Solo free routine	197.7791	13	did not advance	
Kyra Hoevertsz; Mikayla Morales	Duet technical routine	216.7183	15	did not advance	
Kyra Hoevertsz; Mikayla Morales	Duet free routine	196.3771	11 Q	199.0876	11

== Open water swimming ==
Women

Athlete	Event	Time	Rank
Britta Schwengle	Women's 10 km	2:13:36.9	54

== Swimming ==
Aruba entered 2 swimmers.

Men

Athlete	Event	Heat		Semifinal		Final	
Athlete	Event	Time	Rank	Time	Rank	Time	Rank
Patrick Groters	200 metre backstroke	2:06.10	28	Did not advance			
Patrick Groters	200 metre individual medley	2:05.59	33	Did not advance			
Mikel Schreuders	50 metre freestyle	22.22	22	Did not advance			
Mikel Schreuders	100 metre freestyle	48.59	8 Q	48.46	12	Did not advance	
Mikel Schreuders	50 metre breaststroke	27.18	11 Q	27.05	8 Q	26.97	7
