= Aruba at the 2011 Pan American Games =

- IOC code: ARU
- NOC: Aruban Olympic Committee
- Website: www.olympicaruba.com

in Guadalajara 14–30 October 2011
- Competitors: 17 in 5 sports
- Flag bearer: Stuart Smit
- Medals: Gold 0 Silver 0 Bronze 0 Total 0

Pan American Games appearances (overview)
- 1987; 1991; 1995; 1999; 2003; 2007; 2011; 2015; 2019; 2023

Other related appearances
- Netherlands Antilles (1987–pres.)

Aruba competed at the 2011 Pan American Games in Guadalajara, Mexico from October 14 to 30, 2011. Aruba competed with seventeen athletes in five sports.

== Bowling ==
Aruba had qualified a women's team of 2 athletes.

Women

Individual

Athlete	Event	Qualification															Eighth Finals	Quarterfinals	Semifinals	Finals	
Athlete	Event	Block 1 (Games 1–6)						Block 2 (Games 7–12)						Total	Average	Rank	Eighth Finals	Quarterfinals	Semifinals	Finals	
Athlete	Event	1	2	3	4	5	6	7	8	9	10	11	12	Total	Average	Rank	Opposition Scores	Opposition Scores	Opposition Scores	Opposition Scores	Rank
Kamilah Dammers	Women's individual	225	222	203	211	176	225	232	140	157	199	172	198	2360	196.7	9	Marcano (COL); L 613–645	Did not advance			
Thashaïna Seraus	Women's individual	166	202	178	211	211	230	169	224	186	182	186	201	2346	195.5	10	Park (CAN); L 591–621	Did not advance			

Pairs

Athlete	Event	Block 1 (Games 1–6)								Block 2 (Games 7–12)								Grand total	Final Rank
Athlete	Event	1	2	3	4	5	6	Total	Average	7	8	9	10	11	12	Total	Average	Grand total	Final Rank
Thashaïna Seraus; Kamilah Dammers	Women's pairs	155	165	184	178	216	221	1119	186.5	202	194	173	146	195	242	2271	189.3	4446	9th
Thashaïna Seraus; Kamilah Dammers	Women's pairs	168	168	168	201	142	147	994	165.7	197	247	185	171	175	206	2175	181.3	4446	9th

== Cycling ==
=== BMX ===
Aruba had qualified one male BMX cyclist.

Men

Athlete	Qualification								Semifinals		Final	
Athlete	Race 1		Race 2		Race 3		Total Points	Qual. Rank	Time	Rank	Time	Rank
Athlete	Time	Points	Time	Points	Time	Points	Total Points	Qual. Rank	Time	Rank	Time	Rank
Bryan Elisabeth	57.487	7	DNF	7	41.417	7	21	19th	Did not advance			

== Swimming ==
Aruba had qualified three swimmers.

Men

Athlete	Event	Heats		Final	
Athlete	Event	Time	Rank	Time	Rank
Jordy Groters	200 m breaststroke	2:26.69	13th	Did not advance	

Women

Athlete	Event	Heats		Final	
Athlete	Event	Time	Rank	Time	Rank
Allyson Ponson	50 m freestyle	27.16	15th	Did not advance	
Allyson Ponson	100 m freestyle	59.59	15th	Did not advance	
Daniella van den Berg	200 m medley	2:32.43	19th	Did not advance	
Daniella van den Berg	400 m medley	5:24.75	19th	Did not advance	

== Synchronized swimming ==
Aruba had qualified a full team (a duet and a team). 9 athletes.

Athlete	Event	Technical Routine		Free Routine (Final)			
Athlete	Event	Points	Rank	Points	Rank	Total Points	Rank
Anouk Eman; Nikita Pablo	Women's duet	73.250	8th	73.125	8th	146.375	8th
Anouk Eman; Nikita Pablo; Amanda Maduro; Nathania Taylor; Jitva Sarman; Nathifa Sarman; Nakaylee Didder; Alexandra Mendoza; Neftaly Albertsz	Women's team	70.625	7th	71.525	7th	142.150	7th

== Taekwondo ==
Aruba had qualified a team of 2 male taekwondo athletes.

Men

Athlete	Event	Round of 16	Quarterfinals	Semifinals	Final
Athlete	Event	Opposition Result	Opposition Result	Opposition Result	Opposition Result
Nigel Ras	Flyweight (-58kg)	Frank Díaz (CUB); L 5 - 7	Did not advance		
Stuart Smit	Middleweight (-80kg)	ahmar Jean-Marie (ISV); W 15 - 3	Stuardo Solorzano (GUA); L 4 - 4 (SUP)	Did not advance	
