= 2016 FINA World Swimming Championships (25 m) – Women's 800 metre freestyle =

Women's 800 metre freestyle at the 2016 FINA World Swimming Championships (25 m)
- Venue: WFCU Centre
- Dates: 7 December (heats); 8 December (final)
- Competitors: 32 from 27 nations
- Winning time: 8:10.17

Medalists
gold medal	Leah Smith	United States
silver medal	Ashley Twichell	United States
bronze medal	Kiah Melverton	Australia

The Women's 800 metre freestyle competition of the 2016 FINA World Swimming Championships (25 m) was held on 7 and 8 December 2016.

== Records ==
Prior to the competition, the existing world and championship records were as follows.

	Name	Nation	Time	Location	Date
World record	Mireia Belmonte	Spain	7:59.34	Berlin	10 August 2013
Championship record	Mireia Belmonte	Spain	8:03.41	Doha	4 December 2014

== Results ==
=== Heats ===
The heats were held at 11:31.

Rank	Heat	Lane	Name	Nationality	Time	Notes
1	4	4	Leah Smith	United States	8:07.67	Q, AM
2	3	4	Ashley Twichell	United States	8:16.08	Q
3	3	3	Kiah Melverton	Australia	8:23.51	Q
4	4	2	Olivia Anderson	Canada	8:24.65	Q
5	4	5	Katinka Hosszú	Hungary	8:25.00	Q
6	2	4	Delfina Pignatiello	Argentina	8:25.05	Q, NR
7	3	2	Zhang Yuhan	China	8:25.33	Q
8	4	8	Ariarne Titmus	Australia	8:25.85	Q
9	4	3	Sharon van Rouwendaal	Netherlands	8:27.41	
10	4	7	Celine Rieder	Germany	8:28.50	
11	4	6	Viviane Jungblut	Brazil	8:29.58	
12	3	1	Hannah Miley	Great Britain	8:30.96	
13	3	8	Yuna Kikuchi	Japan	8:33.06	
14	3	7	Gaja Natlacen	Slovenia	8:34.59	
15	4	0	Martina Elhenická	Czech Republic	8:34.60	
16	3	6	Dong Jie	China	8:35.69	
17	3	9	Diana Durães	Portugal	8:36.08	
18	4	1	Misato Iwanaga	Japan	8:38.61	
19	4	9	Julia Hassler	Liechtenstein	8:39.95	
20	3	0	Tamila Holub	Portugal	8:41.46	
21	2	6	Helena Moreno	Costa Rica	8:44.01	NR
22	2	7	Souad Nefissa Cherouati	Algeria	8:45.40	NR
23	2	5	Monique Olivier	Luxembourg	8:45.47	
24	2	3	Benjaporn Sriphanomthorn	Thailand	8:54.90	NR
25	2	8	Nejla Karić	Bosnia and Herzegovina	8:57.87	NR
26	2	1	Daniella van den Berg	Aruba	8:58.72	NR
27	2	2	Daniela Miyahara Coello	Peru	8:59.57	
28	1	4	Rosalee Mira Santa Ana	Philippines	9:02.19	NR
29	1	5	Gabriella Doueihy	Lebanon	9:03.93	NR
30	2	9	Malavika Vishwanath	India	9:12.08	
31	1	3	Fatima Alkaramova	Azerbaijan	9:25.50	NR
32	1	6	Osisang Chilton	Palau	10:15.29	NR
	2	0	Talita Te Flan	Ivory Coast		DNS
	3	5	Mireia Belmonte	Spain		DNS

=== Final ===
The final was held at 20:06.

Rank	Lane	Name	Nationality	Time	Notes
1st place, gold medalist(s)	4	Leah Smith	United States	8:10.17	
2nd place, silver medalist(s)	5	Ashley Twichell	United States	8:11.95	
3rd place, bronze medalist(s)	3	Kiah Melverton	Australia	8:16.51	
4	8	Ariarne Titmus	Australia	8:17.95	
5	1	Zhang Yuhan	China	8:21.05	
6	7	Delfina Pignatiello	Argentina	8:26.41	
7	6	Olivia Anderson	Canada	8:30.16	
8	2	Katinka Hosszú	Hungary	8:36.76	
