= Aruba at the 2011 World Aquatics Championships =

- Flag of Aruba
- FINA code: ARU
- National federation: Aruban Swimming Federation
- Website: www.arubaswimming.com

in Shanghai, China
- Competitors: 3 in 1 sport
- Medals: Gold 0 Silver 0 Bronze 0 Total 0

World Aquatics Championships appearances
- 1973; 1975; 1978; 1982; 1986; 1991; 1994; 1998; 2001; 2003; 2005; 2007; 2009; 2011; 2013; 2015; 2017; 2019; 2022; 2023; 2024

Aruba competed at the 2011 World Aquatics Championships in Shanghai, China between July 16 and 31, 2011.

== Swimming ==
Aruba qualified 3 swimmers.

Men

Athlete	Event	Heats		Semifinals		Final	
Athlete	Event	Time	Rank	Time	Rank	Time	Rank
Jemal Le Grand	Men's 100m Freestyle	52.62	58	did not advance			
Jemal Le Grand	Men's 200m Freestyle	1:58.24	54	did not advance			
Jordy Groters	Men's 100m Breaststroke	1:06.88	70	did not advance			
Jordy Groters	Men's 200m Breaststroke	2:24.60	49	did not advance			

Women

Athlete	Event	Heats		Semifinals		Final	
Athlete	Event	Time	Rank	Time	Rank	Time	Rank
Daniella van den Berg	Women's 200m IM	2:30.02	36	did not advance			
Daniella van den Berg	Women's 400m IM	5:18.27	35			did not advance	
