= Aruba at the 2023 Pan American Games =

- IOC code: ARU
- NOC: Aruban Olympic Committee

in Santiago, Chile 20 October 2023 – 5 November 2023
- Competitors: 14 in 6 sports
- Flag bearers (opening): Mikel Schreuders & Shanayah Howell
- Flag bearer (closing): TBD
- Medals Ranked 23rd: Gold 0 Silver 2 Bronze 1 Total 3

Pan American Games appearances (overview)
- 1987; 1991; 1995; 1999; 2003; 2007; 2011; 2015; 2019; 2023

Other related appearances
- Netherlands Antilles (1987–pres.)

Aruba competed at the 2023 Pan American Games in Santiago, Chile from October 20 to November 5, 2023. This was Aruba's 10th appearance at the Pan American Games, having competed at every edition of the Games since 1987.

The Aruban delegation consisted of 14 athletes. Swimmer Mikel Schreuders and BMX cyclist Shanayah Howell were the country's flagbearers during the opening ceremony.

== Medalists ==
The following Aruban competitors won medals at the games. In the by discipline sections below, medalists' names are bolded.

Medal	Name	Sport	Event	Date
Silver	Ethan Westera	Sailing	Men's IQFoil	November 3
Silver	Philipine van Aanholt	Sailing	Women's sunfish	November 4
Bronze	Rob Timmermmans	Karate	Men's +84 kg	November 4

== Competitors ==
The following is the list of number of competitors (per gender) participating at the games per sport/discipline.

Sport	Men	Women	Total
Artistic swimming	0	2	2
Bowling	0	2	2
Cycling	0	1	1
Karate	1	0	1
Sailing	2	1	3
Shooting	1	0	1
Swimming	2	2	4
Total	6	8	14

== Artistic swimming ==
Aruba qualified a team of two artistic swimmers after the 2022 Central American and Caribbean Games.

Athlete	Event	Technical Routine		Free Routine (Final)			
Athlete	Event	Points	Rank	Points	Rank	Total Points	Rank
Kyra Hoevertsz; Mikayla Morales	Women's duet	Did not start					

== Bowling ==
Aruba qualified a team of two women through the 2022 South American Games held in Asunción, Paraguay.

Athlete	Event	Ranking round		Semifinal	Final	
Athlete	Event	Score	Rank	Opposition Result	Opposition Result	Rank
Kamilah Dammers	Women's singles	3251	5	Did not advance		
Abigail Dammers	Women's singles	2862	24	Did not advance		
Kamilah Dammers; Abigail Dammers	Women's doubles	2732	11	—N/a		

== Cycling ==
Aruba qualified a total of 2 cyclists (2 women).

=== BMX ===
Aruba qualified one cyclist in BMX race through the UCI World Ranking of Nations.

Racing

Athlete	Event	Ranking round		Quarterfinal		Semifinal		Final	
Athlete	Event	Time	Rank	Points	Rank	Time	Rank	Time	Rank
Shanayah Howell	Women's	37.900	11	11	4 **Q**	15	5	Did not advance	

== Karate ==
Aruba qualified a male karateka at the 2023 Pan American Championships.

Kumite

Athlete	Event	Round robin				Semifinal	Final	
Athlete	Event	Opposition Result	Opposition Result	Opposition Result	Rank	Opposition Result	Opposition Result	Rank
**Rob Timmermans**	Men's +84 kg	Salgado (BRA); **W** 2–1	Lenis (COL); **W** 2–0	Oporta (NCA); **W** 3–1	—N/a	Miranda (BRA); **L** 1–7	Did not advance	3rd place, bronze medalist(s)

== Sailing ==
Aruba qualified 3 boats for a total of 3 sailors.

Men

Athlete	Event	Opening series																		Finals				
Athlete	Event	1	2	3	4	5	6	7	8	9	10	11	12	13	14	15	16	Points	Rank	QF	SF	M / F	Points	Rank
**Ethan Westera**	IQFoil	2	1	1	1	~~5~~	1	2	1	1	3	1	2	~~11~~; ~~UFD~~	1	4	4	21	1 **Q**	Bye		2	—N/a	2nd place, silver medalist(s)
Just van Aanholt	Laser	9	2	12	~~15~~	15	6	12	3	1	7	—N/a						67	7	—N/a		Did not advance		

Women

Athlete	Event	Opening series																		Finals				
Athlete	Event	1	2	3	4	5	6	7	8	9	10	11	12	13	14	15	16	Points	Rank	QF	SF	M / F	Points	Rank
**Philipine van Aanholt**	Sunfish	~~3~~	3	2	2	2	3	3	3	3	2	—N/a						29	2 **Q**	—N/a		6	32	2nd place, silver medalist(s)

== Shooting ==
Aruba qualified one shooter.

Men

Athlete	Event	Qualification		Final	
Athlete	Event	Points	Rank	Points	Rank
Philip Elhage	10 m air pistol	561	20	Did not advance	

== Swimming ==
Aruba qualified a total of three swimmers in the pool events plus one swimmer for the open water event.

Key

- Note – Ranks given are for the entire round
- **NR** – National record
- **Q** – Qualified to the medal final
- **q** – Qualified to the non-medal final

Men

Athlete	Event	Heat		Final	
Athlete	Event	Time	Rank	Time	Rank
Mikel Schreuders	50 m freestyle	22.69	11 **q**	22.58	10
Mikel Schreuders	100 m freestyle	49.88	13 **q**	49.69	10
Mikel Schreuders	100 metre butterfly	55.92	19	Did not advance	
Patrick Groters	100 m backstroke	56.36	12 **q**	55.96	9
Patrick Groters	200 m backstroke	2:04.50	9 **q**	2:02.83	9
Patrick Groters	200 metre individual medley	2:03.76	11 **q**	2:06.69	16

Women

Athlete	Event	Heat		Final	
Athlete	Event	Time	Rank	Time	Rank
Elisabeth Timmer	50 m freestyle	26.38	19	Did not advance	
Elisabeth Timmer	100 m freestyle	57.86	18	Did not advance	
Elisabeth Timmer	200 m freestyle	2:08.59	19	Did not advance	
Britta Schwengle	10 km open water	—N/a		2:07:28.0	16

== Non-competing sports ==
=== Weightlifting ===
Aruba qualified one female weightlifter though it did not compete.

== See also ==
- Aruba at the 2023 Parapan American Games
- Aruba at the 2024 Summer Olympics
