= Aruba at the 2013 World Aquatics Championships =

- Flag of Aruba
- World Aquatics code: ARU
- National federation: Aruban Swimming Federation
- Website: www.arubaswimming.com

in Barcelona, Spain
- Medals: Gold 0 Silver 0 Bronze 0 Total 0

World Aquatics Championships appearances
- 1973; 1975; 1978; 1982; 1986; 1991; 1994; 1998; 2001; 2003; 2005; 2007; 2009; 2011; 2013; 2015; 2017; 2019; 2022; 2023; 2024; 2025

Aruba is competing at the 2013 World Aquatics Championships in Barcelona, Spain from 19 July to 4 August 2013.

== Swimming ==
Aruba qualified 5 quota places for the following diving events:

Men

Athlete	Event	Heat		Semifinal		Final	
Athlete	Event	Time	Rank	Time	Rank	Time	Rank
Jemal Le Grand	100 m freestyle	52.07	49	did not advance			
Jemal Le Grand	200 m freestyle	1:55.08	52	did not advance			

Women

Athlete	Event	Heat		Semifinal		Final	
Athlete	Event	Time	Rank	Time	Rank	Time	Rank
Allyson Ponson	50 m freestyle	26.27	38	did not advance			
Allyson Ponson	100 m freestyle	58.61	53	did not advance			
Gabrielle Ponson	200 m freestyle	2:13.01	40	did not advance			

== Synchronized swimming ==
Aruba qualified 3 quota places for the following synchronized swimming events.

Athlete	Event	Preliminaries		Final	
Athlete	Event	Points	Rank	Points	Rank
Anouk Eman	Solo technical routine	71.500	26	did not advance	
Anouk Eman; Kyra Hoevertsz	Duet technical routine	69.600	27	did not advance	
Anouk Eman; Kyra Hoevertsz	Duet free routine	72.260	24	did not advance	
