= Aruba at the 2007 Pan American Games =

- IOC code: ARU
- NOC: Aruban Olympic Committee
- Website: www.olympicaruba.com

in Rio de Janeiro 13–29 July 2007
- Competitors: 14
- Flag bearer: Charlene De Cuba
- Medals Ranked 33rd: Gold 0 Silver 0 Bronze 0 Total 0

Pan American Games appearances (overview)
- 1987; 1991; 1995; 1999; 2003; 2007; 2011; 2015; 2019; 2023; 2027

Other related appearances
- Netherlands Antilles (1987–pres.)

The 15th Pan American Games were held in Rio de Janeiro, Brazil from 13 to 29 July 2007.

== See also ==
- Aruba at the 2008 Summer Olympics
