= Netherlands Antilles at the 2011 Pan American Games =

- IOC code: AHO (PASO used at these Games)
- NOC: Netherlands Antilles Olympic Committee

in Guadalajara 14–30 October 2011
- Competitors: 11 in 6 sports
- Flag bearer: Perry Lindo
- Medals Ranked 17th: Gold 1 Silver 0 Bronze 1 Total 2

Pan American Games appearances (overview)
- 1959; 1963; 1967; 1971; 1975; 1979; 1983; 1987; 1991; 1995; 1999; 2003; 2007; 2011

Other related appearances
- Aruba (1959–pres.)

Athletes from the former Netherlands Antilles competed at the 2011 Pan American Games in Guadalajara, Mexico from October 14 to 30, 2011, about one year after the dissolution of the country. Hubert Isenia was the Chef de mission of the team. The team consisted of eleven athletes in six sports.

== Medalists ==
Medal	Name	Sport	Event	Date
Gold	Marc de Maar	Cycling	Men's individual road race	October 22
Bronze	Marisca Verspaget	Karate	Women's 61 kg	October 29

== Cycling ==
=== Road ===
Athletes from the Netherlands Antilles qualified one male cyclist in road cycling.

Men

Athlete	Event	Time	Rank
Wilfried Camellia	Men's road race	DNF	
Marc De Maar	Men's road race	3:40.53	1st place, gold medalist(s)

== Karate ==
Athletes from the Netherlands Antilles qualified one athlete in the 61 kg women's category.

Athlete	Event	Round Robin (Pool A/B)			Semifinals	Final
Athlete	Event	Match 1	Match 2	Match 3	Semifinals	Final
Athlete	Event	Opposition Result	Opposition Result	Opposition Result	Opposition Result	Opposition Result
Mariska Verspaget	–61 kg	Maria Acevedo (ARG); W PTS 5:1	Bertha Gutierrez (MEX); L PTS 0:3	Ana Montilla (DOM); W PTS 2:1	Alexandra Grande (PER); L PTS 0:2 (bronze)	did not advance

== Sailing ==
Athletes from the Netherlands Antilles qualified three boats and three athletes in the sailing competition.

Women

Athlete	Event	Race											Net Points	Final Rank
Athlete	Event	1	2	3	4	5	6	7	8	9	10	M	Net Points	Final Rank
Monique Meyer	Sailboard	~~7~~	7	7	7	7	7	6	7	7	7		62	7th
Philipine van Aanholt	Laser Radial class	11	8	~~DSQ~~	6	4	2	10	7	8	5	2	63	5th

Open

Athlete	Event	Race											Net Points	Final Rank
Athlete	Event	1	2	3	4	5	6	7	8	9	10	M	Net Points	Final Rank
Ard Van Aanholt	Sunfish	7	8	5	~~12~~	2	12	10	2	10	6		62	8th

== Shooting ==
Athletes from the Netherlands Antilles qualified two shooters.

Men

Athlete	Event	Qualification		Final	
Athlete	Event	Score	Rank	Score	Rank
Philip El Hage	10 m air pistol	559	22	did not advance	
Michel Daou	Trap	109	21	did not advance	
Michel Daou	Double trap	116	16	did not advance	

== Swimming ==
Athletes from the Netherlands Antilles qualified two swimmers.

Men

Athlete	Event	Heats		Final	
Athlete	Event	Time	Rank	Time	Rank
Perry Lindo	50 m freestyle	23.60	14 qB	23.65	7th B (15)
Perry Lindo	100 m freestyle	53.32	21	did not advance	
Rodion Davelaar	100 m breaststroke	1:08.07	23	did not advance	

== Taekwondo ==
The Netherlands Antilles received a wildcard to send one male taekwondo athlete.

Men

Athlete	Event	Round of 16	Quarterfinals	Semifinals	Final	
Athlete	Event	Opposition Result	Opposition Result	Opposition Result	Opposition Result	Rank
Audy Muller	−58 kg	Villa (MEX); L 3–15	did not advance			
