= Netherlands Antilles at the 1999 Pan American Games =

- IOC code: AHO
- NOC: Netherlands Antilles Olympic Committee

in Winnipeg 23 July – 8 August 1999
- Medals Ranked 18th: Gold 1 Silver 0 Bronze 0 Total 1

Pan American Games appearances (overview)
- 1959; 1963; 1967; 1971; 1975; 1979; 1983; 1987; 1991; 1995; 1999; 2003; 2007; 2011

Other related appearances
- Aruba (1959–pres.)

The Netherlands Antilles competed at the 13th Pan American Games, which were held in Winnipeg, Manitoba, Canada from July 23 to August 8, 1999.

== Medals ==
=== Gold ===
===== Karate =====
- Men's Kumite (– 70 kg): Anthony Boelbaai

== See also ==
- Netherlands Antilles at the 2000 Summer Olympics
