= Netherlands Antilles at the 2003 Pan American Games =

- IOC code: AHO
- NOC: Netherlands Antilles Olympic Committee

in Santo Domingo 1–17 August 2003
- Flag bearer: Churandy Martina
- Medals Ranked 28th: Gold 0 Silver 0 Bronze 1 Total 1

Pan American Games appearances (overview)
- 1959; 1963; 1967; 1971; 1975; 1979; 1983; 1987; 1991; 1995; 1999; 2003; 2007; 2011

Other related appearances
- Aruba (1959–pres.)

The 14th Pan American Games were held in Santo Domingo, Dominican Republic from August 1 to August 17, 2003.

== Medals ==
=== Bronze ===
===== Karate =====
- Men's Kumite (– 80 kg): Ricardinho Pietersz

== Results by event ==
=== Swimming ===
==== Men's Competition ====
Athlete	Event	Heat		Final	
Athlete	Event	Time	Rank	Time	Rank
Howard Hinds	50 m freestyle	23.70	14	24.04	16
Howard Hinds	100 m freestyle	52.45	21	did not advance	
Vincent van Rutten	200 m freestyle	1:58.84	23	did not advance	

== See also ==
- Netherlands Antilles at the 2004 Summer Olympics
