= Aruba at the 2019 World Aquatics Championships =

- Flag of Aruba
- World Aquatics code: ARU
- National federation: Aruban Swimming Federation
- Website: www.arubaswimming.com

in Gwangju, South Korea
- Competitors: 6 in 2 sports
- Medals: Gold 0 Silver 0 Bronze 0 Total 0

World Aquatics Championships appearances
- 1973; 1975; 1978; 1982; 1986; 1991; 1994; 1998; 2001; 2003; 2005; 2007; 2009; 2011; 2013; 2015; 2017; 2019; 2022; 2023; 2024; 2025

Aruba competed at the 2019 World Aquatics Championships in Gwangju, South Korea from 12 to 28 July.

== Artistic swimming ==
Aruba's artistic swimming team consisted of 2 athletes (2 female).

Women

Athlete	Event	Preliminaries		Final	
Athlete	Event	Points	Rank	Points	Rank
Kyra Hoevertsz	Solo technical routine	73.4699	20	did not advance	
Kyra Hoevertsz	Solo free routine	74.6667	24	did not advance	
Abigail de Veer; Kyra Hoevertsz	Duet technical routine	72.3827	37	did not advance	
Abigail de Veer; Kyra Hoevertsz	Duet free routine	74.1667	37	did not advance	

== Swimming ==
Aruba has entered four swimmers.

Men

Athlete	Event	Heat		Semifinal		Final	
Athlete	Event	Time	Rank	Time	Rank	Time	Rank
Patrick Groters	200 m backstroke	2:10.25	41	did not advance			
Patrick Groters	200 m individual medley	2:11.38	48	did not advance			
Daniel Jacobs	400 m freestyle	4:00.69	40	—N/a		did not advance	
Daniel Jacobs	800 m freestyle	8:22.96	34	—N/a		did not advance	
Mikel Schreuder	100 m freestyle	49.59	35	did not advance			
Mikel Schreuder	200 m freestyle	1:48.92	32	did not advance			

Women

Athlete	Event	Heat		Semifinal		Final	
Athlete	Event	Time	Rank	Time	Rank	Time	Rank
Allyson Ponson	50 m freestyle	26.06	38	did not advance			
Allyson Ponson	100 m freestyle	57.67	46	did not advance			
