= Netherlands Antilles at the 1991 Pan American Games =

Netherlands Antilles at the 1999 Pan American Games
- IOC code: AHO
- NOC: Netherlands Antilles Olympic Committee

in Winnipeg 23 July – 8 August 1999
- Medals Ranked 27th: Gold 0 Silver 0 Bronze 0 Total 0

Pan American Games appearances (overview)
- 1959; 1963; 1967; 1971; 1975; 1979; 1983; 1987; 1991; 1995; 1999; 2003; 2007; 2011

Other related appearances
- Aruba (1959–pres.)

The 11th Pan American Games were held in Havana, Cuba from August 2 to August 18, 1991.

== See also ==
- Netherlands Antilles at the 1992 Summer Olympics
