= Aruba at the 2015 Pan American Games =

- IOC code: ARU
- NOC: Aruban Olympic Committee
- Website: www.olympicaruba.com

in Toronto, Canada 10–26 July 2015
- Competitors: 25 in 9 sports
- Flag bearer (opening): Philipine van Aanholt
- Flag bearer (closing): Thashaina Seraus
- Medals: Gold 0 Silver 0 Bronze 0 Total 0

Pan American Games appearances (overview)
- 1987; 1991; 1995; 1999; 2003; 2007; 2011; 2015; 2019; 2023

Other related appearances
- Netherlands Antilles (1987–pres.)

Aruba competed at the 2015 Pan American Games in Toronto, Ontario, Canada from July 10 to 26, 2015.

A team of 25 athletes across 9 sports were selected to represent the country at the games. Sailor Philipine van Aanholt was the flagbearer of the team during the opening ceremony.

Aruba did not medal at the games, continuing its drought as one of two nations (along with The British Virgin Islands) to never win a Pan American Games medal. However, the nation did come close to ending the drought with one fourth place and two fifth-place finishes.

== Competitors ==
The following table lists Aruba's delegation per sport and gender.

Sport	Men	Women	Total
Athletics	1	0	1
Beach volleyball	2	0	2
Bowling	2	2	4
Cycling	1	0	1
Sailing	0	1	1
Swimming	1	2	3
Synchronized swimming	0	9	9
Taekwondo	1	1	2
Triathlon	1	0	1
Weightlifting	0	1	1
Total	9	16	25

== Athletics ==
Aruba received one wildcard.

Men
Field events

Key

- Note–Ranks given for track events are for the entire round
- q = Qualified for the next round as a fastest loser or, in field events, by position without achieving the qualifying target

Athlete(s)	Event	Qualification		Final	
Athlete(s)	Event	Result	Rank	Result	Rank
Quincy Breell	Long jump	7.60	10 q	7.70	8

== Beach volleyball ==
Aruba qualified a men's pair.

Athlete	Event	Preliminary Round			13th-16th round	15th place match	Finals
Athlete	Event	Opposition Score	Opposition Score	Opposition Score	Opposition Score	Opposition Score	Rank
Mitchel Daniel; Eargenell De Cuba	Men's	Araujo / Filho (BRA); L (10–21, 13–21)	Ontiveros / Virgen (MEX); L (10–21, 9–21)	Henriquez / Villafañe (VEN); L (14–21, 13–21)	Bissette / Clercent (LCA); L (21–18, 18–21, 17–19)	Ocaña / Betancourt (GUA); W (21–18, 21–18)	15

== Bowling ==
Aruba qualified a full team of two male and two female athletes.

Singles

Athlete	Event	Qualification															Eighth Finals	Quarterfinals	Semifinals	Finals	
Athlete	Event	Block 1 (Games 1–6)						Block 2 (Games 7–12)						Total	Average	Rank	Eighth Finals	Quarterfinals	Semifinals	Finals	
Athlete	Event	1	2	3	4	5	6	7	8	9	10	11	12	Total	Average	Rank	Opposition Scores	Opposition Scores	Opposition Scores	Opposition Scores	Rank
Bryan Helmeyer	Men's	200	182	179	172	180	167	223	181	225	191	201	146	2247	187.3	26	did not advance				
Jason Odor	Men's	184	177	198	169	231	200	130	195	166	130	172	180	2132	177.7	28	did not advance				
Kamilah Dammers	Women's	167	167	162	187	168	158	126	186	201	180	187	232	2121	176.8	25	did not advance				
Thashaina Seraus	Women's	210	279	211	203	255	175	187	201	222	239	187	222	2591	215.9	3	1630; 5	did not advance			

Doubles

Athlete	Event	Block 1 (Games 1–6)								Block 2 (Games 7–12)								Grand Total	Final Rank
Athlete	Event	1	2	3	4	5	6	Total	Average	7	8	9	10	11	12	Total	Average	Grand Total	Final Rank
Bryan Helmeyer; Jason Odor	Men's	155	234	237	204	210	211	1251	208.5	168	161	157	176	165	185	1012	168.7	4501	13
Bryan Helmeyer; Jason Odor	Men's	160	188	215	182	157	164	1066	177.7	202	236	192	200	125	217	1172	195.3	4501	13
Kamilah Dammers; Thashaina Seraus	Women's	213	170	171	173	158	216	1101	183.5	231	192	227	186	182	195	1213	202.2	4601	9
Kamilah Dammers; Thashaina Seraus	Women's	123	202	183	175	164	151	998	166.3	222	247	203	195	180	242	1289	214.8	4601	9

== Cycling ==
Aruba received a reallocated spot in the men's BMX category.

=== BMX ===
Key

- Q = Qualified for the next round

Athlete	Event	Seeding		Quarterfinal		Semifinal		Final	
Athlete	Event	Result	Rank	Points	Rank	Points	Rank	Result	Rank
Zaithyel Soekandar	Men's BMX	38.590	14 Q	16	20	did not advance			

== Sailing ==
Aruba qualified one sailor.

Athlete	Event	Race													Net Points	Final Rank
Athlete	Event	1	2	3	4	5	6	7	8	9	10	11	12	M*	Net Points	Final Rank
Philipine van Aanholt	Laser Radial	6	7	2	6	(11)	3	3	7	7	10	5	9	6	71	4

== Swimming ==
Aruba qualified three swimmers.

Key

- Note – Ranks given are for the entire round
- FB = Qualified for the B Final
- FA = Qualified for the A Final
- DNS = Did not start

Athlete	Event	Heat		Final	
Athlete	Event	Time	Rank	Time	Rank
Jordy Groters	Men's 50 m freestyle	23.93	18	did not advance	
Jordy Groters	Men's 100 m freestyle	51.71	15 QB	Withdrew	
Jordy Groters	Men's 100 m breaststroke	1:03.92	15 QB	1:03.97	14
Jordy Groters	Men's 200 m breaststroke	2:20.40	16 QB	2:18.55	16
Jordy Groters	Men's 200 m individual medley	2:11.55	18	did not advance	
Allyson Ponson	Women's 50 m freestyle	26.22	15 QB	26.37	16
Allyson Ponson	Women's 100 m freestyle	57.89	19	did not advance	
Daniella van den Berg	Women's 200 m freestyle	2:08.49	18	did not advance	
Daniella van den Berg	Women's 400 m freestyle	4:28.01	15 QB	4:30.14	16
Daniella van den Berg	Women's 800 m freestyle	—N/a		9:12.30	15
Daniella van den Berg	Women's 200 m butterfly	2:26.04	17	did not advance	

== Synchronized swimming ==
Aruba qualified a full team of nine athletes.

Athlete	Event	Technical Routine		Free Routine (Final)			
Athlete	Event	Points	Rank	Points	Rank	Total Points	Rank
Anouk Eman; Kyra Hoevertsz	Women's duet	74.4087	8	76.4333	7	150.8420	7
Amanda Maduro; Alexandra Mendoza; Kiara Van Trikt; Janelle Flemming; Carondina Leijdekkers; Abigail de Veer; Anouk Eman; Kyra Hoevertsz; Neftaly Albertsz	Women's team	68.4442	6	72.7667	6	141.2109	6

== Taekwondo ==
Aruba qualified a team of two athletes (one man and one woman).

Athlete	Event	Round of 16	Quarterfinals	Semifinals	Repechage	Bronze Medal	Final	
Athlete	Event	Opposition Result	Opposition Result	Opposition Result	Opposition Result	Opposition Result	Opposition Result	Rank
John Maduro	Men's 58kg	Muscat (CAN); W 9–4	Peralta (ECU); W 4–3	Pie (DOM); L 3–4	Bye	Avella (COL); L 3–1	—N/a	5
Monica Pimentel	Women's 49kg	Stambaugh (PUR); L 6–13	did not advance					

== Triathlon ==
Aruba received a wildcard to enter one male triathlete.

Men

Athlete	Event	Swim (1.5 km)	Trans 1	Bike (40 km)	Trans 2	Run (10 km)	Total	Rank
Renze Postma	Individual	18:59	0:24	58:21	0:21	37:38	1:55:45	24

== Weightlifting ==
Aruba qualified one female weightlifter.

Women

Athlete	Event	Snatch		Clean & Jerk		Total	Rank
Athlete	Event	Result	Rank	Result	Rank	Total	Rank
Jennifer Piter	63 kg	77	8	95	8	172	8

== See also ==
- Aruba at the 2015 Parapan American Games
- Aruba at the 2016 Summer Olympics
