= Aruba at the 2003 Pan American Games =

- IOC code: ARU
- NOC: Aruban Olympic Committee
- Website: www.olympicaruba.com

in Santo Domingo 1–17 August 2003
- Flag bearer: Charlotte Heemstadt
- Medals Ranked 33rd: Gold 0 Silver 0 Bronze 0 Total 0

Pan American Games appearances (overview)
- 1987; 1991; 1995; 1999; 2003; 2007; 2011; 2015; 2019; 2023

Other related appearances
- Netherlands Antilles (1987–pres.)

The 14th Pan American Games were held in Santo Domingo, Dominican Republic from August 1 to August 17, 2003.

== Results by event ==
=== Swimming ===
==== Men's Competition ====
Athlete	Event	Heat		Final	
Athlete	Event	Time	Rank	Time	Rank
Davy Bisslik	50m freestyle	24.90	29	did not advance	

== See also ==
- Aruba at the 2002 Central American and Caribbean Games
- Aruba at the 2004 Summer Olympics
