= Aruba at the 2022 World Aquatics Championships =

- Flag of Argentina
- World Aquatics code: ARU
- National federation: Aruba Swimming Federation

in Budapest, Hungary
- Competitors: 5 in 2 sports
- Medals: Gold 0 Silver 0 Bronze 0 Total 0

World Aquatics Championships appearances
- 1973; 1975; 1978; 1982; 1986; 1991; 1994; 1998; 2001; 2003; 2005; 2007; 2009; 2011; 2013; 2015; 2017; 2019; 2022; 2023; 2024; 2025

Aruba competed at the 2022 World Aquatics Championships in Budapest, Hungary from 18 June to 3 July.

== Artistic swimming ==
Women

Athlete	Event	Preliminaries		Final	
Athlete	Event	Points	Rank	Points	Rank
Mariajose Salazar	Solo technical routine	65.6580	25	did not advance	
Mariajose Salazar; Melanie Tromp	Duet technical routine	64.1479	31	did not advance	
Mariajose Salazar; Melanie Tromp	Duet free routine	67.6667	30	did not advance	

== Swimming ==
Athlete	Event	Heat		Semifinal		Final	
Athlete	Event	Time	Rank	Time	Rank	Time	Rank
Patrick Groters	Men's 100 m backstroke	57.37	37	did not advance			
Patrick Groters	Men's 200 m backstroke	2:05.90	28	did not advance			
Patrick Groters	Men's 200 m individual medley	2:04.58	28	did not advance			
Mikel Schreuders	Men's 50 m freestyle	22.44	24	did not advance			
Mikel Schreuders	Men's 100 m freestyle	48.40	11 Q	48.73	15	did not advance	
Mikel Schreuders	Men's 200 m freestyle	1:49.39	33	did not advance			
Mikel Schreuders	Men's 50 m breaststroke	27.64	15 Q	27.52	13	did not advance	
Chloe Farro	Women's 50 m freestyle	26.98	42	did not advance			
Chloe Farro	Women's 100 m freestyle	59.13	37	did not advance			
