= Swimming at the 2023 Pan American Games – Women's marathon 10 kilometres =

Women's marathon 10 kilometres at the 2023 Pan American Games
- Venue: Laguna Los Morros
- Date: October 29, 2023
- Competitors: 20 from 12 nations
- Winning time: 1:57:16.4

Medalists
Gold medal	Ashley Twichell	United States
Silver medal	Ana Marcela Cunha	Brazil
Bronze medal	Viviane Jungblut	Brazil

The women's marathon 10 kilometres competition of the swimming events at the 2023 Pan American Games was held on October 29, 2023, at the Laguna Los Morros in Santiago, Chile.

== Schedule ==
Date	Time	Round
October 29, 2023	9:00	Final

== Results ==
KEY:	GR	Games record	NR	National record	PB	Personal best	SB	Seasonal best

Rank	Name	Nationality	Time	Notes
1st place, gold medalist(s)	Ashley Twichell	United States	1:57:16.4	
2nd place, silver medalist(s)	Ana Marcela Cunha	Brazil	1:57:29.4	
3rd place, bronze medalist(s)	Viviane Jungblut	Brazil	1:57:51.1	
4	Cecilia Biagioli	Argentina	1:58:09.7	
5	Leah Degeorge	United States	1:58:54.7	
6	Emma Finlin	Canada	1:59:56.7	
7	Candela Giordanino	Argentina	2:01:43.3	
8	María Bramont-Arias	Peru	2:02:47.4	
9	Martha Sandoval	Mexico	2:03:46.0	
10	Ana Abad	Ecuador	2:03:46.3	
11	Bailey O'Regan	Canada	2:04:35.8	
12	Mahina Valdivia	Chile	2:04:37.1	
13	Fanny Ccollcca	Peru	2:04:48.1	
14	Paulina Alanis	Mexico	2:04:55.0	
15	María Fernanda Porres	Independent Athletes Team	2:06:03.2	
16	Britta Schwengle	Aruba	2:07:28.0	
17	Jennifer Ramírez	Honduras	2:16:48.1	
—N/a	Kisha Jimenez	Costa Rica	DNF	
—N/a	Fatima Portillo	El Salvador	DSQ	
—N/a	Yanci Vanegas	Independent Athletes Team	DSQ	
