= Swimming at the 2023 Pan American Games – Men's 200 metre individual medley =

Men's 200 metre individual medley at the 2023 Pan American Games
- Venue: Aquatic Centre
- Date: October 25, 2023
- Competitors: 27 from 20 nations

Medalists
Gold medal	Finlay Knox	Canada
Silver medal	Arsenio Bustos	United States
Bronze medal	Leonardo Coelho	Brazil

The men's 200 metre individual medley competition of the swimming events at the 2023 Pan American Games were held on October 25, 2023, at the Aquatic Center in Santiago, Chile.

== Records ==
Prior to this competition, the existing world and Pan American Games records were as follows:

World record	Ryan Lochte (USA)	1:54.00	Shanghai, China	July 28, 2011
Pan American Games record	Henrique Rodrigues (BRA)	1:57.06	Toronto, Canada	July 15, 2015

== Results ==
KEY:	QA	Qualified for A final	QB	Qualified for B final	GR	Games record	NR	National record	PB	Personal best	SB	Seasonal best

=== Heats ===
The first round was held on October 25.

Rank	Heat	Lane	Name	Nationality	Time	Notes
1	3	5	Collyn Gagne	Canada	2:02.18	QA
2	2	5	Mason Laur	United States	2:02.41	QA
3	2	4	Vinicius Lanza	Brazil	2:02.44	QA
4	4	4	Finlay Knox	Canada	2:02.45	QA
5	4	5	Leonardo Coelho	Brazil	2:02.63	QA
6	3	4	Arsenio Bustos	United States	2:02.77	QA
7	4	3	Erick Gordillo	Independent Athletes Team	2:02.93	QA
8	2	6	Joaquín González Piñero	Argentina	2:03.05	QA
9	3	3	Tomas Peribonio	Ecuador	2:03.32	QB
10	4	2	Omar Pinzón	Colombia	2:03.47	QB
11	2	3	Patrick Groters	Aruba	2:03.76	QB
12	3	6	Héctor Ruvalcaba	Mexico	2:04.59	QB
13	4	6	José Ángel Martínez	Mexico	2:04.88	QB
14	3	7	Tyler Christianson	Panama	2:06.25	QB
15	4	7	Juan García	Colombia	2:06.66	QB
16	2	1	Esteban Nuñez del Prado	Bolivia	2:07.39	QB
17	3	1	Maximillian Wilson	Virgin Islands	2:07.75	
18	4	1	Manuel Osorio	Chile	2:08.50	
19	4	8	Winston Rodriguez	Venezuela	2:08.82	
20	3	2	Matheo Mateos	Barbados	2:09.61	
21	2	8	Vicente Villanueva	Chile	2:10.00	
22	3	8	Sam Williamson	Bermuda	2:10.51	
23	1	3	Zackary Gresham	Grenada	2:12.50	
24	1	5	Emmanuel Gadson	Bahamas	2:12.56	
25	1	4	José Manuel Campo	El Salvador	2:21.87	
—	2	7	Jarod Arroyo	Puerto Rico	DNS	
—	2	2	Roberto Bonilla	Independent Athletes Team	DNS	

=== Final B ===
The B final was also held on October 25.

Rank	Lane	Name	Nationality	Time	Notes
9	4	Tomas Peribonio	Ecuador	2:02.40	
10	5	Omar Pinzón	Colombia	2:03.36	
11	6	Hector Ruvalcaba	Mexico	2:03.82	
12	7	Tyler Christianson	Panama	2:04.32	
13	1	Juan García	Colombia	2:05.86	
14	8	Esteban Nuñez del Prado	Bolivia	2:06.21	
15	2	José Ángel Martínez	Mexico	2:06.48	
16	3	Patrick Groters	Aruba	2:06.69	

=== Final A ===
The A final was also held on October 25.

Rank	Lane	Name	Nationality	Time	Notes
1st place, gold medalist(s)	6	Finlay Knox	Canada	1:58.74	
2nd place, silver medalist(s)	7	Arsenio Bustos	United States	1:59.89	
3rd place, bronze medalist(s)	2	Leonardo Coelho	Brazil	2:00.58	
4	3	Collyn Gagne	Canada	2:00.79	
5	1	Erick Gordillo	Independent Athletes Team	2:01.57	
6	3	Vinicius Lanza	Brazil	2:01.63	
7	5	Mason Laur	United States	2:02.22	
8	2	Joaquín González Piñero	Argentina	2:03.63	
