= María José Poncell =

Chilean sailor

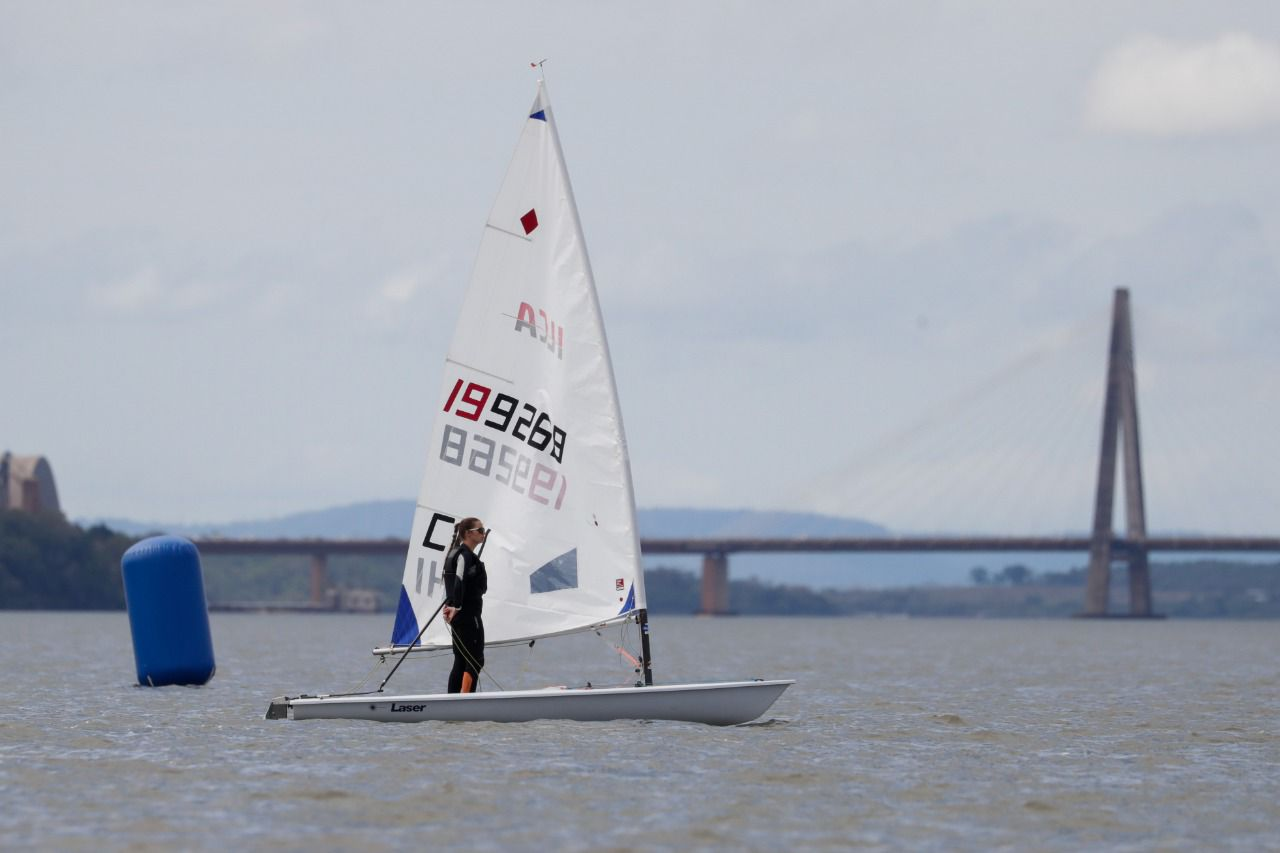

Personal information
- Born: 3 September 1995 (age 30) Santiago, Chile

Sport
- Country: Chile
- Sport: Sailing
- Event: Laser Radial
Medal record
Women's sailing
Representing Chile
Pan American Games
Bronze medal – third place	2023 Santiago	Sunfish

María José Poncell Maurin (born 3 September 1995) is a Chilean lawyer and sailor. She qualified for the 2024 Summer Olympics.

== Personal life ==
María José was born in Santiago, daughter of the Spanish sailor, Antonio Poncell, and the Chilean sailor, Marissa Maurin (former president of the Chilean Sailing Federation). She studied law at the Pontificia Universidad Católica de Chile. As a lawyer, she has worked as a legislative advisor and in the National Service for the Specialised Protection of Children and Adolescents in Chile.

Poncell is nicknamed "Coté".

== Career ==
She was introduced to sailing by her parents. She has participated in several competitions at national and international level, with Laser Radial (ILCA 6) her specialty.

She is 10-time national champion in the women's category in Laser Radial and had success at a number of international championships, including top 10 in the ISAF Junior World Championship, a gold medal in the 2016 Bolivarian Games, a bronze medal in the 2018 Odesur Games, and bronze medal in the 2023 Pan American Games.

She has been a national team member at the 2010 Youth Olympic Games, the 2015, 2019 and 2023 Pan American Games and the 2010, 2014, 2018 and 2022 Odesur Games.

Poncell was selected to represent Chile at the 2024 Summer Olympics, following in the footsteps of her mother who competed at the 1992 Games; they became the first mother-daughter Olympian duo in Chile's history.

=== Results ===
==== International championships ====
Year	Championship	Place	Discipline	Results
2008	Women World Championship	Roquetas de Mar, Spain	Snipe	8°
2009	Youth World Championship Sub-16	Armação dos Búzios, Brazil	ILCA 4	7°
2010	Youth Olympic Games	Singapore	Byte	22°
2011	South American Laser Championship	Montevideo, Uruguay	ILCA 6	13° (1° Sub-17)
2012	Youth World Championship	Dublin, Ireland	ILCA 6	10°
2012	Boliviarian Beach Games	Lima, Peru	ILCA 6	4°
2013	South American Laser Championship	Algarrobo, Chile	ILCA 6	5°
2014	South American Games	Concón, Chile	ILCA 6	8°
2014	Semana de Buenos Aires	Buenos Aires, Argentina	ILCA 6	9°
2014	South American Laser Championship	Paracas, Peru	ILCA 6	14°
2015	San Isidro Labrador	San Isidro, Argentina	ILCA 6	3°
2015	South American Laser Championship	Porto Alegre, Brazil	ILCA 6	9°
2015	Panamerican Games	Toronto, Canada	ILCA 6	
2016	Bolivarian Games	Iquique, Chile	ILCA 6	1°
2017	South American Laser Championship	Mar del Plata, Argentina	ILCA 6	9°
2018	North American Championship	Long Beach, United States	ILCA 6	16°
2018	South American Games	Cochabamba, Bolivia	ILCA 6	3°
2019	Pan American Games	Paracas, Peru	ILCA 6	13°
2019	Cup Brasil de Vela	Rio de Janeiro, Brazil	ILCA 6	4°
2023	Vaucluse Regatta	Sydney, Australia	ILCA 6	1°
2023	Sail Melbourne	Melbourne, Australia	ILCA 6	13°
2023	Sunfish North American	Springfield, United States	Sunfish Women	1°
2023	Sunfish South American	Paracas, Peru	Sunfish Women	2°
2023	Bolivarian Games	Santa Marta, Colombia	Sunfish Women	2º
2023	Pan American Games	Santiago/Algarrobo, Chile	Sunfish Women	3°

==== ILCA 6 National Championships ====
Año	Lugar	Resultado
2010	Algarrobo, Chile	1° Women
2011	Algarrobo, Chile	1° Women
2012	Rapel, Chile	1° Women
2013	Panguipulli, Chile	1° General
2014	Algarrobo, Chile	1° Women
2015	Rapel, Chile	1° Women
2016	Antofagasta, Chile	1° Women
2017	Frutillar, Chile	1° Women
2018	Dichato, Chile	1° Women
2019	Algarrobo, Chile	2° Women
2021	Valdivia, Chile	1° Women
