= Sailing at the 2023 Pan American Games – Women's Sunfish =

Women's Sunfish at the 2023 Pan American Games
- Venue: Cofradia Nautica del Pacifico
- Dates: October 28 - November 4
- Competitors: 10 from 10 nations

Medalists
Gold medal	Caterina Romero	Peru
Silver medal	Philipine van Aanholt	Aruba
Bronze medal	María José Poncell	Chile

The women's Sunfish competition of the sailing events at the 2023 Pan American Games in Santiago was held from October 28 to November 4 at the Cofradia Nautica del Pacifico.

Points were assigned based on the finishing position in each race (1 for first, 2 for second, etc.). The points were totaled from the top 9 results of the first 10 races, with lower totals being better. If a sailor was disqualified or did not complete the race, 11 points were assigned for that race (as there were 10 sailors in this competition). The top 5 sailors at that point competed in the final race, with placings counting double for final score. The sailor with the lowest total score won.

Caterina Romero from Peru dominated the regatta with wins in all but one race to celebrate the gold medal. Philipine van Aanholt from Aruba won a hard-fought battle against María José Poncell from Chile to get the silver medal, leaving the bronze medal to the rival.

== Schedule ==
All times are (UTC-3).

Date	Time	Round
October 28, 2023	16:26	Races 1 and 2
October 30, 2023	16:44	Races 3, 4 and 5
October 31, 2023	14:01	Race 6
November 1, 2023	16:14	Races 7 and 8
November 2, 2023	13:53	Races 9 and 10
November 4, 2023	12:40	Medal race

== Results ==
The results were as below.
Race M is the medal race.

Rank	Athlete	Nation	Race											Total Points	Net Points
Rank	Athlete	Nation	1	2	3	4	5	6	7	8	9	10	M	Total Points	Net Points
1st place, gold medalist(s)	Caterina Romero	Peru	1	1	1	1	1	1	1	(2)	1	1	2	13	11
2nd place, silver medalist(s)	Philipine van Aanholt	Aruba	(3)	3	2	2	2	3	3	3	3	2	6	32	29
3rd place, bronze medalist(s)	María José Poncell	Chile	2	2	3	4	4	2	2	(6)	2	4	8	39	33
4	Sofía D'Agostino	Argentina	6	5	4	3	3	5	4	(9)	5	5	4	53	44
5	Alejandra Valdez	Mexico	4	(7)	6	7	6	7	5	4	4	3	11; STP	64	57
6	Ana Sofía Cifuentes	Colombia	7	6	(10)	6	8	6	6	1	6	9	—N/a	65	55
7	Josselyn Montesdeoca	Independent Athletes Team	9	4	8	5	(10)	8	8	5	7	8	—N/a	72	62
8	Amanda Callahan	United States	8	(10)	5	8	7	4	7	7	9	7	—N/a	72	62
9	Jaimet Vázquez	Cuba	(10)	8	7	9	5	9	9	8	8	6	—N/a	79	69
10	Sabrina Prado	Venezuela	5	9	9	(10)	9	10	10	10	10	10	—N/a	92	82
