= 2019 Pan American Games Parade of Nations =

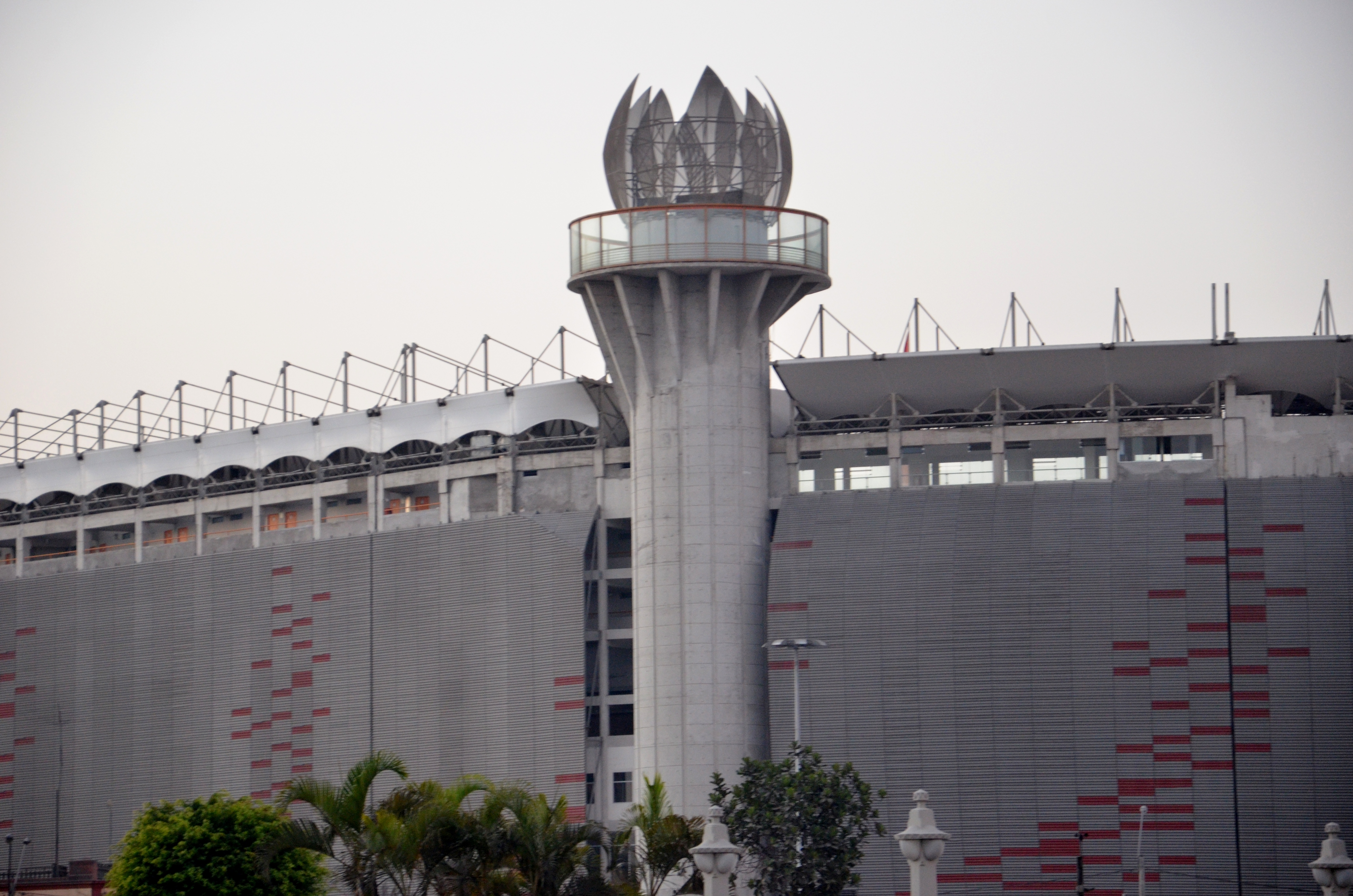
Estadio Nacional

During the Parade of Nations at the 2019 Pan American Games opening ceremony, on July 26, 2019, 41 athletes bearing the flags of their respective nations led their national delegations as they paraded into Estadio Nacional in the host city of Lima, Peru

== March order ==
Athletes entered the stadium in an order dictated by tradition. As the host of the first Pan American Games, Argentina's contingent entered the stadium first. The Peruvian delegation entered last, representing the host nation. The remaining countries entered in Spanish alphabetical order as per Pan American Sports Organization protocol.

== List ==
Order	Nation	Spanish	Flag bearer	Sport
1	Argentina	Argentina	Javier Conte	Sailing
2	Antigua and Barbuda	Antigua y Barbuda	Jalese Gordon	Sailing
3	Aruba	Aruba	Mack van den Eerenbeemt	Sailing
4	Bahamas	Bahamas	Justin Roberts	Tennis
5	Barbados	Barbados	Chelsea Tuach	Surfing
6	Belize	Belice	Jordan Santos	Triathlon
7	Bermuda	Bermuda	Cecilia Wollmann	Sailing
8	Bolivia	Bolivia	Conrrado Moscoso	Racquetball
9	Brazil	Brasil	Martine Grael and Kahena Kunze	Sailing
10	Canada	Canadá	Scott Tupper	Field hockey
11	Chile	Chile	Felipe Miranda	Water skiing
12	Colombia	Colombia	Yuberjen Martínez	Boxing
13	Costa Rica	Costa Rica	Shirley Cruz	Football
14	Cuba	Cuba	Mijaín López	Wrestling
15	Dominica	Dominica	Brendan Williams	Chef De Mission
16	Ecuador	Ecuador	Tamara Salazar	Weightlifting
17	El Salvador	El Salvador	Roberto Hernández	Archery
18	United States	Estados Unidos de América	Kathleen Sharkey	Field hockey
19	Grenada	Granada	Anderson Peters	Athletics
20	Guatemala	Guatemala	Jorge Vega	Gymnastics
21	Guyana	Guyana	Keevin Alicock	Boxing
22	Haiti	Haití	Aniya Louissaint	Taekwondo
23	Honduras	Honduras	Pedro Espinosa	Equestrian
24	Cayman Islands	Islas Caimán	Kemar Hyman	Athletics
25	British Virgin Islands	Islas Vírgenes Británicas	Thad Lettsome	Sailing
26	Virgin Islands	Islas Vírgenes de los Estados Unidos	Eduardo Garcia	Athletics
27	Jamaica	Jamaica	Christopher Binnie	Squash
28	Mexico	México	Jorge Orozco	Shooting
29	Nicaragua	Nicaragua	Swan Mendoza	Beach volleyball
30	Panama	Panamá	Carolena Carstens	Taekwondo
31	Paraguay	Paraguay	Alejandro Toranzos	Table tennis
32	Puerto Rico	Puerto Rico	Franklin Gómez	Wrestling
33	Dominican Republic	República Dominicana	Crismery Santana	Weightlifting
34	Saint Kitts and Nevis	San Cristóbal y Nieves	Jermaine Francis	Athletics
35	Saint Lucia	Santa Lucía	Luc Chevrier	Sailing
36	Saint Vincent and the Grenadines	San Vicente y las Granadinas	Zefal Bailey	Cycling
37	Suriname	Surinam	Dylan Darmohoetomo	Badminton
38	Trinidad and Tobago	Trinidad y Tobago	Andrew Lewis	Sailing
39	Uruguay	Uruguay	Julieta Mautone	Shooting
40	Venezuela	Venezuela	Elvismar Rodríguez	Judo
41	Peru	Perú	Stefano Peschiera	Sailing
