= Mack van den Eerenbeemt =

Aruban sailor (born 1998)

Mack van den Eerenbeemt (born July 1, 1998) is an Aruban sailor. He placed 14th in the techno event at the 2014 Summer Youth Olympics in Nanjing, China.

In 2019, van den Eerenbeemt represented Aruba at the 2019 Pan American Games in Lima, Peru, where he carried the flag of the country as part of the parade of nations during the opening ceremony. Mack van den Eerenbeemt would later go on to win Aruba's first ever Pan American Games medal, a bronze in the rs:x event.
