= Ashley Twichell =

American swimmer (born 1989)

Personal information
- Full name: Ashley Grace Twichell
- National team: United States
- Born: June 16, 1989 (age 37) Fayetteville, New York, U.S.
- Height: 5 ft 9 in (175 cm)
- Spouse: Derek Wall

Sport
- Sport: Swimming
- Strokes: Freestyle
- Club: Mission Viejo Nadadores
- College team: Duke University
- Coach: Dan Colella (Duke); Bill Rose (MV Nadadores)
Medal record
Women's swimming
Representing the United States
World Championships (LC)
Gold medal – first place	2011 Shanghai	5 km team open water
Gold medal – first place	2017 Budapest	5 km open water
Silver medal – second place	2017 Budapest	Team event
Bronze medal – third place	2011 Shanghai	5 km open water
Bronze medal – third place	2019 Gwangju	Team event
World Championships (SC)
Silver medal – second place	2016 Windsor	800 m freestyle
Pan American Games
Gold medal – first place	2023 Santiago	10 km open water
Silver medal – second place	2011 Guadalajara	800 m freestyle
Summer Universiade
Gold medal – first place	2013 Kazan	10 km open water

Ashley Grace Twichell (born June 16, 1989) is an American competition swimmer who specializes in long-distance freestyle and open-water events. She placed seventh in the 10 kilometer open water swim at the 2020 Summer Olympics. At 32 at her Olympic Games debut, she became the oldest first-time American swimmer at an Olympic Games since 1908.

== Early life and education ==
Twichell was born the youngest of four siblings to Terry and Deirdre Twichell on June 16, 1989, in Westchester County, New York. She lettered in swimming at Fayetteville-Manlius High School for three years and was an All-American her senior year in the 200 and 500 freestyle. She held school records in both the 200 and 500 freestyle, and was an honor student.

== Career ==
=== Duke University ===
Twichell swam for Duke University from 2007 to 2011 under Dan Colella, who specialized in backstroke at Sewanee, and served as head coach at Duke from 2002 to 2020. As a junior at Duke, she captured 19 first and four second place finishes, and as a distance swimming specialist, was an honorable mention All-American in the 1650 free. As a sophomore, Twichell was the first Duke University woman swimmer to go under the 16-minute mark in the mile swim, and broke the University records for the 500, 1000, and 1650 freestyle events. She was All-ACC and All-American champion in the 1,650-yard freestyle, and qualified for the NCAA Championship in all four years.

In 2014, Twichell worked for a period as a volunteer assistant coach for the swimming team.

=== 2011 ===
Twichell earned the first international medals of her career at the 2011 World Aquatics Championships in Shanghai, China, winning gold in the five km team and bronze in the five km open water events. Later that year, she earned a silver medal in the 800-meter freestyle at the 2011 Pan American Games.

Duke University Assistant Coach Dan Kane introduced Twichell to Hall of Fame Head Coach Bill Rose of the Mission Viejo Nadadores. Twichell moved to Mission Viejo in the summer of 2011 after graduating from Duke, helping her to qualify for her first international team.

=== 2012 ===
At the 2012 U.S. Olympic trials, she placed 10th in the 800-meter freestyle and 18th in the 400-meter freestyle, missing the Olympic team.

=== 2013 ===
In 2013, Twichell won gold in the ten km open water event at the 2013 Summer Universiade in Kazan, Russia.

=== 2016 World Swimming Championships ===
Twichell competed at the 2016 World Swimming Championships held in Windsor, Canada in December 2016. She won the silver medal in the 800-meter freestyle with a time of 8:11.95, finishing only behind Leah Smith.

=== 2017 World Aquatics Championships ===
At the 2017 World Aquatics Championships in July 2017 in Budapest, Hungary Twichell won two medals. The first medal she won was a gold medal with a time of 59:07.0 in the women's 5 kilometer open water swim. With her win, Twichell became the oldest American swimmer to win a world title in open water swimming as well as the oldest female swimmer for the United States since 2003 to win an international swimming title in an individual event. The day after winning a gold medal in an individual event, she won a silver medal in the 5 kilometer mixed team relay event.

=== 2019 World Aquatics Championships ===
In July 2019 at the 2019 World Aquatics Championships in Gwangju, South Korea, Twichell qualified for her first Olympic Games. Her sixth place finish in the 10 kilometer open water swim secured her spot on the U.S. Olympic Team in the marathon 10 kilometer swim for the 2020 Summer Olympics. Twichell and her teammate Haley Anderson, who also competed in the race and finished in the top ten, were the first athletes qualifying to represent the United States at the 2020 Summer Olympics in any sport. Twichell and her three relay teammates, Jordan Wilimovsky, Haley Anderson, and Michael Brinegar, won bronze in the 5 kilometer mixed team relay event.

=== 2020 ===
After months of pool closures and a lack of swim meets to compete in due to the COVID-19 pandemic, Twichell returned to racing in the pool in November 2020 at the 2020 U.S. Open Swimming Championships. At the Championships, she won a silver medal in the 1500-meter freestyle with a time of 16:18.11, finishing less than fourteen seconds behind gold medalist Bella Sims.

=== 2021 ===
==== 2021 US Open Water National Championships ====
In April 2021, Twichell competed in the 5 kilometer and 10 kilometer open water swims at the 2021 US Open Water National Championships in Fort Myers Beach, Florida. She finished second with a time of 2:03:01 in the women's 10 kilometer open water swim. In the women's 5 kilometer open water swim, Twichell finished first with a time of 1:01:31, winning the national title in the event.

==== 2020 US Olympic Trials ====
At the 2020 USA Swimming Olympic Trials (held in June 2021 due to the COVID-19 pandemic) Twichell competed in two individual events, the 400-meter freestyle and the 1500-meter freestyle. In the 400-meter freestyle Twichell placed eighth with a time of 4:10.51 in the prelims heats and decided not to swim in the final even though she qualified. In the 1500-meter freestyle she finished fifth in the final with a time of 16:01.62, not qualifying to swim the event at the 2020 Summer Olympics.

==== 2020 Summer Olympics ====
Twichell was 32 years old heading into the 2020 Summer Olympics in Tokyo, making her the oldest first-time American swimmer at an Olympic Games in over 100 years. Specifically, she was the oldest American swimmer at Olympic debut since James Green debuted at age 32 in 1908. In the swimming community, only one female U.S. swimmer at the Olympic Games had been older, Dara Torres who was 41 years old at the 2008 Summer Olympics.

In the 10 kilometer marathon swim on August 4, Twichell placed seventh behind sixth place finisher and American teammate Haley Anderson with a time of 1:59:37.9.

== Awards and honors ==
- 2019 Fayetteville-Manlius Hornets Hall of Fame inductee

== Personal ==
Twichell is married to Derek Wall. In November 2021, she announced she was pregnant with their first child.

== See also ==
- List of Duke University people
