= Sailing at the 2023 Pan American Games – Men's iQFoil =

Men's IQFoil at the 2023 Pan American Games
- Venue: Cofradia Nautica del Pacifico
- Dates: October 28 - November 3
- Competitors: 10 from 9 nations

Medalists
Gold medal	Mateus Isaac	Brazil
Silver medal	Ethan Westera	Aruba
Bronze medal	Noah Lyons	United States

The men's IQFoil competition of the sailing events at the 2023 Pan American Games in Santiago was held from October 28 to November 3 at the Cofradia Nautica del Pacifico.

Points were assigned based on the finishing position in each race (1 for first, 2 for second, etc.). The points were totaled from the top 13 results of the first 16 races, with lower totals being better. If a sailor was disqualified or did not complete the race, 11 points were assigned for that race (as there were 10 sailors in this competition). The top sailor at that point competed in the final race, while the second and third in the semi-final and the others in the quarter-final.

Mateus Isaac from Brazil finished third in the preliminary regatta, but won the semi-final and the final race to claim the gold medal. Ethan Westera from Aruba dominated the preliminary phase and achieved a direct spot in the final race, where he finished second. Noah Lyons from the United States received the bronze medal.

== Schedule ==
All times are (UTC-3).

Date	Time	Round
October 28, 2023	12:58	Races 1, 2, 3 and 4
October 30, 2023	15:02	Races 5, 6, 7, 8 and 9
October 31, 2023	13:05	Races 10, 11, 12 and 13
November 2, 2023	13:11	Races 14, 15 and 16
November 3, 2023	14:59	Quarter-final
November 3, 2023	15:48	Semi-final
November 3, 2023	16:13	Final

== Results ==
The results were as below.
Race M is the medal race.

Rank	Athlete	Nation	Race																			Total Points	Net Points
Rank	Athlete	Nation	1	2	3	4	5	6	7	8	9	10	11	12	13	14	15	16	QF	SF	F	Total Points	Net Points
1st place, gold medalist(s)	Mateus Isaac	Brazil	1	(5)	3	2	3	(5)	4	3	3	2	2	4	(11); UFD	2	3	1	—N/a	1	1	54	33
2nd place, silver medalist(s)	Ethan Westera	Aruba	2	1	1	1	(5)	1	2	1	1	3	1	2	(11); UFD	1	4	4	—N/a	—N/a	2	41	21
3rd place, bronze medalist(s)	Noah Lyons	United States	3	3	2	3	2 STP	3	1	2	(4)	1	4	(5)	(11); UFD	4	1	2	—N/a	2	3	51	31
4	Francisco Saubidet	Argentina	5	4	4	4	4	4	5	5	2	4	(8)	1	(11); UFD	5	(7)	7	2	3	—N/a	80	54
5	Simón Gómez	Colombia	4	7	8	7	(9)	(9)	(9)	8	5	9	7	9	2	9	9	9	1	4	—N/a	120	93
6	Jeronimo Stephenson	Mexico	(8)	2	7	6	7	(8)	7	7	8	8	6	8	(11); UFD	7	8	8	3	—N/a	—N/a	116	89
7	José Gregorio Pérez	Venezuela	(6)	(8)	(6)	5	2	2	3	4	6	6	3	3	1	3	2	5	4	—N/a	—N/a	65	45
8	Marcos Quiroga	Argentina	9	(11); DNF	9	9	8	7	6	6	(11); UFD	7	9	6	(11); UFD	6	5	3	5	—N/a	—N/a	123	90
9	Samuel Camacho	Dominican Republic	7	6	5	(8)	6	6	(8)	(9)	7	5	5	7	3	8	6	6	6	—N/a	—N/a	102	77
10	Andrés Colombo	Chile	(11); DNF	(11); DNF	(11); DNF	11; DNF	11; DNF	11; DNF	11; DNF	11; DNF	11; DNF	10	10	10	4	10	10	10	7	—N/a	—N/a	163	130
