= Shanayah Howell =

Aruban BMX racer (born 1999)

Shanayah Howell OLY
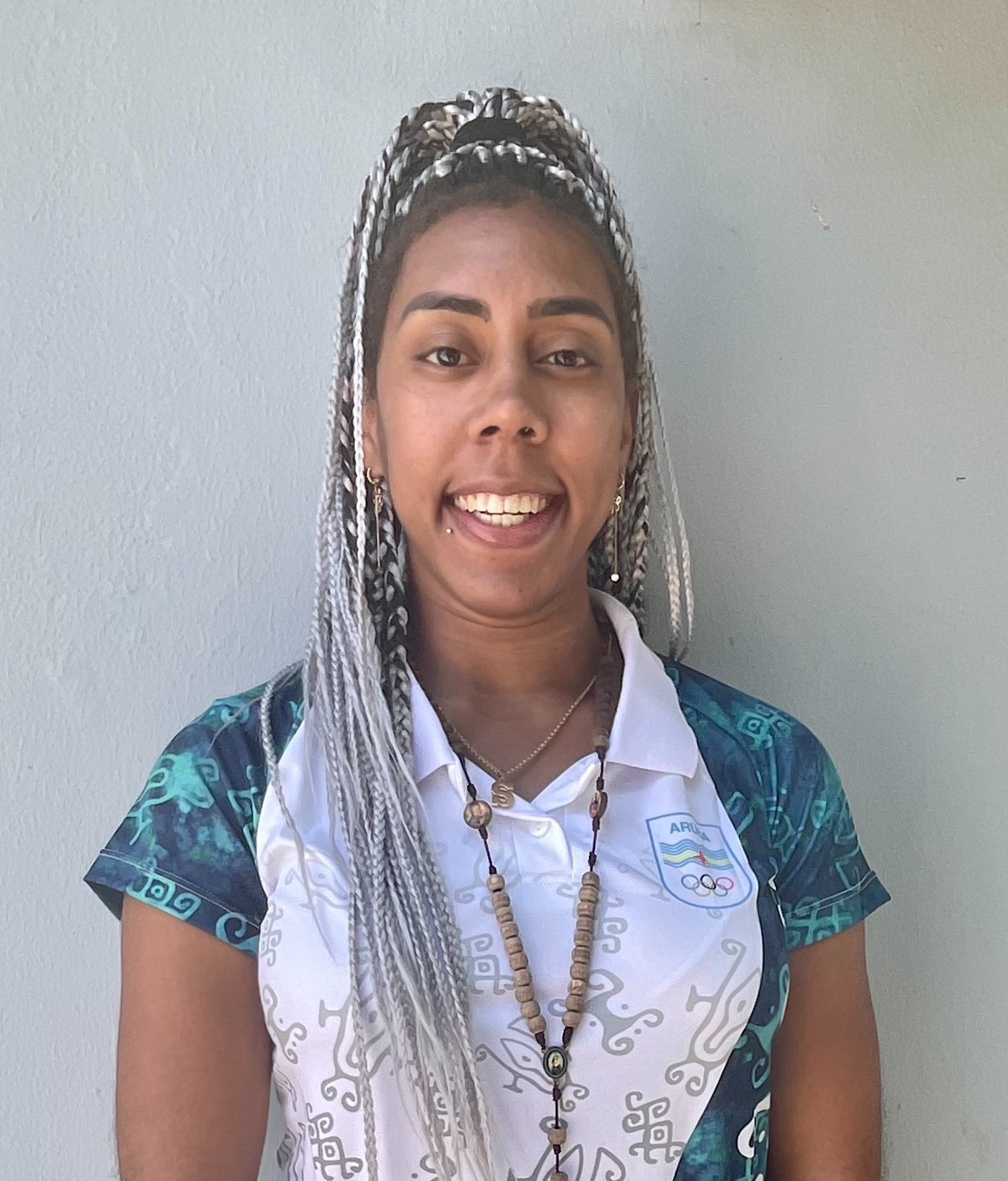
- Howell in 2023

Personal information
- Born: 7 April 1999 (age 27) Aruba

Cycling career
- Sport: Cycling
- Discipline: BMX racing
Medal record
Women's BMX racing
Representing Aruba
Pan American Championships
Bronze medal – third place	2022 Santiago del Estero	BMX racing
Central American and Caribbean Games
Bronze medal – third place	2023 San Salvador	BMX racing

Shanayah Howell OLY (born 7 April 1999) is an Aruban BMX racer. She competed in the women's BMX racing event at the 2024 Summer Olympics.

She was the closing ceremony flag bearer for Aruba at the 2024 Summer Olympics.
