= List of Aruban records in swimming =

The Aruban records in swimming are the fastest ever performances of swimmers from Aruba, which are recognised and ratified by the Aruba Aquatics Federation (AAF).

All records were set in finals unless noted otherwise.

== Long Course (50 m) ==
=== Men ===
Event	Time		Name	Club	Date	Meet	Location	Ref
50 m freestyle	21.93		Mikel Schreuders	CN Marseille	30 November 2023	U.S. Open	Greensboro, United States	
100 m freestyle	48.40	h	Mikel Schreuders	Aruba	21 June 2022	World Championships	Budapest, Hungary	
200 m freestyle	1:48.63		Mikel Schreuders	Aruba	24 July 2018	CAC Games	Barranquilla, Colombia	
400 m freestyle	3:58.38		Mikel Schreuders	Aruba	2 July 2017	CCCAN	Couva, Trinidad and Tobago	
800 m freestyle	8:22.96	h, not ratified	Daniel Jacobs	Aruba	23 July 2019	World Championships	Gwangju, South Korea	
1500 m freestyle	16:18.17		Patrick Groters	Aruba	4 April 2015	CARIFTA Championships	Bridgetown, Barbados	
50 m backstroke	25.44		Patrick Groters	Aruba	30 July 2026	CAC Games	Santo Domingo, Dominican Republic	
100 m backstroke	54.83		Patrick Groters	Aruba	31 July 2026	CAC Games	Santo Domingo, Dominican Republic	
200 m backstroke	1:59.91		Patrick Groters	Aruba	1 August 2026	CAC Games	Santo Domingo, Dominican Republic	
50m breaststroke	26.98		Mikel Schreuders	CN Marseille	16 December 2023	Meeting of Hortillons	Amiens, France	
100m breaststroke	1:02.54	h	Mikel Schreuders	CN Marseille	2 June 2024	Mare Nostrum	Monte Carlo, Monaco	
200m breaststroke	2:18.55	b	Jordy Groters	Aruba	15 July 2015	Pan American Games	Toronto, Canada	
50m butterfly	23.65	h	Mikel Schreuders	Aruba	23 July 2023	World Championships	Fukuoka, Japan	
100m butterfly	54.54	h	Mikel Schreuders	CN Marseille	21 June 2024	French Championships	Chartres, France	
200m butterfly	2:10.76	h	Jaydon Croes	Aruba	4 September 2022	World Junior Championships	Lima, Peru	
200m individual medley	2:00.55	h	Patrick Groters	Aruba	23 June 2024	Sette Colli Trophy	Rome, Italy	
400m individual medley	4:27.69		Patrick Groters	Aruba	16 April 2017	CARIFTA Championships	Nassau, Bahamas	
4×50m freestyle relay	1:37.33		Joseph Winterdal; Daniel Jacobs; Patrick Groters; Mikel Schreuders	Stingray	2 June 2016	-		
4×100m freestyle relay	3:33.55		Daniel Jacobs; Patrick Groters; Joseph Winterdal; Mikel Schreuders	Aruba	29 June 2016	CISC	Nassau, Bahamas	
4×100m freestyle relay	3:22.89	ratified, but later rescinded	Davy Bisslik; M.Tromp; E.Bisslik; S.Eman	Aruba Dolphins	20 May 2000	-		
4×200m freestyle relay	7:55.80		Daniel Jacobs (1:56.72); Joseph Winterdal (2:03.69); Patrick Groters (1:59.72); Mikel Schreuders (1:55.67)	Aruba	1 July 2016 (Note: by official result source; 29 June 2016 by federation source)	CISC	Nassau, Bahamas	
4×50m medley relay	1:55.60		T. Wernet; R. Hoen; E. Mulder; R. Postma	Aruba Dolphins	5 June 2014			
4×100m medley relay	3:54.79		Patrick Groters; Mikel Schreuders; Joseph Winterdal; Daniel Jacobs	Aruba	29 June 2016	CISC	Nassau, Bahamas	
4×100m medley relay	3:53.88	not ratified	Patrick Groters (57.17); Mikel Schreuders (1:06.62); Jordy Groters (57.44); Daniel Jacobs (52.65)	Aruba	25 July 2018	CAC Games	Barranquilla, Colombia	

Legend: # – Record awaiting ratification by Arubaanse Zwembond; WR – World record; AM – Americas record; e – equalled existing record;
Records not set in finals: h – heat; sf – semifinal; r – relay 1st leg; rh – relay heat 1st leg; b – B final; † – en route to final mark; so – swim-off; tt – time trial

=== Women ===
Event	Time		Name	Club	Date	Meet	Location	Ref
50 m freestyle	25.51		Elisabeth Timmer	Aruba	28 July 2026	CAC Games	Santo Domingo, Dominican Republic	
100 m freestyle	56.34		Elisabeth Timmer	Aruba	29 July 2026	CAC Games	Santo Domingo, Dominican Republic	
200 m freestyle	2:05.66		Allyson Ponson	Aruba	6 March 2020	Southern Zone South Sectional Championships		
400 m freestyle	4:24.20		Daniella van den Berg	Aruba	3 March 2016	Arena Pro Swim Series	Orlando, United States	
800 m freestyle	8:58.09		Daniella van den Berg	Aruba	3 March 2016	Arena Pro Swim Series	Orlando, United States	
1500 m freestyle	17:07.88	not ratified	Daniella van den Berg	Seminole Aquatics	5 August 2018	USA Futures Swimming Championships	Cary, United States	
50m backstroke	30.16	b	Elisabeth Timmer	Aruba	30 July 2026	CAC Games	Santo Domingo, Dominican Republic	
100m backstroke	1:05.58	b	Elisabeth Timmer	Aruba	31 July 2026	CAC Games	Santo Domingo, Dominican Republic	
200m backstroke	2:28.23		Elisabeth Timmer	Stingray	6 June 2021	Aruban Championships	Savaneta, Aruba	
50m breaststroke	32.68	h	Avigayle Tromp	Aruba	28 July 2026	CAC Games	Santo Domingo, Dominican Republic	
100m breaststroke	1:12.04		Avigayle Tromp	Aruba	28 July 2026	CAC Games	Santo Domingo, Dominican Republic	
200m breaststroke	2:45.45		Ashley Bransford	Aruba	23 June 2012	CISC	Savaneta, Aruba	
50m butterfly	27.31		Elisabeth Timmer	Aruba	14 September 2026	South American Games	Santa Fe, Argentina	
100m butterfly	1:02.71		Avigayle Tromp	Aruba	11 August 2025	Junior Pan American Games	Asunción, Paraguay	
200m butterfly	2:25.41		Daniella van den Berg	Aruba	6 May 2014	Dominican Republic Open	Dominican Republic	
200m individual medley	2:24.41	b	Avigayle Tromp	Aruba	14 August 2025	Junior Pan American Games	Asunción, Paraguay	
400m individual medley	5:09.40		Daniella van den Berg	Aruba	28 June 2014	CISC	Bridgetown, Barbados	
4×50m freestyle relay	1:50.01		G. Ponson; C. Maduro; Daniella van den Berg; Allyson Ponson	Aruba	12 April 2012			
4×100m freestyle relay	3:56.20		Marayah Tromp (59.17); Britta Schwengle (1:00.62); Mikaela van den Berg (1:00.45); Elisabeth Timmer (55.96)	Aruba	29 July 2026	CAC Games	Santo Domingo, Dominican Republic	
4×200m freestyle relay	8:50.52		Keeley Maduro; A. van den Berg; R. Maduro; Florence Kock	Aruba	29 June 2016	CISC	Nassau, Bahamas	
4×200m freestyle relay	8:45.69	h, not ratified		Aruba	2 April 2018	CARIFTA Championships	Kingston, Jamaica	
4×50m medley relay	2:13.42		G. Ponson; C. Maduro; Daniella van den Berg; Allyson Ponson	Stingray	22 October 2010	-		
4×100m medley relay	4:37.84		Elisabeth Timmer; Anahi Schreuders; Keeley Maduro; Florence Kock	Aruba	23 June 2015	-		

Legend: # – Record awaiting ratification by Arubaanse Zwembond; WR – World record; AM – Americas record; e – equalled existing record;
Records not set in finals: h – heat; sf – semifinal; r – relay 1st leg; rh – relay heat 1st leg; b – B final; † – en route to final mark; so – swim-off; tt – time trial

=== Mixed relay ===
Event	Time		Name	Club	Date	Meet	Location	Ref
4×50 m freestyle relay	1:42.75			Stingray	4 June 2015			
4×100 m freestyle relay	3:36.66	h	Mikel Schreuders (49.02); Patrick Groters (51.92); Avigayle Tromp (58.55); Elisabeth Timmer (57.17)	Aruba	2 August 2025	World Championships	Singapore, Singapore	
4×50 m medley relay	1:56.19		Patrick Groters; Anahi Schreuders; Joseph Winterdal	Stingray	13 May 2016			
4×100 m medley relay	3:59.70	h	Patrick Groters (56.97); Mikel Schreuders (1:02.15); Avigayle Tromp (1:03.57); Elisabeth Timmer (57.01)	Aruba	30 July 2025	World Championships	Singapore, Singapore	

Legend: # – Record awaiting ratification by Arubaanse Zwembond; WR – World record; AM – Americas record; e – equalled existing record;
Records not set in finals: h – heat; so – swim-off

== Short Course (25 m) ==
=== Men ===
Event	Time		Name	Club	Date	Meet	Location	Ref
50m freestyle	21.60	h	Mikel Schreuders	Aruba	14 December 2024	World Championships	Budapest, Hungary	
100m freestyle	47.01	sf	Mikel Schreuders	Aruba	20 December 2021	World Championships	Abu Dhabi, United Arab Emirates	
200m freestyle	1:45.06		Mikel Schreuders	Aruba	5 November 2022	French Championships	Chartres, France	
400m freestyle	4:02.42	h	Patrick Groters	Aruba	5 December 2014	World Championships	Doha, Qatar	
800m freestyle								
1500m freestyle	16:51.38		Micky van der Vaart	Aruba	28 February 2006	World Cup (Note: by federation source but FINA World Cup did not take place that day)		
50m backstroke	25.21	b	Patrick Groters	Giants Aquatics	24 October 2026	Dutch Qualifiers	Rotterdam, Netherlands	
100m backstroke	54.02		Patrick Groters	Giants Aquatics	23 October 2026	Dutch Qualifiers	Rotterdam, Netherlands	
200m backstroke	1:58.27	h	Patrick Groters	Aruba	15 December 2024	World Championships	Budapest, Hungary	
50m breaststroke	26.36	h	Mikel Schreuders	Aruba	14 December 2024	World Championships	Budapest, Hungary	
100m breaststroke	58.48		Mikel Schreuders	Aruba	18 November 2023	Interclub All Categories - South Region - Group A	Istres, France	
200m breaststroke	2:12.68	h	Jordy Groters	Aruba	8 December 2016	World Championships	Windsor, Canada	
50m butterfly	24.28	h	Patrick Groters	Giants Aquatics	22 October 2026	Dutch Qualifiers	Rotterdam, Netherlands	
100m butterfly	53.28	b	Patrick Groters	Giants Aquatics	25 October 2026	Dutch Qualifiers	Rotterdam, Netherlands	
200m butterfly	2:02.99		Patrick Groters	Giants Aquatics	11 October 2024	TYR Giants Open	Savaneta, Aruba	
100m individual medley	52.34	sf	Mikel Schreuders	Aruba	15 December 2022	World Championships	Melbourne, Australia	
200m individual medley	1:57.61	h	Patrick Groters	Aruba	10 December 2024	World Championships	Budapest, Hungary	
400m individual medley	4:35.73	h	Patrick Groters	Aruba	4 December 2014	World Championships	Doha, Qatar	
4×50m freestyle relay								
4×100m freestyle relay								
4×200m freestyle relay								
4×50m medley relay								
4×100m medley relay								

Legend: # – Record awaiting ratification by Arubaanse Zwembond; WR – World record; AM – Americas record; e – equalled existing record;
Records not set in finals: h – heat; sf – semifinal; r – relay 1st leg; rh – relay heat 1st leg; b – B final; † – en route to final mark; so – swim-off; tt – time trial

=== Women ===
Event	Time		Name	Club	Date	Meet	Location	Ref
50 m freestyle	24.88		Elisabeth Timmer	Albion	25 October 2026	Dutch Qualifiers	Rotterdam, Netherlands	
100 m freestyle	54.44		Elisabeth Timmer	Albion	23 October 2026	Dutch Qualifiers	Rotterdam, Netherlands	
200 m freestyle	2:03.45	h	Elisabeth Timmer	Aruba	16 December 2021	World Championships	Abu Dhabi, United Arab Emirates	
400 m freestyle	4:25.07 (Note: by official result source; 4:21.33 on December 10, 2016 at same Championships by AAF source, but source and competition event unclear)	h, †	Daniella van den Berg	Aruba	7 December 2016	World Championships	Windsor, Canada	
800 m freestyle	8:58.72	h	Daniella van den Berg	Aruba	7 December 2016	World Championships	Windsor, Canada	
1500 m freestyle								
50 m backstroke	33.58		Ashley Bransford	Stingray	31 March 2007	Bulado Meet		
100 m backstroke	1:11.70		Adrienne Fraser	Aruba	22 July 2007	Weganan di Reino		
200 m backstroke	2:36.82		Adrienne Fraser	Aruba	22 July 2007	Weganan di Reino		
50m breaststroke	33.90	h	Anahi Schreuders	Aruba	11 December 2018	World Championships	Hangzhou, China	
100m breaststroke	1:13.41	h	Anahi Schreuders	Aruba	14 December 2018	World Championships	Hangzhou, China	
200m breaststroke	2:51.39		Adrienne Fraser	Aruba	22 July 2007	Weganan di Reino		
50m butterfly	26.48		Elisabeth Timmer	Albion	22 October 2026	Dutch Qualifiers	Rotterdam, Netherlands	
100m butterfly	1:10.14		Marellys Robles de Medina	Aruba Dolphins	2 October 2009	Bulado Meet		
200m butterfly								
100m individual medley	1:01.92		Elisabeth Timmer	Albion	24 October 2026	Dutch Qualifiers	Rotterdam, Netherlands	
200m individual medley	2:34.15		Adrienne Fraser	Aruba	22 July 2007	Weganan di Reino		
400m individual medley								
4×50m freestyle relay								
4×100m freestyle relay								
4×200m freestyle relay								
4×50m medley relay								
4×100m medley relay								

Legend: # – Record awaiting ratification by Arubaanse Zwembond; WR – World record; AM – Americas record; e – equalled existing record;
Records not set in finals: h – heat; sf – semifinal; r – relay 1st leg; rh – relay heat 1st leg; b – B final; † – en route to final mark; so – swim-off; tt – time trial
