= Aruba at the Pan American Games =

- Flag of Aruba
- IOC code: ARU
- NOC: Aruban Olympic Committee
- Website: www.olympicaruba.com
- Medals Ranked 42nd: Gold 0 Silver 2 Bronze 2 Total 4

Pan American Games appearances (overview)
- 1987; 1991; 1995; 1999; 2003; 2007; 2011; 2015; 2019; 2023

Other related appearances
- Netherlands Antilles (1987–pres.)

Aruba has competed at every edition of the Pan American Games since the tenth edition of the multi-sport event in 1987. Aruba did not compete at the first and only Pan American Winter Games in 1990.

== Medal count ==
To sort the tables by host city, total medal count, or any other column, click on the icon next to the column title.

== Pan American Games ==
=== Medals by games ===
Year	Ref.	Edition	Host city	Rank	Gold	Silver	Bronze	Total
1951		I	(Argentina) Buenos Aires	Did not participate				
1955		II	Mexico City	Did not participate				
1959		III	(United States) Chicago	Did not participate				
1963		IV	(Brazil) São Paulo	Did not participate				
1967		V	(Canada) Winnipeg	Did not participate				
1971		VI	(Colombia) Cali	Did not participate				
1975		VII	Mexico City	Did not participate				
1979		VIII	(Puerto Rico) San Juan	Did not participate				
1983		IX	(Venezuela) Caracas	Did not participate				
1987		X	(United States) Indianapolis	—	0	0	0	0
1991		XI	(Cuba) Havana	—	0	0	0	0
1995		XII	(Argentina) Mar del Plata	—	0	0	0	0
1999		XIII	(Canada) Winnipeg	—	0	0	0	0
2003		XIV	(Dominican Republic) Santo Domingo	—	0	0	0	0
2007		XV	(Brazil) Rio de Janeiro	—	0	0	0	0
2011		XVI	(Mexico) Guadalajara	—	0	0	0	0
2015		XVII	(Canada) Toronto	—	0	0	0	0
2019		XVIII	(Peru) Lima	30th	0	0	1	1
2023		XIX	(Chile) Santiago	23rd	0	2	1	3
Total				42nd	0	2	2	4

=== Medals by sport ===
Sport	Gold	Silver	Bronze	Total
Sailing	0	0	1	1
Totals (1 entries)	0	0	1	1

== Winter Pan American Games ==
=== Medals by games ===
Year	Ref.	Edition	Host city	Rank	Gold	Silver	Bronze	Total
1990		I	(Argentina) Las Leñas	Did not participate				
Total				—	0	0	0	0

== Junior Pan American Games ==
=== Medals by games ===
Games	Gold	Silver	Bronze	Total	Rank
(Colombia) 2021 Cali-Valle	2	1	0	3	17th
(Paraguay) 2025 Asunción	Future event				
Total	2	1	0	3	17th
