= Daniella van den Berg =

Aruban swimmer (born 1996)

Personal information
- Born: 24 May 1996 (age 29) Paradera, Aruba
- Height: 1.65 m (5 ft 5 in)

Sport
- Country: Aruba
- Sport: Swimming
- Club: Davie Nadadores, Davie, Florida
- Team: Azurza Florida Aquatics

Daniella Paulina van den Berg (born 24 May 1996 at Paradera, Aruba) is an Aruban swimmer. At the 2012 Summer Olympics, she competed in the Women's 800 metre freestyle, finishing in 34th place overall in the heats, failing to qualify for the final.
