= Netherlands Antilles at the Pan American Games =

- IOC code: AHO
- NOC: Netherlands Antilles Olympic Committee
- Medals Ranked 19th: Gold 5 Silver 9 Bronze 17 Total 31

Pan American Games appearances (overview)
- 1959; 1963; 1967; 1971; 1975; 1979; 1983; 1987; 1991; 1995; 1999; 2003; 2007; 2011

Other related appearances
- Aruba (1959–pres.)

The Netherlands Antilles competed at every edition of the Pan American Games from the second edition of the multi-sport event in 1955 until the 2011 games. Netherlands Antilles did not compete at the only Winter Pan American Games. 2011 marked the last appearance for the country, albeit under the Pan American Sports Organization flag. Since 2015, Curaçaoan and St. Maartener athletes have been eligible to represent Aruba.

== Medal count ==
To sort the tables by host city, total medal count, or any other column, click on the icon next to the column title.

=== Summer ===
Year	Ref.	Edition	Host city	Rank	Gold	Silver	Bronze	Total
1951		I	(Argentina) Buenos Aires	Did not participate				
1955		II	Mexico City	16th	0	1	3	4
1959		III	(United States) Chicago	18th	0	0	1	1
1963		IV	(Brazil) São Paulo	12th	0	4	2	6
1967		V	(Canada) Winnipeg	19th	0	0	1	1
1971		VI	(Colombia) Cali	11th	1	2	1	4
1975		VII	Mexico City	16th	0	1	0	1
1979		VIII	(Puerto Rico) San Juan	18th	0	0	1	1
1983		IX	(Venezuela) Caracas	—	0	0	0	0
1987		X	(United States) Indianapolis	23rd	0	0	1	1
1991		XI	(Cuba) Havana	—	0	0	0	0
1995		XII	(Argentina) Mar del Plata	14th	1	1	4	6
1999		XIII	(Canada) Winnipeg	18th	1	0	0	1
2003		XIV	(Dominican Republic) Santo Domingo	27th	0	0	1	1
2007		XV	(Brazil) Rio de Janeiro	19th	1	0	1	2
2011		XVI	(Mexico) Guadalajara	17th	1	0	1	2
2015		XVII	(Canada) Toronto	Did not participate				
Total				19th	5	9	17	31

=== Winter ===
Year	Ref.	Edition	Host city	Rank	Gold	Silver	Bronze	Total
1990		I	(Argentina) Las Leñas	Did not participate				
Total				—	0	0	0	0
