= Flag of Aruba =

Aruba
- Use: Civil and state flag
- Proportion: 2:3
- Adopted: 18 March 1976; 50 years ago
- Design: A medium blue field with a white fimbriated (bordered) red four-pointed star in its upper hoist corner and two narrow horizontal yellow stripes in its lower half.
- Designed by: Whitney Smith
- Use: Governor's standard
- Adopted: 29 October 1985; 41 years ago 1 January 1986; 40 years ago (in use)
- Design: A white field with along the top and bottom three horizontal stripes red, white, and blue. Blue disk in the center with red, white bordered star and two yellow stripes.

The national flag of Aruba was adopted on 18 March 1976, along with the official anthem "Aruba Dushi Tera". The flag was partially designed by vexillologist Whitney Smith. On 18 March, Aruba celebrates National Anthem and Flag Day, marked by local events across the island. It is also a significant day as it represents the Kingdom of the Netherlands giving Aruba an autonomous status.

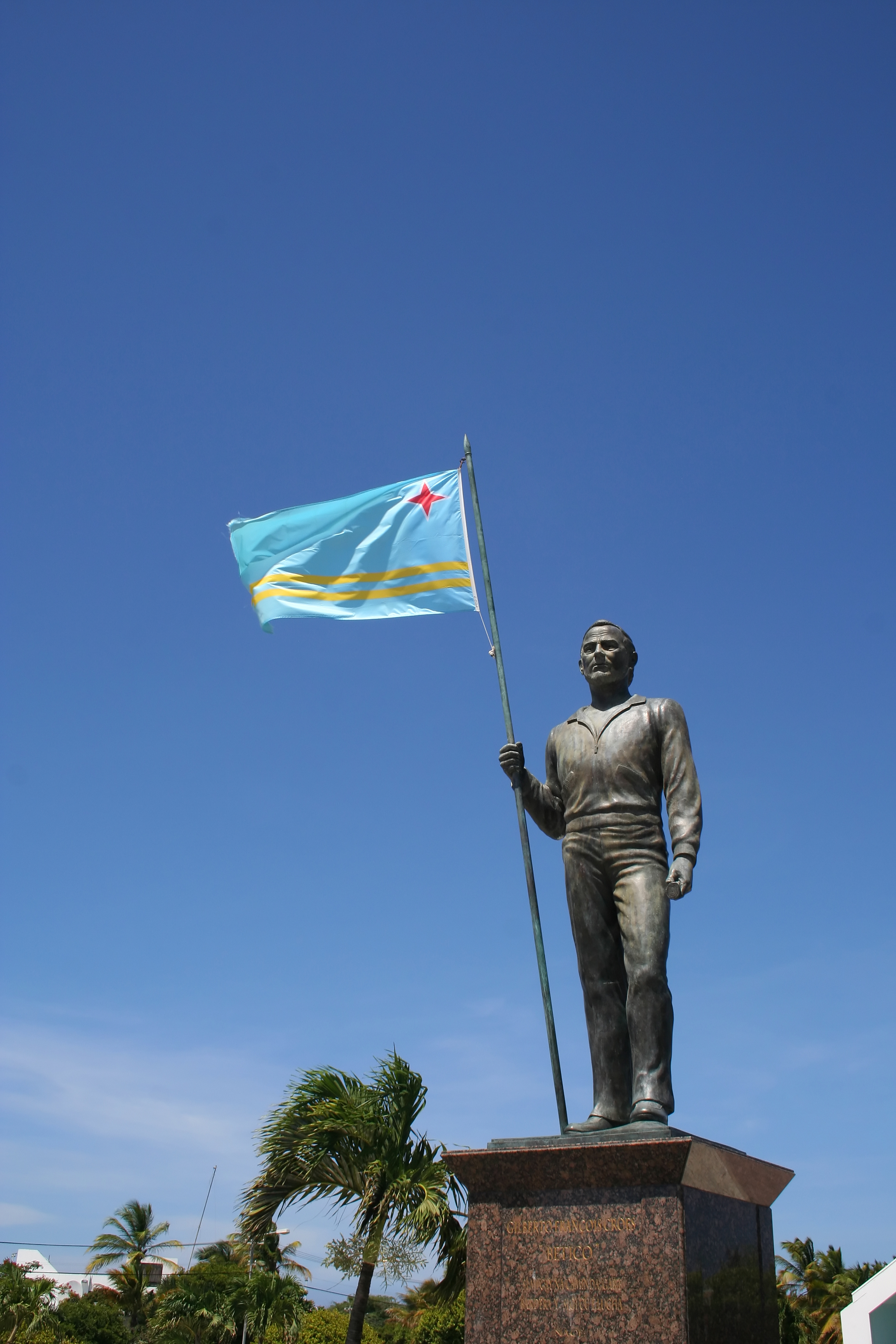
Statue of Betico Croes with flag in Oranjestad

== Description ==
The flag is rectangular and features four colors: yellow, blue, red, and white. Its width-to-length ratio is 2:3. The field color of the flag is Larkspur, identified as "no. 196" in the British colour council's "Dictionary of Colour Standards" or PMS 279 C in the Pantone Matching System. The lower 1/3 of the flag is divided into three horizontal bands of equal width, colored yellow, blue, and yellow respectively. Each strip's width is 1/18 of the flag's total width. The top band starts 2/3 of the way down from the top of the flag. The yellow stripes are in PMS 109 C, and the middle band is colored PMS 279 C. Below these three bands is a wide border, 1/6 of the flag' width, in PMS 279 C. In the canton or upper hoisting plane of the flag, there is a regular four-pointed star. The star's horizontal and vertical meridians align with the flag's edges, and a line drawn from any inner corner through the center to the opposite inner corner is 1/3 length of the stars' horizontal or vertical median. The star is colored red, PMS 032 C, with a white border (fimbriation). The total length of the star, including the fringe, is 1/3 of the flag's width. The highest point of the star is positioned inward from the hoist edge at a distance equal to 1/18 of the flag's width.

Construction sheet. Aspect ratio 2:3.

Color scheme
Scheme	Blue	Yellow	Red	White
Pantone	279 C	109 C	032 C	N.A.
CMYK	69, 34, 0, 0	0, 18, 100, 0	0, 84, 77, 5	0, 0, 0, 0
RGB	65,143,222	255, 210, 0	246, 52, 63	255, 255, 255
Hexadecimal	418FDE	F7D417	EF3340	FFFFFF
RAL	5012	1023	3028	N.A.

== Symbolism ==
The flag of Aruba incorporates four colors and symbols, each carrying significance. The light blue color represents the sea surrounding the island, symbolizing its strong connection to the ocean.

Yellow signifies abundance and solidarity. The horizontal lines symbolize the economic prosperity derived from industries like gold mining and Aloe Vera production in the past, as well as the current reliance on tourism. Yellow also represents the vibrant yellow flowers of local flora such as the “Kibrahacha” (Tabebuia billbergii), “Palo di Brazil" (Haematoxylon brasiletto), “Bonchi di Strena” (Parkinsonia aculeata), “Curahout” (Peltophorum acutifolium), “Tuturutu” (Yellow Dwarf Poincianas, Caesalpinia pulcherrima) and “Wanglo” (Puncture vine Tribulus cistoides).

The horizontal yellow stripes on the flag symbolize Aruba's freedom and distinct status within the Kingdom of the Netherlands, achieved on 1 January 1986.

Additionally, the color white on the flag symbolizes peace and carries symbolic meaning. It represents the island's pristine beaches and signifies the purity of the hearts of the Aruban people, who strive for justice, order, and liberty.

The red star on the flag symbolizes the four points of the compass, symbolizing the diverse origins of the Aruban population, which attracts people from around the world. It also represents Aruba itself, surrounded by the blue sea and the historic "Palo di Brazil" industry. Red symbolizes love and pays tribute to the indigenous Arubans who lost their lives during the confrontation with the French at Frenchman's pass.

== Governor's standard ==
The governor of Aruba, as the representative of the Monarch of the Netherlands, has a specific standard. According to the "Album des pavillons", the flag of the governor of Aruba consists of a white field with three horizontal stripes along the top and bottom, colored red, white, and blue. Each stripe occupies 1/12th of the flag's height. In the center of the flag, there is a light blue disk with a diameter equal to 5/12th the flag's height. On the disk, the red, white-bordered star and two yellow stripes from the flag of Aruba are placed. The center of the star is positioned at the horizontal midpoint of the flag, at a distance of 5/48th of the flag's height above the center of the disk. All other dimensions of the flag are proportional to those of the flag of Aruba. This design was adopted by Order in Council on 29 October 1985, and became effective on 1 January 1986.

== Proposed flags ==
The island of Aruba was once part of the Netherlands Antilles and used the former Netherlands territorial flag. In January 1976, committee was formed to choose a flag specifically for Aruba. Out of 693 design entries, 157 were considered, and eventually, three proposals were selected. Since one of the chosen designs was challenging to manufacture, Smith made a new proposal (after his previous flag was rejected). A committee worked on the winning proposal and ultimately created the flag that was adopted.

Sample of proposals
Selected proposals

Proposal by J.W. Klein (1976)

Proposal by Rosendo Feliciano (1976)

Proposal by W.J. Fransen (winner) (1976)

Whitney Smith's proposals

1. Flag of Aruba proposed by American vexillologist Whitney Smith (1976)

2. Flag of Aruba proposed by American vexillologist Whitney Smith (1976)

== See also ==
- Coat of arms of Aruba
- Flag of the Netherlands
- Flag of Curaçao
- Flag of Tunisia
