= List of flag bearers for Aruba at the Olympics =

Aruba at the Olympics
- IOC code: ARU
- NOC: Aruban Olympic Committee
- Website: www.olympicaruba.com (in Papiamento)
- Medals: Gold 0 Silver 0 Bronze 0 Total 0

Summer appearances
- 1988; 1992; 1996; 2000; 2004; 2008; 2012; 2016; 2020; 2024

Other related appearances
- Netherlands Antilles (1952–2008)

This is a list of flag bearers who have represented Aruba at the Olympics.

Flag bearers carry the national flag of their country at the opening ceremony of the Olympic Games.

#	Event year	Season	Flag bearer	Sport
1	1988	Summer	Bito Maduro	Judo
2	1992	Summer	Lucien Dirksz	Cycling
3	1996	Summer	Junior Faro	Weightlifting
4	2000	Summer	Richard Rodriguez	Athletics
5	2004	Summer	Roshendra Vrolijk	Swimming
6	2008	Summer	Fiderd Vis	Judo
7	2012	Summer	Jemal Le Grand	Swimming
8	2016	Summer	Nicole van der Velden	Sailing
9	2020	Summer	Allyson Ponson	Swimming
9	2020	Summer	Mikel Schreuders	Swimming
10	2024	Summer	Chloë Farro	Swimming
10	2024	Summer	Mikel Schreuders	Swimming

== See also ==
- Aruba at the Olympics
- List of flag bearers for the Netherlands Antilles at the Olympics
