= Aruba at the Olympics =

- IOC code: ARU
- NOC: Aruban Olympic Committee
- Website: www.olympicaruba.com (in Papiamento)
- Medals: Gold 0 Silver 0 Bronze 0 Total 0

Summer appearances
- 1988; 1992; 1996; 2000; 2004; 2008; 2012; 2016; 2020; 2024; 2028

Other related appearances
- Netherlands Antilles (1952–2008)

Aruba first competed at the Olympic Games in 1988, and has participated in each Summer Olympic Games since then. Aruba has yet to win any Olympic medals, with its best performance being 8th place, achieved by Ethan Westera at the Men's iQFoil event in sailing at the 2024 Summer Olympics.

From 1952 until 1984, Aruban athletes competed as part of the Netherlands Antilles. This arrangement changed when Aruba became a separate entity ("land") of the Kingdom of the Netherlands in 1986. The Aruban Olympic Committee was formed in 1985 and recognized in 1986. As of 2026, Aruba had not competed in any Winter Olympic Games.

== Timeline of participation ==
Olympic Year/s	Teams		
1900–1952 W	Netherlands		
1952 S	Netherlands	Netherlands Antilles	
1956	Netherlands		
1960–1984	Netherlands	Netherlands Antilles	
1988–2008	Netherlands	Netherlands Antilles	Aruba
2012	Netherlands	as part of Netherlands / Independent Olympic Athletes	Aruba
2014–present	Netherlands		Aruba

== Medal tables ==
=== Medals by Summer Games ===
Games	Athletes	Gold	Silver	Bronze	Total	Rank
1952–1984	as part of the Netherlands Antilles					
1988 Seoul	8	0	0	0	0	–
1992 Barcelona	5	0	0	0	0	–
1996 Atlanta	3	0	0	0	0	–
2000 Sydney	4	0	0	0	0	–
2004 Athens	4	0	0	0	0	–
2008 Beijing	2	0	0	0	0	–
2012 London	4	0	0	0	0	–
2016 Rio de Janeiro	7	0	0	0	0	–
2020 Tokyo	3	0	0	0	0	–
2024 Paris	6	0	0	0	0	–
2028 Los Angeles	future event					
2032 Brisbane	future event					
Total		0	0	0	0	–

== Flagbearers ==
Summer Olympics
Games	Athlete	Sport
1988 Seoul	Bito Maduro	Judo
1992 Barcelona	Lucien Dirksz	Cycling
1996 Atlanta	Junior Faro	Weightlifting
2000 Sydney	Richard Rodriguez	Athletics
2004 Athens	Roshendra Vrolijk	Swimming
2008 Beijing	Fiderd Vis	Judo
2012 London	Jemal Le Grand	Swimming
2016 Rio de Janeiro	Nicole van der Velden	Sailing
2020 Tokyo	Allyson Ponson & Mikel Schreuders	Swimming
2024 Paris	Chloë Farro & Mikel Schreuders	Swimming

== See also ==
- Netherlands Antilles at the Olympics
