= Aruba at the 2016 Summer Olympics =

- IOC code: ARU
- NOC: Aruban Olympic Committee
- Website: www.olympicaruba.com (in Papiamento)

in Rio de Janeiro
- Competitors: 7 in 4 sports
- Flag bearer: Nicole van der Velden
- Medals: Gold 0 Silver 0 Bronze 0 Total 0

Summer Olympics appearances (overview)
- 1988; 1992; 1996; 2000; 2004; 2008; 2012; 2016; 2020; 2024; 2028

Other related appearances
- Netherlands Antilles (1952–2008)

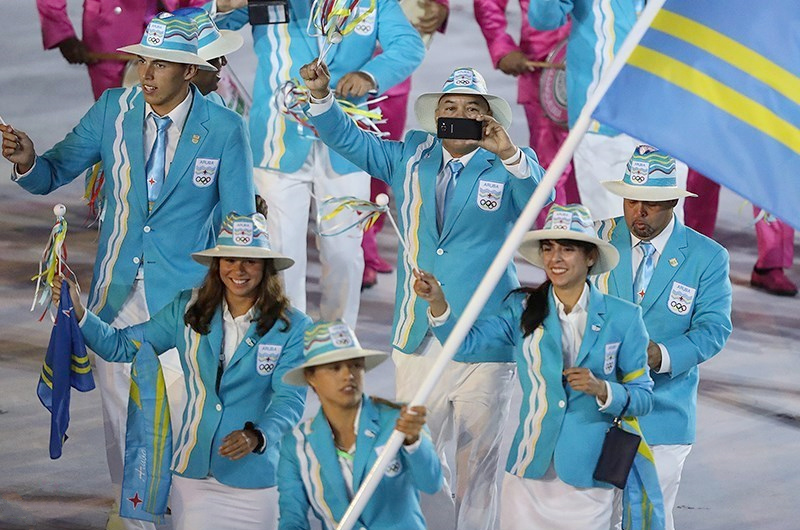
Sailor Nicole van der Velden led the Aruban team in the opening ceremony.

Aruba competed at the 2016 Summer Olympics in Rio de Janeiro, Brazil, from 5 to 21 August 2016. This was the nation's eighth consecutive appearance at the Summer Olympics.

Aruban Olympic Committee sent the nation's largest team to the Games since the 1988 Summer Olympics in Seoul. A total of seven athletes, three men and four women, were selected to compete in four different sports (judo, sailing, swimming, and taekwondo). Five of them made their Olympic debut at these Games, with Laser Radial sailor Philipine van Aanholt, who previously represented as a member of the Independent Olympic Athletes, and judoka Jayme Mata returning for their second appearance from London 2012. 2010 Youth Olympian Nicole van der Velden served as the nation's flag bearer in the opening ceremony.

Aruba, however, has never won a single Olympic medal.

== Judo ==
Aruba has qualified one judoka for the men's half-lightweight category (66 kg) at the Games. London 2012 Olympian Jayme Mata earned a continental quota spot from the Pan American region, as the highest-ranked Aruban judoka outside of direct qualifying position in the IJF World Ranking List of 30 May 2016.

| Athlete | Event | Round of 64 | Round of 32 | Round of 16 | Quarterfinals | Semifinals | Repechage | Final / BM | |
| Athlete | Event | Opposition Result | Opposition Result | Opposition Result | Opposition Result | Opposition Result | Opposition Result | Opposition Result | Rank |
|---|---|---|---|---|---|---|---|---|---|
| Jayme Mata | Men's −66 kg | Bye | Mahit (VAN); W 100–000 | Sobirov (UZB); L 000–100 | Did not advance | | | | |

== Sailing ==
Aruban sailors have qualified one boat in each of the following classes through the individual fleet World Championships and the 2015 Pan American Games, signifying the nation's return to the sport after a 24-year hiatus.

| Athlete | Event | Race | | | | | | | | | | | | | Net points | Final rank |
| Athlete | Event | 1 | 2 | 3 | 4 | 5 | 6 | 7 | 8 | 9 | 10 | 11 | 12 | M* | Net points | Final rank |
|---|---|---|---|---|---|---|---|---|---|---|---|---|---|---|---|---|
| Philipine van Aanholt | Women's Laser Radial | 24 | 21 | 18 | ~~32~~ | 27 | 27 | 21 | 19 | 24 | 26 | —N/a | | EL | 206 | 28 |
| Thijs Visser; Nicole van der Velden | Mixed Nacra 17 | 15 | 18 | 1 | 15 | 14 | 1 | ~~19~~ | 17 | 10 | 16 | 16 | 14 | EL | 135 | 16 |

M = Medal race; EL = Eliminated – did not advance into the medal race

== Swimming ==
Aruba has received a Universality invitation from FINA to send two swimmers (one male and one female) to the Olympics.

| Athlete | Event | Heat | | Semifinal | | Final | |
| Athlete | Event | Time | Rank | Time | Rank | Time | Rank |
|---|---|---|---|---|---|---|---|
| Mikel Schreuders | Men's 200 m freestyle | 1:55.10 | 45 | Did not advance | | | |
| Allyson Ponson | Women's 50 m freestyle | 26.00 | 45 | Did not advance | | | |

== Taekwondo ==
Aruba entered one athlete into the taekwondo competition for the first time at the Olympics. Monica Pimentel secured a spot in the women's flyweight category (49 kg) by virtue of her top two finish at the 2016 Pan American Qualification Tournament in Aguascalientes, Mexico.

| Athlete | Event | Round of 16 | Quarterfinals | Semifinals | Repechage | Final / BM | |
| Athlete | Event | Opposition Result | Opposition Result | Opposition Result | Opposition Result | Opposition Result | Rank |
|---|---|---|---|---|---|---|---|
| Monica Pimentel | Women's −49 kg | Aziez (FRA); L 1–2 | Did not advance | | | | |

== See also ==
- Aruba at the 2015 Pan American Games
