= Aruba at the 2020 Summer Olympics =

- IOC code: ARU
- NOC: Aruban Olympic Committee
- Website: www.olympicaruba.com (in Papiamento)

in Tokyo, Japan July 23, 2021 – August 8, 2021
- Competitors: 3 (2 men and 1 women) in 2 sports
- Flag bearers (opening): Allyson Ponson; Mikel Schreuders
- Flag bearer (closing): N/A
- Medals: Gold 0 Silver 0 Bronze 0 Total 0

Summer Olympics appearances (overview)
- 1988; 1992; 1996; 2000; 2004; 2008; 2012; 2016; 2020; 2024; 2028

Other related appearances
- Netherlands Antilles (1952–2008)

Aruba competed at the 2020 Summer Olympics in Tokyo. Originally scheduled to take place from 24 July to 9 August 2020, the Games were postponed to 23 July to 8 August 2021, because of the COVID-19 pandemic. It was the Aruba's eighth appearance at the Summer Olympics, since its debut at the 1988 Summer Olympics in Seoul. The Aruba delegation consisted of three athletes competing in two sports, and none of them won any medals at the Games.

== Background ==
The Aruban Olympic Committee was founded on 21 August 1985 and was recognized by the International Olympic Committee (IOC) on 17 October 1986 at the IOC session in Lausanne. The nation made its first Olympic appearance at the 1988 Summer Olympics in Seoul. Since then, it has competed in every Olympics. The 2020 Summer Olympics was the Aruba's eighth appearance at the Summer Olympics. It has not previously won any medal at the Summer Olympics.

The 2020 Summer Olympics was held in Tokyo, Japan, between 23 July and 8 August 2021. Originally scheduled to take place from 24 July to 9 August 2020, the Games were postponed due to the COVID-19 pandemic. For the first time, the International Olympic Committee invited each National Olympic Committee to select one female and one male athlete to jointly carry their flag during the opening ceremony. Swimmers Allyson Ponson and Mikel Schreuders were the country's flag bearers at the opening ceremony. Aruba did not win a medal at the Games.

== Competitors ==
The Aruban delegation consisted of three athletes.

Sport	Men	Women	Total
Shooting	1	0	1
Swimming	1	1	2
Total	2	1	3

== Shooting ==
As per the International Shooting Sport Federation (ISSF) guidelines, quota places for the 2020 Summer Olympics were allocated to the respective NOCs whose athletes achieved results at designated ISSF supervised events held from 1 September 2018 to 6 June 2021. The initial quota places were allocated only to the NOCs, who were then allowed to choose the individual shooters. After the initial quotas were allocated, shooters were granted entries to fill the remaining quota places based on the ISSF world rankings, and were awarded directly to the individual shooters and were not permitted to be changed by the NOCs. Aruba secured a spot in men's 10 m air pistol event, marking the territory's debut in the sport at the Summer Olympics.

The shooting events were held from 24 July to 2 August 2021 at the Asaka Shooting Range. In the qualification rounds of the men's pistol event, Philip Elhage was ranked 35th out of the 36 participants, and did not qualify for the final.

Athlete	Event	Qualification		Final	
Athlete	Event	Points	Rank	Points	Rank
Philip Elhage	Men's 10 m air pistol	556	35	Did not advance	

== Swimming ==
As per the Fédération internationale de natation (FINA) guidelines, a NOC was permitted to enter a maximum of two qualified athletes in each individual event, who have achieved the Olympic Qualifying Time (OQT). If the quota was not filled, one athlete per event was allowed to enter per NOC, provided they achieved the Olympic Selection Time (OST) in competitions approved by World Aquatics in the period between 1 March 2019 to 27 June 2021. If the overeall quota was not met, FINA allowed NOCs to enter one swimmer per gender under a universality place even if they have not achieved the standard entry times (OQT/OST). Aruba received a universality invitation from FINA to send two top-ranked swimmers (one per gender) in their respective individual events to the Olympics, based on the FINA points as on 28 June 2021.

The swimming events were held at the Tokyo Aquatics Centre. Allyson Ponson competed in the women's 50 metre freestyle and Mikel Schreuders competed in the men's 100 metre freestyle and men's 200 metre freestyle events, and neither advanced past the heats. This was the second consecutive Olympic appearance for both Ponson and Schreuders after their debut at the 2016 Summer Olympics.

Athlete	Event	Heat		Semifinal		Final	
Athlete	Event	Time	Rank	Time	Rank	Time	Rank
Mikel Schreuders	Men's 100 m freestyle	49.31	=30	Did not advance			
Mikel Schreuders	Men's 200 m freestyle	1:49.43	33	Did not advance			
Allyson Ponson	Women's 50 m freestyle	26.03	39	Did not advance			

== See also ==
- Aruba at the 2019 Pan American Games
