= Aruba at the 2024 Summer Olympics =

- IOC code: ARU
- NOC: Aruban Olympic Committee
- Website: olympicaruba.com

in Paris, France 26 July 2024 – 11 August 2024
- Competitors: 6 (4 men and 2 women) in 4 sports
- Flag bearers (opening): Mikel Schreuders & Chloë Farro
- Flag bearers (closing): Ethan Westera & Shanayah Howell
- Medals: Gold 0 Silver 0 Bronze 0 Total 0

Summer Olympics appearances (overview)
- 1988; 1992; 1996; 2000; 2004; 2008; 2012; 2016; 2020; 2024

Other related appearances
- Netherlands Antilles (1952–2008)

Aruba competed at the 2024 Summer Olympics in Paris, France. It was the nation's tenth appearance at the Summer Olympics since making its debut at the 1988 Summer Olympics in Seoul. The Aruban delegation consisted of six athletes competing in four sports. Aruba did not win any medals at the Games.

== Background ==
The Aruban Olympic Committee was established on 21 August 1985 and recognized by the International Olympic Committee (IOC) on 17 October 1986. Aruba first participated at the 1988 Summer Olympics in Seoul and has competed in every Summer Olympics since then. The 2024 Summer Olympics marked the nation's tenth appearance at the Games.

The 2024 Summer Olympics were held in Paris, France, from 26 July to 11 August 2024. Windsurfer Mikel Schreuders and Swimmer Chloë Farro served as Aruba’s flag bearers during the opening ceremony. Sailor Ethan Westera and cyclist Shanayah Howell served as Aruba’s flag bearers during the closing ceremony. Aruba did not win a medal during the Games.

== Competitors ==
The Aruban team consisted of six athletes competing in four sports, including athletics, swimming, sailing, and cycling.

Sport	Men	Women	Total
Cycling	0	1	1
Sailing	2	0	2
Shooting	1	0	1
Swimming	1	1	2
Total	4	2	6

== Cycling ==
A total of 48 BMX riders (24 per gender) quota places were available for the 2024 Summer Olympics. Each NOC could enter a maximum of three spots per gender. Host country France reserved one men's and women's quota place if unqualified, while a further spot was entitled to the eligible NOCs interested to have their BMX racers compete as granted by the universality principle. Aruba secured a single quota place in the women's BMX race through the allocations of universality spots.

This signified the nation's return to Olympic cycling for the first time since the 1996 Summer Olympics. The BMX competitions were held at on 1 and 2 August at the Vélodrome de Saint-Quentin-en-Yvelines at Montigny-le-Bretonneux. Howell was ranked 23rd amongst the 24 participants in the quarterfinal, did not progress to the next round.

Athlete	Event	Quarterfinal		Last chance qualifier		Semifinal		Final	
Athlete	Event	Points	Rank	Result	Rank	Points	Rank	Result	Rank
Shanayah Howell	Women's race	23	23	Did not advance					

== Sailing ==
The qualification period for the sailing event commenced at the 2023 Sailing World Championships in The Hague, Netherlands where about forty percent of the total quota was awarded to the top NOCs. Further quota places were allocated at the continental qualifier events and the Last Chance Regatta in 2024. Seven places were distributed to sailors representing the highest-finishing, not previously qualified NOCs at the 2024 ILCA World Championships. Aruba qualified two boats through the 2023 Pan American Games in Santiago, Chile, in the men's iQFoil and ILCA 7 classes.

Ethan Westera represented Aruba in the men's iQFoil event. He is the country's first windsurfer since Roger Jurriens at the 1992 Summer Olympics. He had won a silver medal at the Pan American Games, after coming back from an injury in 2022.

Just van Aanholt competed in the men's ILCA 7 event. He was born in Curaçao, and comes from a sailing family. His father, Cor van Aanholt, competed at the 2000 Summer Olympics, while his sister Philipine van Aanholt represented Aruba at multiple Olympic Games. He won a bronze medal in the 2010 Summer Youth Olympics representing the Netherlands Antilles.

The sailing events were held off the coast of Marseille. The iQFoil competitions took place from 28 July to 3 August. As per the schedule, the competitors were to contest an opening series of 18 races before the top-ranked sailors advanced to the elimination rounds. However, due to poor weather conditions, the last five races were cancelled. Westera finished ninth in the opening series with 90 net points to qualify for the quarterfinals. He placed fifth in the quarterfinal and did not progress further.

The ILCA 7 races were held from 1 to 7 August. Sailors were to compete in an opening series of ten races, with only the top ten progressing to the medal race. However, only eight races were held, and Van Aanholt accumulated 178 net points during the opening series and finished 33rd overall, failing to advance to the medal race.

Athlete	Event	Opening series																						Quarterfinal	Semifinal								Final							
Athlete	Event	1	2	3	4	5	6	7	8	9	10	11	12	13	14	15	16	17	18	19	20	Net points	Rank	Rank	1	2	3	4	5	6	Total	Rank	1	2	3	4	5	6	Total	Rank
Ethan Westera	Men's IQFoil	11	12	12	~~17~~	10	~~13~~	8	11	3	6	8	2	7	Cancelled							90	9 Q	5	Did not advance															8

Athlete	Event	Race													Net points	Final rank
Athlete	Event	1	2	3	4	5	6	7	8	9	10	11	12	M*	Net points	Final rank
Just van Aanholt	Men's ILCA 7	26	~~39~~	25	24	34	10	23	36	Cancelled		—N/a		EL	178	33

M = Medal race; EL = Eliminated – did not advance into the medal race

== Shooting ==
As per the International Shooting Sport Federation (ISSF) guidelines, quota places for the Games were allocated to the NOCs based on the results at designated ISSF supervised events held from 14 August 2022 to 9 June 2024. Initial quota places were allocated only to the NOCs, who were allowed to choose the individual shooters. After the initial quotas were allocated, shooters were granted entries based on the ISSF world rankings, which were awarded directly to the individual shooters and were not to be changed by the NOCs. Aruba received one universality quota place in the men's 10 metres air pistol event.

Philip Elhage represented Aruba in the men's 10 metre air pistol event. Born in Curacao, this was the third Olympic participation for El Hage. He represented Netherlands Antilles in the 2008 Summer Olympics, and competed for Aruba at the 2020 Summer Olympics in Tokyo, becoming the country's first shooter to participate in the Olympics.

The shooting competitions were held at the National Shooting Centre in Châteauroux from 27 July to 5 August. The men's 10 metre air pistol qualification event took place on 27 July, with the top eight shooters advancing to the final. El Hage scored 554 points in qualification and finished 33rd and last overall, failing to progress to the final round.

Athlete	Event	Qualification		Final	
Athlete	Event	Points	Rank	Points	Rank
Philip Elhage	Men's 10 m air pistol	554	33	Did not advance	

== Swimming ==
As per the World Aquatics guidelines, a NOC was permitted to enter a maximum of two qualified athletes in each individual event, who have achieved the Olympic Qualifying Time. One athlete per event will be allowed to enter if they meet the Olympic Selection Time if the quota is not filled. NOCs were allowed to enter swimmers (one per gender) under a universality place even if no one achieved the standard entry times. Aruba was awarded two universality quota places in swimming.

The swimming events were held at the Paris La Défense Arena at Nanterre. Mikel Schreuders competed in the men's 50 m and 100 m freestyle events while and Chloë Farro competed in the women's 50 m freestyle. Schreuders was competing in his third Olympics, and this was the debut Olympic appearance for Farro. Schreuders had won a silver and bronze medal in the 2018 Central American and Caribbean Games. Neither of the swimmers advanced past the heats.

Athlete	Event	Heat		Semifinal		Final	
Athlete	Event	Time	Rank	Time	Rank	Time	Rank
Mikel Schreuders	Men's 50 m freestyle	22.14	26	Did not advance			
Mikel Schreuders	Men's 100 m freestyle	48.84	26	Did not advance			
Chloë Farro	Women's 50 m freestyle	26.49	32	Did not advance			

== See also ==
- Aruba at the 2023 Pan American Games
