= Sports in Aruba =

Aruba is an island in the Caribbean that hosts many sports events to fuel its economy.

An increase in tourism revenue has led to an investment in athletic activities, notably recreational sports such as basketball, soccer, and more island-specific pastimes such as kite surfing and spearfishing. Aruba has a soccer team that competes internationally, and many athletes from Aruba have participated in professional leagues.

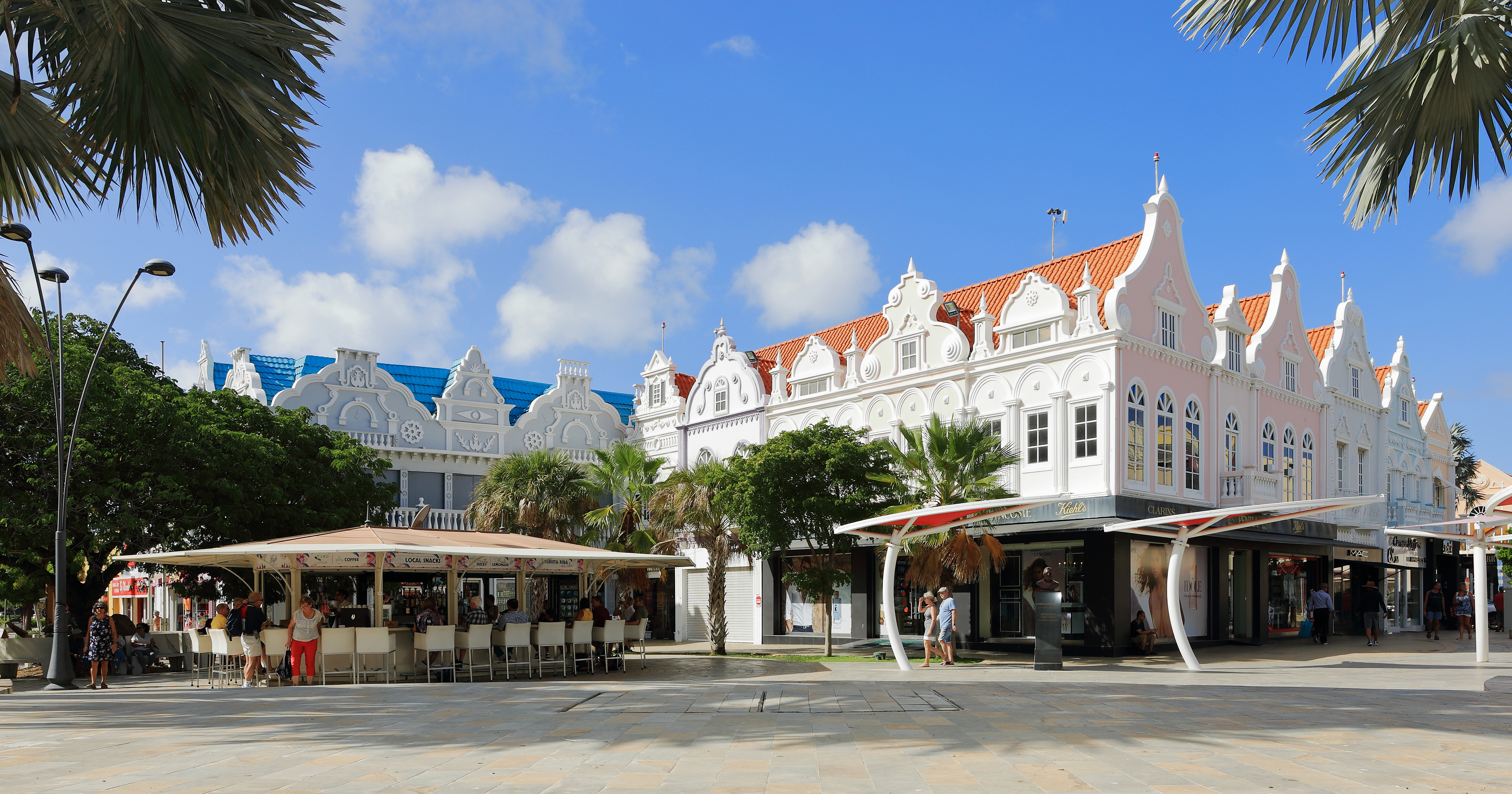
The Plaza Daniel Leo, located in Oranjestad, is home to Aruba's many stadiums. It is named after Daniel Leo, a local politician.

== Recreational sports ==
Due to an increase in tourism revenue, Aruba has been able to invest into sports programs and events. Aruba has a recreational basketball team and its citizens are competitive in baseball and soccer. Fishing and kite surfing industries have also increased in recent years.

== Basketball ==
Aruba's recreational basketball program consists of 16 teams, involving more than 200 players from the ages of 12 to 18. Basketball clubs have also contributed to the development of sports teams on the island. One of the program's main objectives is for one of their athletes to win an academic scholarship to play in the United States. Aruba is also making efforts to certify one of their referees for international FIBA events.

== Baseball ==
Baseball is one of the most popular sports on the island, with a number of Aruban citizens having gone to the United States to play professionally. The first Major League Baseball player from Aruba was Eugene Kingsale who played for a number of professional baseball teams from 1996 to 2003.

The Aruba Little League is another baseball team on the island. It was created in 1958 and has grown in popularity since. The San Nicolaas little league team won the 2010 Senior League World Series.

== Kite boarding ==
The conditions in Aruba are perfectly suited for kite boarding year-round. The island has favorable wind speeds, averaging around 18.5 miles per hour daily. Because the warm air in Aruba has a lower density than average, surfers can use smaller kites than would be needed in other locations. Aruba hosts many global kite boarding tournaments, and the kite boarding industry is one of the largest sources of income for the island.

== Diving ==
Across Aruba there are various diving spots with a few diving locations. The island has several airplane wrecks, and the wreck of the SS Antilla (1939) is one of the largest dive-able wrecks in the Caribbean.

== Football ==
The men's Aruba national football team was founded in 1932, and participated in their first international match on April 6, 1924. However, they have had very little success in their international career. The team's most recent FIFA rank is 203, which is their lowest rank in history, while their highest FIFA rank was 50 in 1924. The team's home stadium is the Guillermo Prospero Trinidad Stadium, a multi-purpose stadium located in Oranjestad, Aruba. The stadium was originally named after the former Dutch queen Wilhelmina but was changed to Guillermo Prospero Trinidad Stadium in 1994.

The women's Aruba national team competed in their first international match in 2006. Their current head coach is Mildred Wever. Unlike the men's team, they have not qualified for a World Cup. Their current FIFA ranking is 153, their lowest FIFA ranking was 158, and their highest FIFA ranking was 92. Both teams are a part of an association named the Aruba Football Federation, and both of the teams are members of the CONCACAF.

== Olympics ==
Prior to 1986, athletes from Aruba competed in the Olympics representing the Netherlands, but as of 1986, Aruba now fields their own athletes. Aruba has competed in nine Summer Olympic Games, but has yet to win any medals. A notable Olympian, Miguel Janssen, currently holds the country's record in most long-distance running events. He participated in the 1996 Summer Olympics, as well as in six different world championships for Aruba. Aruba has yet to participate in any Winter Olympic Games.

== Local sports facilities ==
The Don Elias Mansur Ballpark is a multi-use stadium that is used mainly for baseball games. The Guillermo Prospero Trinidad Stadium is another multi-use stadium. It is used by the national soccer teams, and the track and field teams. The Tierra Del Sol Resort, Spa and Country Club is the only 18-hole golf course in Aruba.

== Professional athletes from Aruba ==
- Xander Bogaerts
- Radhames Dykhoff
- Gene Kingsale
- Calvin Maduro
- Sidney Ponson
- Richard Rodriguez (athlete)
- Chadwick Tromp
