= Aruba at the 2004 Summer Olympics =

- IOC code: ARU
- NOC: Aruban Olympic Committee
- Website: www.olympicaruba.com (in Papiamento)

in Athens
- Competitors: 4 in 3 sports
- Flag bearer: Roshendra Vrolijk
- Medals: Gold 0 Silver 0 Bronze 0 Total 0

Summer Olympics appearances (overview)
- 1988; 1992; 1996; 2000; 2004; 2008; 2012; 2016; 2020; 2024; 2028

Other related appearances
- Netherlands Antilles (1952–2008)

Aruba sent a delegation to compete at the 2004 Summer Olympics in Athens, Greece from 13 to 29 August 2004. The delegation's participation in the Athens Olympics marked Aruba's fifth appearance at the Summer Olympics since the Dutch colony's debut at the 1988 Summer Olympics in Seoul, South Korea. Four athletes (three men and one woman) competed across three sports (Pierre de Windt in track and field, Davy Bisslik and Roshendra Vrolijk in swimming, and Isnardo Faro weightlifting). None of the track or swimming athletes advanced past the first round in their events, and as of Athens, no Arubans had medaled in any events. Roshendra Vrolijk bore Aruba's flag at the ceremonies.

== Background ==
Aruba is a small island colony of 100,000 people that is part of the Kingdom of the Netherlands, and has been under Dutch control since the 1630s. The island lies in the southern Caribbean Sea just to north of Venezuela, and is near to the Dutch colonies of Curaçao and Bonaire. The colony originally was part of an autonomous union with those two islands in what was known as the Netherlands Antilles, but Aruba seceded from that union in 1986. The Netherlands continues to regulate all its foreign affairs. While the first Dutch Antilean delegation to the Olympics was sent during the 1952 Summer Olympics in Helsinki, Finland, the first uniquely Aruban delegation participated two years after the island's secession from the Netherlands Antilles at the 1988 Summer Olympics in Seoul, South Korea. Between then and the 2004 Athens Olympics, Aruba had sent a delegation to all five Summer Olympic games. The most substantial Aruban delegation was in 1988, when it included eight athletes. This delegation included more women and encompassed more sports than any Aruban delegation since then (including the Athens Olympics).

At the Athens Olympics, four athletes (three men and one woman) participated across three sports in four distinct events. Swimmer Roshendra Vrolijk was Aruba's flag bearer at the ceremonies.

== Athletics ==
Aruban athletes have so far achieved qualifying standards in the following athletics events (up to a maximum of 3 athletes in each event at the 'A' Standard, and 1 at the 'B' Standard).

Pierre "Peppie" de Windt participated on Aruba's behalf as its only athlete in a track and field event. Born in the Solito neighborhood of Aruba's capital city, Oranjestad, de Windt was 21 at the time he ran at the Olympics in Athens. The Aruban athlete had not previously participated in any Olympic games. The event's first round took place during the 21st of August. de Windt took part in the fourth heat against eight other athletes, although Greece's Hristoforos Hoidis did not start. In his heat, de Windt placed sixth with a time of 11.02 seconds. Paraguay's Diego Ferreira ranked fifth ahead of de Windt, setting a national record in the process (10.50 seconds), while Laotian athlete Chamleunesouk Ao Oudomphonh ranked directly behind de Windt (11.30 seconds). The leaders of de Windt's heat included first place finalist Shawn Crawford of the United States (10.02 seconds) and Barbados' Obadele Thompson, who placed second and set his season best (10.08 seconds). The Aruban sprinter did not advance to later rounds.

Key

- Note–Ranks given for track events are within the athlete's heat only
- Q = Qualified for the next round
- q = Qualified for the next round as a fastest loser or, in field events, by position without achieving the qualifying target
- NR = National record
- N/A = Round not applicable for the event
- Bye = Athlete not required to compete in round

Athlete	Event	Heat		Quarterfinal		Semifinal		Final	
Athlete	Event	Result	Rank	Result	Rank	Result	Rank	Result	Rank
Pierre de Windt	Men's 100 m	11.02	6	Did not advance					

== Swimming ==
The Athens Olympic Aquatic Centre, where Bisslik and Vrolijk participated in their events

Davy Bisslik represented Aruba as a swimmer in the men's 100 meters butterfly, and was the only male Aruban athlete participating in swimming that year. Born in Aruba, Bisslik participated in the athletic programs at The College of New Jersey, and attended the 2000 Sydney Olympics on Aruba's behalf in the men's 50 meters freestyle, where he ranked 62nd during the qualification round. Bisslik returned to the Olympics at age 22, although he entered in a different event entirely. During the qualification round on August 19, Bisslik competed against seven other athletes. He finished the event in 57.85 seconds, ranking last in his heat behind Guam's Daniel O'Keeffe (57.39 seconds), who placed seventh, and Indonesia's Andy Wibowo (56.86 seconds) who placed sixth. His heat was led by Czech swimmer Michal Rubáček (54.87 seconds) and Uzbekistan's Oleg Lyashko (55.90 seconds). Of the 59 participants in the qualification round, Bisslik ranked 56th. He did not advance to later heats.

Roshendra Vrolijk represented Aruba at the Athens Olympics as a swimmer participating in the women's 50 meters freestyle. Born in Aruba, Vrolijk was 15 years old when she participated in the 50 meters freestyle at the 2000 Summer Olympics in Sydney, where she ranked 62nd in the qualification round. She returned to the Olympics as a 19-year-old. During the qualification round of the event, which took place on August 20, Vrolijk participated in the fourth heat against seven other athletes. She completed the event in 28.43 seconds, placing third in the event between Moldova's Maria Tregubova (28.40 seconds) and Zambia's Jakie Wellman (28.56 seconds). Of the 73 finishing athletes, Vrolijk ranked 49th. She did not advance to later rounds.

Athlete	Event	Heat		Semifinal		Final	
Athlete	Event	Time	Rank	Time	Rank	Time	Rank
Davy Bisslik	Men's 100 m butterfly	57.85	56	Did not advance			
Roshendra Vrolijk	Women's 50 m freestyle	28.43	49	Did not advance			

== Weightlifting ==
Isnardo "Junior" Faro participated in the 2004 Athens Olympics as Aruba's only weightlifter. Born in Aruba in July 1978, Faro was 18 at the time he represented Aruba at the 1996 Atlanta Olympics, where he finished in 21st place of the men's middleweight class. Although Faro did not attend the 2000 Sydney Olympics, he returned to the Olympics in 2004 as a 26-year-old in the men's middle-heavyweight class. During the event, which took place on August 23, Faro participated alongside 24 other athletes. During the snatch phrase of the event, Faro was given three opportunities to score. During the first attempt, Faro successfully lifted 132.5 kilograms; on the next, 137 kilograms; and on the final, 140 kilograms. During the next phase, clean and jerk, Faro was given another three opportunities. On his first try, Faro attempted and failed to lift 167.5 kilograms. He succeeded in lifting this quantity on his next try. During his final attempt, Faro attempted and failed to lift 175 kilograms. Thus, as his scores were 140 and 167.5, the Aruban athlete's final score was 307.5. 19 people of the 25 initial participants finished the event, and Isnardo Faro ranked 19th. He ranked behind 18th place finalist Furkat Saidov of Uzbekistan (320 points) and 17th place finalist Dario Lecman of Argentina (340 points). The gold medalist was Bulgaria's Milen Dobrev (407.5 points).

Athlete	Event	Snatch		Clean & Jerk		Total	Rank
Athlete	Event	Result	Rank	Result	Rank	Total	Rank
Isnardo Faro	Men's −94 kg	140	22	167.5	19	307.5	19

== See also ==
- Aruba at the 2003 Pan American Games
