= Aruba at the 2000 Summer Olympics =

- IOC code: ARU
- NOC: Aruban Olympic Committee
- Website: www.olympicaruba.com (in Papiamento)

in Sydney
- Competitors: 5 (3 men and 2 women) in 3 sports
- Flag bearer: Richard Rodriguez
- Medals: Gold 0 Silver 0 Bronze 0 Total 0

Summer Olympics appearances (overview)
- 1988; 1992; 1996; 2000; 2004; 2008; 2012; 2016; 2020; 2024

Other related appearances
- Netherlands Antilles (1952–2008)

Aruba was represented at the 2000 Summer Olympics in Sydney, New South Wales, Australia by the Aruban Olympic Committee. It was the nation's fourth appearance at the Olympics, after debuting in 1988.

In total, five athletes including three men and two women represented Aruba in three different sports including athletics, judo and swimming.

== Competitors ==
In total, five athletes represented Aruba at the 2000 Summer Olympics in Sydney, New South Wales, Australia across three different sports.

Sport	Men	Women	Total
Athletics	1	1	2
Judo	1	0	1
Swimming	1	1	2
Total	3	2	5

== Athletics ==
In total, two Aruban athletes participated in the athletics events – Luz Marina Geerman in the women's 100 m and Richard Rodriguez in the men's marathon.

The heats for the women's 100 m took place on 22 September 2000. Geerman finished eighth in her heat in a time of 12.96 seconds. She did not advance to the quarter-finals. Geerman was just 16 years old when she competed. She ran in heat 3 and, with a finishing time of 12.96 seconds, finished 8th in her heat and overall 76th out of 84 starters. Before the 2000 Games, Geerman's personal best time was 12.2 seconds; coached by Eric Pieternella, her aim for the Games had been to run under 11.9 seconds.

The men's marathon took place on 1 October 2000. Rodriguez did not finish.

Athlete	Event	Heat		Quarterfinal		Semifinal		Final	
Athlete	Event	Result	Rank	Result	Rank	Result	Rank	Result	Rank
Luz Marina Geerman	Women's 100 m	12.96	76	Did not advance					
Richard Rodriguez	Men's marathon	—						DNF	

== Judo ==
In total, one Aruban athlete participated in the judo events – Javier Wanga in the men's −66 kg.

The men's −66 kg category took place on 17 September 2000. Wanga lost his first round match by ippon to Andrew Collett of Australia.

Athlete	Event	Preliminary	Round of 32	Round of 16	Quarterfinals	Semifinals	Repechage 1	Repechage 2	Repechage 3	Final / BM	
Athlete	Event	Opposition Result	Opposition Result	Opposition Result	Opposition Result	Opposition Result	Opposition Result	Opposition Result	Opposition Result	Opposition Result	Rank
Javier Wanga	−66 kg	Andrew Collett (AUS); L DQ	did not advance								

== Swimming ==
In total, two Aruban athletes participated in the swimming events – Davy Bisslik in the men's 50 m freestyle and Roshendra Vrolijk in the women's 50 m freestyle.

The heats for the men's 50 m freestyle took place on 21 September 2000. Bisslik finished second in his heat in a time of 25.57 seconds which was ultimately not fast enough to advance to the semi-finals.

The heats for the women's 50 m freestyle took place on 22 September 2000. Vrolijk finished sixth in her heat in a time of 29.31 seconds which was ultimately not fast enough to advance to the semi-finals.

Athlete	Event	Heat		Semifinal		Final	
Athlete	Event	Time	Rank	Time	Rank	Time	Rank
Davy Bisslik	Men's 50 m freestyle	25.57	62	Did not advance			
Roshendra Vrolijk	Women's 50 m freestyle	29.31	62	Did not advance			

== See also ==
- Aruba at the 1999 Pan American Games
