= Aruba at the 2012 Summer Olympics =

- IOC code: ARU
- NOC: Aruban Olympic Committee
- Website: www.olympicaruba.com (in Papiamento)

in London
- Competitors: 4 in 3 sports
- Flag bearers: Jemal Le Grand (opening); Jayme Mata (closing)
- Medals: Gold 0 Silver 0 Bronze 0 Total 0

Summer Olympics appearances (overview)
- 1988; 1992; 1996; 2000; 2004; 2008; 2012; 2016; 2020; 2024

Other related appearances
- Netherlands Antilles (1952–2008)

The Caribbean island nation of Aruba competed at the 2012 Summer Olympics in London, United Kingdom from 27 July – 12 August 2012. This was the nation's seventh Olympiad as an independent nation.

Four Aruban athletes were selected to the team, competing at their first Games, only in judo, swimming, and weightlifting; all of them participated under Universality places and tripartite invitation, without having qualified. Aruba, however, has never won an Olympic medal.

== Judo ==
Aruba has had 1 judoka invited.

Athlete	Event	Round of 64	Round of 32	Round of 16	Quarterfinals	Semifinals	Repechage	Final / BM	
Athlete	Event	Opposition Result	Opposition Result	Opposition Result	Opposition Result	Opposition Result	Opposition Result	Opposition Result	Rank
Jayme Mata	Men's −66 kg	Bye	Uriarte (ESP); L 0000–0100	did not advance					

== Swimming ==
Men

Athlete	Event	Heat		Semifinal		Final	
Athlete	Event	Time	Rank	Time	Rank	Time	Rank
Jemal Le Grand	100 m freestyle	51.86	40	did not advance			

Women

Athlete	Event	Heat		Final	
Athlete	Event	Time	Rank	Time	Rank
Danielle van den Berg	800 m freestyle	9:23.21	34	did not advance	

== Weightlifting ==
Men

Athlete	Event	Snatch		Clean & Jerk		Total	Rank
Athlete	Event	Result	Rank	Result	Rank	Total	Rank
Carl Henriquez	+105 kg	122	19	160	18	282	18
