= Aruba at the 1992 Summer Olympics =

- IOC code: ARU
- NOC: Aruban Olympic Committee

in Barcelona
- Competitors: 5 (4 men and 1 woman) in 3 sports
- Flag bearer: Lucien Dirksz
- Medals: Gold 0 Silver 0 Bronze 0 Total 0

Summer Olympics appearances (overview)
- 1988; 1992; 1996; 2000; 2004; 2008; 2012; 2016; 2020; 2024

Other related appearances
- Netherlands Antilles (1952–2008)

Aruba sent a delegation to compete at the 1992 Summer Olympics in Barcelona, Spain from 25 July to 9 August 1992. This was Aruba's second appearance at a Summer Olympic Games since separating from the Netherlands Antilles. The Aruban delegation consisted of five competitors, track and field athletes Kim Reynierse and Cornelia Melis, sailor Roger Jurriens, and cyclists Lucien Dirksz and Gerard van Vliet. Reynierse came 53rd men's marathon, Jurriens finished 37th in the Lechner A-390, and all other Arubans failed to finish their events.

== Background ==
The Aruban Olympic Committee was recognised by the International Olympic Committee on 1 January 1986. Aruba made its Olympic debut as a distinct territory soon after, at the 1988 Seoul Olympics, and they have participated in every Summer Olympic Games since. The 1992 Summer Olympics were held in Barcelona, Spain, from 25 July to 9 August 1992; 9,356 athletes took part representing 197 National Olympic Committees. Barcelona was Aruba's second time participating in the Summer Olympics. The Aruban delegation to these Olympics consisted of five competitors, track and field athletes Kim Reynierse and Cornelia Melis, sailor Roger Jurriens, and cyclists Lucien Dirksz and Gerard van Vliet. Dirksz was chosen as the flag-bearer for the opening ceremony.

== Competitors ==
The following is the list of number of competitors in the Games.

Sport	Men	Women	Total
Athletics	1	1	2
Cycling	2	0	2
Sailing	1	0	1
Total	4	1	5

== Athletics ==
Men
Track & road events

Kim Reynierse was 31 years old at the time of the Barcelona Olympics, and was making his first and only Olympic appearance. On 9 August, he took part in the men's marathon. He finished the race in 2:25.31, 53rd out of the 87 who finished the race. The gold medal was won by Hwang Young-cho of South Korea in 2:13:23, the silver medal was earned by Kōichi Morishita of Japan, and the bronze was won by Stephan Freigang of Germany.

Athlete	Event	Heat		Quarterfinal		Semifinal		Final	
Athlete	Event	Result	Rank	Result	Rank	Result	Rank	Result	Rank
Kim Reynierse	Marathon	—						2:25.31	53

Women
Track & road events

Cornelia Melis was 32 years old at the time of the Barcelona Olympics, and was making her second and final Olympic appearance. On 1 August, she took part in the women's marathon. She failed to finish the race along with nine others. The gold medal was won by Valentina Yegorova of the Unified Team in 2:32:41, the silver medal was earned by Yuko Arimori of Japan, and the bronze was won by Lorraine Moller of New Zealand.

Athlete	Event	Heat		Quarterfinal		Semifinal		Final	
Athlete	Event	Result	Rank	Result	Rank	Result	Rank	Result	Rank
Cornelia Melis	Marathon	—						DNF	

== Cycling ==
Two male cyclists represented Aruba in 1992.

=== Road ===
Athlete	Event	Time	Rank
Lucien Dirksz	Men's road race	DNF	
Gerard van Vliet	Men's road race	DNF	

== Sailing ==
Men

Athlete	Event	Race										Net points	Final rank
Athlete	Event	1	2	3	4	5	6	7	8	9	10	Net points	Final rank
Roger Jurriens	Lechner A-390	35	32	34	30	33	35	34	~~38~~	33	38	358.0	37

== See also ==
- Aruba at the 1991 Pan American Games
