= 2023 Sailing World Championships – Men's iQFoil =

Men's iQFoil at the 2023 Sailing World Championships
- Venue: The Hague, the Netherlands
- Dates: 14–20 August
- Competitors: 93 from 43 nations

Medalists
gold medal	Luuc van Opzeeland	Netherlands
silver medal	Sebastian Kördel	Germany
bronze medal	Nicolò Renna	Italy

The men's iQFoil competition at the 2023 Sailing World Championships was the men's windsurfer event and was held in The Hague, the Netherlands, 14–20 August 2023. The entries were limited to 100 boards. The competitors participated in an opening series that was planned to 20 races, followed by a medal series. The medal series was planned for 19 August.

The competition served as a qualifying event for the 2024 Olympic sailing competition with 11 out of 24 national quota being distributed at the event.

== Summary ==
Sebastian Kördel of Germany was the reigning world champion, having won the 2022 iQFoil World Championships in Brest, France, while Nicolas Goyard of France had won the Paris 2024 Test Event the month before. In the Sailing World Cup, Sam Sills of Great Britain had won the Trofeo Princesa Sofía, Fabien Pianazza of France (not present) had won the Semaine Olympique Française, Luuc van Opzeeland of the Netherlands had won the Allianz Regatta, and Kördel had won the Kiel Week.

Kördel and van Opzeeland took the lead after the first day of racing. After them, Goyard had three third place finishes. No wind limited the possibility to sail on 18 August.

From the opening series results, Nicolò Renna of Italy qualified directly to the final, while Kördel and van Opzeeland made it to the semi-final. van Opzeeland won the championship title by winning the medal series, ahead of Kördel, with Renna to receive the bronze medal.

With the final results, national quotas were awarded by the Netherlands, Germany, Italy, Great Britain, Israel, New Zealand, Australia, Spain, Poland, Brazil and Switzerland.

== Results ==
=== Opening series ===
Results of individual races
Pos	Helmsman	Country	I	II	III	IV	V	VI	VII	VIII	IX	X	XI	XII	XIII	XIV	Tot	Pts
1	Nicolò Renna	Italy	15^{†}	3	3	5	9^{†}	5	1	1	1	1	11^{†}	4	3	1	63	28
2	Sebastian Kördel	Germany	RDG 9.3	3	1	1	4	31^{†}	27^{†}	1	1	3	6	3	19^{†}	7	116.3	39.3
3	Luuc van Opzeeland	Netherlands	1	5	1	3	6^{†}	1	3	21^{†}	5	2	12^{†}	6	9	4	79	40
4	Grae Morris	Australia	23^{†}	1	DNF 51^{†}	3	5	9	11	1	7	6	5	1	30^{†}	2	155	51
5	Yoav Omer	Israel	5	11^{†}	1	13^{†}	2	9	5	7	5	31^{†}	13	13	13	5	133	78
6	Louis Pignolet	France	11	3	11	13^{†}	12^{†}	1	7	5	9	7	16	19^{†}	8	3	125	81
7	Thomas Goyard	France	3	9	3	3	8	7	7	11^{†}	BFD 51^{†}	5	1	DNF 48^{†}	2	34	192	82
8	Josh Armit	New Zealand	7	19^{†}	9	31^{†}	6	9	7	3	3	16	17^{†}	2	17	10	156	89
9	Luca Di Tomassi	Italy	BFD 51^{†}	7	5	9	29^{†}	7	9	9	3	11	26	5	33^{†}	6	210	97
10	Sam Sills	Great Britain	9	1	17	29^{†}	5	15	13	19^{†}	7	10	9	11	7	31^{†}	183	104
11	Nacho Baltasar	Spain	1	27^{†}	1	9	1	11^{†}	9	3	7	22	44^{†}	31	6	17	189	107
12	Clément Bourgeois	France	7	7	13	21	1	41^{†}	1	33^{†}	1	4	20	41^{†}	22	14	226	111
13	Paweł Tarnowski	Poland	1	7	35^{†}	9	24^{†}	3	13	3	9	13	8	22	34^{†}	24	205	112
14	Radosław Furmański	Poland	9	9	15^{†}	7	12	13^{†}	7	13	5	26	27^{†}	9	4	15	171	116
15	Nicolas Goyard	France	9	27	5	5	31^{†}	1	3	31^{†}	5	20	3	42^{†}	1	38	221	117
16	Mateus Isaac	Brazil	7	BFD 51^{†}	7	17^{†}	7	7	9	7	3	19	31	12	32^{†}	13	222	122
17	Tom Reuveny	Israel	1	1	31^{†}	11^{†}	10	11	3	3	1	24	39	15	15	UFD 48^{†}	213	123
18	Finn Hawkins	Great Britain	35^{†}	13	DNF 51^{†}	21	10	15	3	11	21	8	10	8	21	41^{†}	268	141
19	Adrien Mestre	France	3	7	5	11	22	11	DNC 51^{†}	7	23^{†}	39	14	16	11	DSQ 48^{†}	268	146
20	Yoav Cohen	Israel	13	5	3	7	23	9	41^{†}	27^{†}	11	12	29^{†}	24	23	19	246	149
21	Elia Colombo	Switzerland	5	DNC 51^{†}	3	13	20	5	9	7	BFD 51^{†}	23	4	DSQ 48^{†}	14	UFD 48	301	151
22	Max Castelein	Netherlands	13	21	9	11	14	27^{†}	33^{†}	17	11	15	7	33^{†}	25	12	248	155
23	Bi Kun	China	11	3	11	1	7	21	25^{†}	1	BFD 51^{†}	41^{†}	23	35	5	37	272	155
24	Ethan Westera	Aruba	3	BFD 51^{†}	29	7	19	11	15	19	BFD 51^{†}	32^{†}	2	20	16	16	291	157
25	Johan Søe	Denmark	17	13	DNC 51^{†}	17	17	17	1	37^{†}	11	9	35^{†}	10	35	11	281	158
26	Andy Brown	Great Britain	33^{†}	5	7	5	19^{†}	7	11	15	3	21	15	43	44^{†}	26	254	158
27	Onur Cavit Biriz	Turkey	7	13	21^{†}	15	21	15	31^{†}	15	7	42^{†}	21	14	18	28	268	174
28	Michal Polák	Poland	11	21	25	17	4	39^{†}	21	19	BFD 51^{†}	33^{†}	22	7	10	18	298	175
29	Rytis Jasiūnas	Lithuania	5	1	19	41^{†}	20	21	37^{†}	5	29	37^{†}	19	26	31	8	299	184
30	Joost Vink	Netherlands	15	13	7	11	8	13	11	21^{†}	17^{†}	40^{†}	32	17	26	32	263	185
31	Huig Jan Tak	Netherlands	29	11	DNF 51^{†}	1	14	35^{†}	1	35	25	18	18	28^{†}	28	9	303	189
32	Endre Funnemark	Norway	19	5	29^{†}	3	3	13	29^{†}	9	17	25	36	40^{†}	40	21	289	191
33	Mathew Barton	Great Britain	19	39^{†}	23	7	37^{†}	3	5	13	15	30	33	18	42^{†}	25	309	191
34	Elijah Liefting	New Zealand	BFD 51^{†}	11	27^{†}	15	17	19	21	9	13	27	38^{†}	23	27	30	328	212
35	Thomas Crook	New Zealand	15	9	21	BFD 51^{†}	18	RDG 22.7	35^{†}	17	11	28	45^{†}	39	12	20	343.7	212.7
36	Harry Joyner	Australia	27^{†}	11	27	5	15	37^{†}	17	21	13	17	28	29	41^{†}	36	324	219
37	Tomer Vardimon	Israel	23^{†}	19	13	9	16	23^{†}	21	9	15	29	25	38	29	39^{†}	308	223
38	Fabian Wolf	Germany	15	9	9	15	18	19	13	39^{†}	33^{†}	34	24	32	DNF 48^{†}	40	348	228
39	Lee Tae-hoon	South Korea	9	23^{†}	21^{†}	19	16	5	19	15	17	38	40^{†}	27	38	29	316	232
40	Huang Jingye	China	31^{†}	21	15	21	11	25	17	13	35^{†}	35	37^{†}	21	20	33	335	232
41	Juozas Bernotas	Lithuania	17	15	37^{†}	31^{†}	13	17	19	23	13	44^{†}	30	30	39	22	350	238
42	Jakob Eklund	Finland	17	39^{†}	17	BFD 51^{†}	13	17	17	21	19	36^{†}	34	25	36	23	365	239
43	Yang Minhai	China	35^{†}	BFD 51^{†}	11	29	26	3	5	19	21	43^{†}	42	36	24	27	372	243
44	Dāvis Mazais	Latvia	31^{†}	17	5	19	11	23	23	17	25^{†}	46^{†}	41	34	37	42	371	269
45	Kensei Ikeda	Japan	13	15	19	27^{†}	36^{†}	13	25	15	19	45^{†}	43	37	43	35	385	277
46	Kiran Badloe	Netherlands	39^{†}	25	9	35	3	3	37	39^{†}	9	14	DNC 48^{†}	DNF 48	DNC 48	DNC 48	405	279
47	Maciej Rutkowski	Poland	5	21	7	19	30^{†}	15	29	25	BFD 51^{†}	DNC 48^{†}	DNC 48	DNF 48	DNC 48	DNC 48	442	313
48	Bernat Tomas	Spain	RDG 21.6	15	13	25^{†}	15	23	25	27^{†}	23	2	2	4	10^{†}	8	213.6	151.6
49	Jorge Aranzueque	Spain	23	35^{†}	17	21	22	5	35^{†}	29	29	10	3	3	3	20^{†}	255	165
50	Matteo Benz	Switzerland	25	31^{†}	29	29	9	31	11	DNF 51^{†}	19	1	16^{†}	8	4	5	269	171
51	Leonidas Tsortanidis	Greece	19	17	17	33^{†}	21	21	23	23	31^{†}	9	13^{†}	1	8	12	248	171
52	Geronimo Nores	United States	21	19	15	1	41^{†}	DSQ 51^{†}	19	41	15	6	18^{†}	13	16	7	283	173
53	Ching Yin Cheng	Hong Kong	DSQ 51^{†}	37^{†}	35	29	33	21	15	5	9	5	UFD 47^{†}	22	2	4	315	180
54	Nimrod Mashiah	Israel	17	35	15	25	41^{†}	19	27	5	39^{†}	4	17	10	11	33^{†}	298	185
55	Noah Lyons	United States	BFD 51^{†}	BFD 51^{†}	DNF 51	13	2	RDG 32.1	15	25	19	16^{†}	8	15	1	6	305.1	187.1
56	Niklas Lillelund	Denmark	3	37	33	39^{†}	37	33	23	11	BFD 51^{†}	7	DNF 47^{†}	2	14	1	338	201
57	Makoto Tomizawa	Japan	33^{†}	27	19	23	38^{†}	29	13	23	25	13	11	9	15^{†}	10	288	202
58	Luka Mratović	Croatia	11	31	23	DNC 51^{†}	30	37^{†}	27	13	31	30^{†}	9	6	12	14	325	207
59	Patrick Haybittle	New Zealand	BFD 51^{†}	15	39^{†}	33	31	39	31	23	23	3	1	5	6	21^{†}	321	210
60	Sebastian Scharer	Switzerland	25	17	41	33	35	1	BFD 51^{†}	35	BFD 51^{†}	25^{†}	6	7	5	11	343	216
61	Alexander Temko	United States	21	29^{†}	11	17	28	27	23	29^{†}	21	11	20	BFD 47^{†}	27	15	326	221
62	Renar Roolaht	Estonia	27	31	DNF 51^{†}	27	25	33	43^{†}	11	17	12	19^{†}	12	18	17	343	230
63	Val Erzen	Slovenia	29	33	39^{†}	31	25	29	5	33	37^{†}	14	23^{†}	23	9	9	339	240
64	Andreas Cariolou	Cyprus	19	25	27	15	27	33^{†}	25	29	31^{†}	15	21	28^{†}	26	22	343	251
65	Jonne Heimann	Germany	23	17	37	23	36	25	47^{†}	DNF 51^{†}	23	17	7	31^{†}	23	23	383	254
66	Robert Kubin	Slovakia	21	35^{†}	DNF 51^{†}	35	26	25	35	31	25	8	12	BFD 47^{†}	19	19	389	256
67	Romek Roolaht	Estonia	25	29	13	35	38^{†}	31	41^{†}	17	21	28	15	18	24	29^{†}	364	256
68	Pedro Pascual	United States	37^{†}	23	25	35	24	17	15	33	43^{†}	18	30	11	28	31^{†}	370	259
69	Malik Hoveling	Aruba	27	19	DNF 51^{†}	39^{†}	29	27	37	31	35	20	4	27	13	DNF 47^{†}	406	269
70	Vidar Nyström	Sweden	25	BFD 51^{†}	23	23	32^{†}	29	19	25	27	23	UFD 47^{†}	29	25	35	413	283
71	Byron Kokkalanis	Greece	13	33	41	BFD 51^{†}	34	DSQ 51^{†}	43	DNC 51	15	19	10	26	36^{†}	3	426	288
72	Andy Leung	Hong Kong	37	29	21	25	43^{†}	33	RDG 31.9	27	BFD 51^{†}	38^{†}	38	20	20	16	429.9	297.9
73	Iakovos Christofidis	Cyprus	35	25	41	45^{†}	BFD 51^{†}	35	27	27	31	21	25^{†}	24	21	13	421	300
74	William McMillan	Thailand	31	BFD 51^{†}	DNF 51^{†}	DNF 51	34	43	DNC 51	DNC 51	13	24^{†}	5	21	7	2	435	309
75	Tomonori Anami	Japan	27	39	35	33	42^{†}	41^{†}	RDG 21	35	33	37^{†}	26	14	22	27	432	312
76	Bence Santa	Hungary	DNF 51^{†}	31	33	27	33	29	31	35^{†}	27	26	31^{†}	19	29	28	430	313
77	Karel Lavický	Czech Republic	39	43	39	DNF 51^{†}	23	23	39	43	45^{†}	DNF 47^{†}	14	16	17	18	457	314
78	Samuel Perez	Dominican Republic	43^{†}	23	37	43^{†}	35	35	33	25	27	22	22	BFD 47^{†}	35	24	451	318
79	David Drda	Czech Republic	STP 30	37^{†}	31	23	27	RDG 33.4	29	DNC 51^{†}	33	29	27	25	UFD 47^{†}	UFD 47	469.4	334.4
80	Thomas Broucke	Belgium	21	27	19	19	28	25	17	29^{†}	37^{†}	DNC 47^{†}	DNC 47	DNC 47	DNC 47	DNC 47	457	344
81	Daiya Kuramochi	Japan	37	41^{†}	31	BFD 51^{†}	39	35	37	31	39	27	28	17	37^{†}	26	476	347
82	Simon Gomez Ortiz	Colombia	37	23	43^{†}	27	42^{†}	41	31	37	33	31	29	30	40^{†}	30	474	349
83	Jerónimo Abogado	Mexico	35	33	43^{†}	37	32	31	39^{†}	37	29	36	39^{†}	37	33	25	486	365
84	Theo Peter	Austria	33^{†}	29	25	25	DNF 51^{†}	27	33	33	27	35	37	DNF 47^{†}	DNC 47	DNC 47	496	365
85	Abdulmajeed Al-Hadhrami	Oman	29	33	25	DNC 51^{†}	DNF 51^{†}	19	39	DNC 51	41	42^{†}	32	36	34	34	517	373
86	Mate Bors	Hungary	33	41	27	39	DNF 51^{†}	45	21	47^{†}	41	32	33	38	31	39^{†}	518	381
87	Jack Marquardt	Australia	31	45	23	DNC 51^{†}	39	37	35	DNC 51^{†}	DNC 51	33	35	33	32	37^{†}	533	394
88	Martins Dancauskis	Latvia	39	43	DNF 51^{†}	37	DNF 51^{†}	43	33	41	35	40^{†}	24	32	30	38	537	395
89	Dayne Coelho	India	39	35	DNF 51^{†}	DNF 51^{†}	40	39	29	43	29	39^{†}	34	35	39	36	539	398
90	Oleksandr Mendelenko	Ukraine	41^{†}	25	33	31	40	37	39	37	BFD 51^{†}	34	UFD 47^{†}	BFD 47	41	UFD 47	550	411
91	Jerome Kumar Savarimuthu	India	45	41	43	DNF 51^{†}	DNF 51^{†}	41	45	45	37	41^{†}	36	34	38	32	580	437
92	Mehdi Guembri	Tunisia	41	DNC 51^{†}	BFD 51^{†}	41	DNF 51	39	41	39	35	DNF 47^{†}	DNC 47	DNC 47	DNC 47	DNC 47	624	475
93	Sachin Ganesh	India	41	43	45^{†}	37	DNF 51^{†}	45	RDG 42.1	41	43	DNF 47^{†}	DNF 47	DNF 47	DNF 47	DNC 47	623.1	480.1

Scoring system: low-point system; Source:
Legend: – Advance to final; – Advance to semi-final; – Advance to quarter-final; BFD – Black flag disqualification; DNC – Did not come to the starting area; DNF – Did not finish; DSQ – Disqualified; RDG – Redress given; STP – Standard penalty imposed; UFD – "U" flag disqualification; † – Discarded race not counted in the overall result;

=== Medal series ===
Results of individual races
Pos	Helmsman	Country	QF	SF	F
Gold medal	Luuc van Opzeeland	Netherlands	–	1	1
Silver medal	Sebastian Kördel	Germany	–	2	2
Bronze medal	Nicolò Renna	Italy	–	–	3
4	Luca Di Tomassi	Italy	2	3	–
5	Sam Sills	Great Britain	STP 1.6	4	–
6	Yoav Omer	Israel	3	–	–
7	Josh Armit	New Zealand	4	–	–
8	Louis Pignolet	France	5	–	–
9	Grae Morris	Australia	BFD 8	–	–
10	Thomas Goyard	France	BFD 8	–	–

Legend: BFD – Black flag disqualification; STP – Standard penalty imposed;
