= Swimming at the 2020 Summer Olympics – Men's 200 metre freestyle =

Men's 200 metre freestyle at the Games of the XXXII Olympiad
- Swimming pictogram
- Venue: Tokyo Aquatics Centre
- Dates: 25 July 2021 (heats); 26 July 2021 (semifinals); 27 July 2021 (final)
- Competitors: 39 from 30 nations
- Winning time: 1:44.22 NR

Medalists
1st place, gold medalist(s)		Tom Dean	Great Britain
2nd place, silver medalist(s)		Duncan Scott	Great Britain
3rd place, bronze medalist(s)		Fernando Scheffer	Brazil

The men's 200 metre freestyle event at the 2020 Summer Olympics was held from 25 to 27 July 2021 at the Tokyo Aquatics Centre. There were 39 competitors from 30 nations, with the ultimate numbers determined through the ongoing selection process, including universality places.

== Background ==
It was the event's 16th appearance, having been held in 1900 and 1904 and then at every edition since 1968.

The only finalist from the 2016 Games to return was fifth-place finisher Townley Haas of the United States, who did not make the final this time. Reigning Olympic champion and two-time reigning World Champion Sun Yang of China missed the Games due to a doping ban.

== Summary ==
Great Britain's Tom Dean put up a monumental effort for the Olympic mid-distance freestyle title in a race against his compatriot Duncan Scott. Swimming beside the early-leader in Korea's Hwang Sun-woo, Dean was second at the 50 m metre mark before falling to third at the last turn with Scott fifth. However, by the final 25 m, the race for gold came down to Dean and Scott, with the former taking the win in a British record of 1:44.22. Scott, the British record holder heading into the Games, finished an agonising 0.04 seconds behind to take the silver in a new personal best of 1:44.26. The pair's 1-2 finish represented the first British quinella in a pool event since the London Games in 1908.

Swimming out of lane 8, Brazil's Fernando Scheffer was in second at the final turn. While Scheffer was overtaken by Dean and Scott, he held on to win bronze in a South American record of 1:44.66. In lane 1, Romania's 16-year old David Popovici charged in the final lap though he could not reel in Scheffer, missing the podium by 0.02 seconds to come fourth. ROC's Martin Malyutin (1:45.01) was just outside the 1:44 barrier to come fifth, while the U.S.' 400 free Bronze medallist Kieran Smith (1:45.12) placed sixth.

World Junior record holder Hwang (1:45.26) was under world record pace at the halfway mark and led at the final turn, but faded in the closing stages to come seventh. Lithuania's Danas Rapšys was more than a second off his best time, finishing in 1:45.78 to round out the finalists.

== Qualification ==
The Olympic Qualifying Time for the event was 1:47.02. Up to two swimmers per National Olympic Committee (NOC) could automatically qualify by swimming that time at an approved qualification event. The Olympic Selection Time was 1:50.23. Up to one swimmer per NOC meeting that time was eligible for selection, allocated by world ranking until the maximum quota for all swimming events is reached. NOCs without a male swimmer qualified in any event could also use their universality place.

== Competition format ==
The competition consisted of three rounds: heats, semifinals, and a final. The swimmers with the best 16 times in the heats advanced to the semifinals. The swimmers with the best 8 times in the semifinals advanced to the final. A swim-off were used to break a tie for advancement to the next round.

== Records ==
Prior to this competition, the existing world and Olympic records were as follows.

World record	Paul Biedermann (GER)	1:42.00	Rome, Italy	28 July 2009
Olympic record	Michael Phelps (USA)	1:42.96	Beijing, China	12 August 2008

No new records were set during the competition.

== Schedule ==
The event was moved to a three-day schedule, with each round on separate, consecutive days. All times are Japan Standard Time (UTC+9)

Date	Time	Round
Sunday, 25 July 2021	19:17	Heats
Monday, 26 July 2021	10:37	Semifinals
Tuesday, 27 July 2021	10:43	Final

== Results ==
=== Heats ===
The swimmers with the top 16 times, regardless of heat, advanced to the semifinals.

Rank	Heat	Lane	Swimmer	Nation	Time	Notes
1	3	5	Hwang Sun-woo	South Korea	1:44.62	Q, WJ, NR
2	4	2	Fernando Scheffer	Brazil	1:45.05	Q, SA
3	3	4	Tom Dean	Great Britain	1:45.24	Q
4	2	1	David Popovici	Romania	1:45.32	Q
5	4	4	Duncan Scott	Great Britain	1:45.37	Q
6	4	5	Martin Malyutin	ROC	1:45.50	Q
7	3	7	Stefano Ballo	Italy	1:45.80	Q
8	5	2	Thomas Neill	Australia	1:45.81	Q
9	5	4	Danas Rapšys	Lithuania	1:45.84	Q
10	3	6	Townley Haas	United States	1:45.86	Q
11	5	8	Kregor Zirk	Estonia	1:46.10	Q, NR
12	3	1	Nándor Németh	Hungary	1:46.19	Q
13	5	3	Kieran Smith	United States	1:46.20	Q
14	2	3	Velimir Stjepanović	Serbia	1:46.26	Q
15	3	2	Antonio Djakovic	Switzerland	1:46.37	Q
16	4	1	Stefano Di Cola	Italy	1:46.67	Q
17	5	5	Katsuhiro Matsumoto	Japan	1:46.69	WSO
17	5	7	Lukas Märtens	Germany	1:46.69	LSO
19	2	5	Jacob Heidtmann	Germany	1:46.73	
20	4	8	Jordan Pothain	France	1:46.75	
21	4	3	Ji Xinjie	China	1:46.86	
22	5	6	Elijah Winnington	Australia	1:46.99	
23	4	7	Robin Hanson	Sweden	1:47.02	
24	3	3	Ivan Girev	ROC	1:47.11	
24	5	1	Murilo Sartori	Brazil	1:47.11	
26	2	8	Alexei Sancov	Moldova	1:47.46	
27	2	4	Denis Loktev	Israel	1:47.68	
28	3	8	Jonathan Atsu	France	1:47.75	
29	2	7	Alex Sobers	Barbados	1:48.09	NR
30	4	6	Dominik Kozma	Hungary	1:48.87	
31	1	6	Dimitrios Markos	Greece	1:49.16	
32	2	2	Welson Sim	Malaysia	1:49.24	
33	1	5	Mikel Schreuders	Aruba	1:49.43	
34	2	6	Baturalp Ünlü	Turkey	1:49.75	
35	1	3	Joaquín Vargas	Peru	1:49.93	NR
36	1	2	Mokhtar Al-Yamani	Yemen	1:49.97	
37	1	4	Wesley Roberts	Cook Islands	1:50.41	
38	1	7	James Freeman	Botswana	1:52.87	
39	1	1	Audai Hassouna	Libya	1:56.27	

Swim-off

Rank	Lane	Swimmer	Nation	Time	Notes
1	4	Katsuhiro Matsumoto	Japan	1:46.06	
2	5	Lukas Märtens	Germany	1:46.40	

=== Semifinals ===
The swimmers with the best 8 times, regardless of heat, advanced to the final.

Rank	Heat	Lane	Swimmer	Nation	Time	Notes
1	2	3	Duncan Scott	Great Britain	1:44.60	Q
2	2	1	Kieran Smith	United States	1:45.07	Q
3	2	2	Danas Rapšys	Lithuania	1:45.32	Q
4	2	5	Tom Dean	Great Britain	1:45.34	Q
5	1	3	Martin Malyutin	ROC	1:45.45	Q
6	2	4	Hwang Sun-woo	South Korea	1:45.53	Q
7	1	5	David Popovici	Romania	1:45.68	Q
8	1	4	Fernando Scheffer	Brazil	1:45.71	Q
9	1	6	Thomas Neill	Australia	1:45.74	
10	2	6	Stefano Ballo	Italy	1:45.84	
11	2	8	Antonio Djakovic	Switzerland	1:45.92	
12	1	2	Townley Haas	United States	1:46.07	
13	2	7	Kregor Zirk	Estonia	1:46.67	
14	1	8	Stefano Di Cola	Italy	1:47.19	
15	1	7	Nándor Németh	Hungary	1:47.20	
16	1	1	Velimir Stjepanović	Serbia	1:47.62	

=== Final ===
200m freestyle final

Rank	Lane	Swimmer	Nation	Time	Notes
1st place, gold medalist(s)	6	Tom Dean	Great Britain	1:44.22	NR
2nd place, silver medalist(s)	4	Duncan Scott	Great Britain	1:44.26	
3rd place, bronze medalist(s)	8	Fernando Scheffer	Brazil	1:44.66	SA
4	1	David Popovici	Romania	1:44.68	NR
5	2	Martin Malyutin	ROC	1:45.01	
6	5	Kieran Smith	United States	1:45.12	
7	7	Hwang Sun-woo	South Korea	1:45.26	
8	3	Danas Rapšys	Lithuania	1:45.78	
