= Aruba at the 2008 Summer Olympics =

- IOC code: ARU
- NOC: Aruban Olympic Committee
- Website: www.olympicaruba.com (in Papiamento)

in Beijing
- Competitors: 2 in 2 sports
- Flag bearers: Fiderd Vis (opening); Jan Roodzant (closing)
- Medals: Gold 0 Silver 0 Bronze 0 Total 0

Summer Olympics appearances (overview)
- 1988; 1992; 1996; 2000; 2004; 2008; 2012; 2016; 2020; 2024; 2028

Other related appearances
- Netherlands Antilles (1952–2008)

Aruba competed at the 2008 Summer Olympics in Beijing, China. Their participation marked their sixth Olympic appearance, and included the smallest number of athletes that had ever represented Aruba in its history. Two Arubans competed in the Olympic games: Jan Roodzant participated as a swimmer, and Fiderd Vis participated in judo. The Aruban delegation arrived in Beijing between August 1 and August 4, including the athletes, coaches, and various officials from both the IOC and the Aruban Olympic Committee (Comité Olimpico Arubano, COA), Aruba's local Olympic committee. Fiderd Vis came to Beijing on special invitation from the IOC, which had observed his progress while he trained in Brazil. Vis was the flagbearer in the opening ceremony, while Roodzant was so in the closing ceremony. Both athletes were eliminated in the preliminary rounds on August 12, 2008; consequently, Aruba did not earn any medals.

== Background ==
Aruba have competed in five consecutive Olympic Games by 2008; its entrance into the Beijing Olympics marked its sixth consecutive appearance since the 1988 Summer Olympics in Seoul, South Korea. In the summer of 2008, the fewest athletes in Aruba's history thus far participated in the Olympics, with two men participating in two events. This compares with Aruba's participation in the previous 2004 Summer Olympics in Athens, where Aruba was represented by four athletes of three sports. Aruba's 2008 Olympic representatives included no female athletes, which had occurred only once previously in Atlanta's 1996 Summer Olympics (three male athletes participating in three distinct sports).

On August 1, 2008, the Aruban athletes left for Beijing aboard KLM Flight 765. Vis and Roodzant were accompanied by their trainers and COA officials Edmundo Josiah and Chu Halabi. COA president Leo Maduro and COA officials Mary Hsing and Ling Wong left for Beijing three days later. Alongside IOC member Nicole Hoevertsz, this group formed the Aruban delegation to the 2008 Summer Olympics.

The Aruban delegation arrived at the Olympic Village on August 6, 2008, alongside the delegations of Paraguay, Cuba, and Tuvalu. As part of the welcoming ceremony, the Chinese military hoisted the Aruban flag, and the Aruban national anthem "Aruba Dushi Tera" was performed. The Aruban delegation and the governing body of the Olympic Village exchanged gifts.

Aruba's athletes were 109th to enter the Beijing National Stadium during the march of nations of the opening ceremony. Fiderd Vis, the only judoka representing Aruba, was the flagbearer. During the closing ceremony, the swimmer Jan Roodzant was the flagbearer.

== Judo ==
Fiderd Vis was the only Aruban participating as a judoka in the Beijing Olympics. He was trained by Alberto Thiel.

To train for the Olympics, Fiderd Vis left Aruba to train in Brazil, taking advantage of an agreement between the COA and the Brazilian Olympic Committee and another between the COA and the Brazilian Judo Confederation fostered after Aruba's participation in the 2007 Pan American Games in Rio de Janeiro. Vis left for Brasília on Wednesday, June 4, 2008, to participate in Campeonato Suramericano. He later traveled to São Paulo to train with Brazilian judokas. Having seen Vis's progress, the International Olympic Committee extended to him a special invitation that guaranteed his participation in the Beijing Olympics. The COA accepted the invitation, and Fiderd Vis became Aruba's second and final athlete for the year's Olympic Games.

Vis faced Guo Lei of China on August 12 in the fourteenth match of the preliminary round of 32. He was defeated, and did not advance.

| Athlete | Event | Preliminary | Round of 32 | Round of 16 | Quarterfinals | Semifinals | Repechage 1 | Repechage 2 | Repechage 3 | Final / BM | |
| Athlete | Event | Opposition Result | Opposition Result | Opposition Result | Opposition Result | Opposition Result | Opposition Result | Opposition Result | Opposition Result | Opposition Result | Rank |
|---|---|---|---|---|---|---|---|---|---|---|---|
| Fiderd Vis | Men's −81 kg | Bye | Guo L (CHN); L 0000–1100 | Did not advance | | | | | | | |

== Swimming ==
Netherlands-born Jan Roodzant was the only Aruban swimmer to participate in the Beijing Summer Olympics.

Roodzant spent the year prior to the Olympics with trainer Ismael Santiesteban, preparing in Gainesville, Florida, receiving specialist training alongside the University of Florida's swim team. He returned to Aruba for a few days, starting February 26, 2008, but soon returned to the United States to resume his training. Roodzant sook to qualify for FINA by doing well at the CARIFTA Swimming Championships; in qualifying for FINA, Roodzant secured a spot in the Beijing Olympics.

Roodzant completed his last practice in Beijing on August 11, 2008, the day before his competition. Roodzant was assigned to heat 2 for his race. He was the fastest swimmer in his heat during the preliminaries of August 12, with a time of 51.69s in the men's 100 metre freestyle event. Overall, however, he was 53rd out of 64 in the event, and as a result, he did not advance.

| Athlete | Event | Heat | | Semifinal | | Final | |
| Athlete | Event | Time | Rank | Time | Rank | Time | Rank |
|---|---|---|---|---|---|---|---|
| Jan Roodzant | Men's 100 m freestyle | 51.69 | 53 | Did not advance | | | |

== See also ==
- Aruba at the 2007 Pan American Games
- Aruba at the 2010 Central American and Caribbean Games
