= Aruba at the 1996 Summer Olympics =

- IOC code: ARU
- NOC: Aruban Olympic Committee
- Website: www.olympicaruba.com (in Papiamento)

in Atlanta
- Competitors: 3 (3 men and 0 women) in 3 sports
- Flag bearer: Isnardo Faro
- Medals: Gold 0 Silver 0 Bronze 0 Total 0

Summer Olympics appearances (overview)
- 1988; 1992; 1996; 2000; 2004; 2008; 2012; 2016; 2020; 2024

Other related appearances
- Netherlands Antilles (1952–2008)

Aruba sent a delegation to compete at the 1996 Summer Olympics in Atlanta, United States from 19 July to 4 August 1996. This was Aruba's third appearance at a Summer Olympic Games since separating from the Netherlands Antilles. The Aruban delegation consisted of three competitors, track and field athlete Miguel Janssen, weightlifter Junior Faro, and cyclist Lucien Dirksz. Janseen was eliminated in the first round of the men's 200 metres, Faro finished 21st in the men's middleweight, and Dirksz failed to finish his event.

== Background ==
The Aruban Olympic Committee was recognised by the International Olympic Committee on 1 January 1986. Aruba made its Olympic debut as a distinct territory soon after, at the 1988 Seoul Olympics, and they have participated in every Summer Olympic Games since. The 1996 Summer Olympics were held in Atlanta, United States, from 19 July to 4 August 1996; 10,318 athletes took part representing 194 National Olympic Committees. Atlanta was Aruba's third time participating in the Summer Olympics. The Aruban delegation to these Olympics consisted of three competitors, track and field athlete Miguel Janssen, weightlifter Junior Faro, and cyclist Lucien Dirksz. Faro was chosen as the flag-bearer for the opening ceremony.

== Competitors ==
The following is the list of number of competitors in the Games.

Sport	Men	Women	Total
Athletics	1	0	1
Cycling	1	0	1
Weightlifting	1	–	1
Total	3	0	3

== Athletics ==
Miguel Janssen was 25 years old at the time of the Atlanta Olympics, and was making his only Olympic appearance. On 31 July, he took part in the first round of the men's 200 metres, and was drawn into heat ten. He finished the race in 21.72 seconds, seventh and last in his heat, and he was eliminated from the competition. The gold medal was eventually won by Michael Johnson of the United States in 19.32 seconds, the silver medal was earned by Frankie Fredericks of Namibia, and the bronze was won by Ato Boldon of Trinidad and Tobago.

Athlete	Event	Heat		Quarterfinal		Semifinal		Final	
Athlete	Event	Result	Rank	Result	Rank	Result	Rank	Result	Rank
Miguel Janssen	Men's 200 m	21.72	7	did not advance					

== Cycling ==
Lucien Dirksz was 27 years old at the time of these Olympics, and had previously represented Aruba at the 1992 Barcelona Olympics. On 31 July, he took part in the 221.85 kilometres (137.85 mi) men's road race, but failed to finish the competition. The gold medal was won by Pascal Richard of Switzerland in 4 hours 53 minutes and 56 seconds; the silver was earned by Rolf Sørensen of Denmark, and the bronze was taken by Max Sciandri of Great Britain.

Athlete	Event	Time	Rank
Lucien Dirksz	Men's road race	DNF	

== Weightlifting ==
Isnarda "Junior" Faro was 18 years old at the time of the Atlanta Olympics, and would, 8 years later, represent Aruba again at the 2004 Athens Olympics. In Olympic weightlifting a competitor is given three tries to lift a weight of their choice in the snatch, with the best of their three attempts counting. If an athlete posts a mark in the snatch, they then get three attempts at the clean and jerk, again, with the best of the three marks counting. A final score is determined by adding the best mark posted in the snatch and the clean and jerk together. On 24 July, Faro took part in the men's under 76 kg competition, meaning competitors had to weigh in at or below 76 kg. In the snatch, he lifted 102.5 kg, 107.5 kg, and 112.5 kg; recording a mark for this phase of the competition of 112.5 kg. Later, in the clean and jerk, he lifted 132.5 kg in his first attempt, 137.5 kg in his second, and failed at 142.5 kg in his third and final try; recording a mark for the clean and jerk of 137.5 kg. His combined lift of 250.0 kg put him 21st and last among those who posted marks for both phases of the competition. The gold medal was won by Pablo Lara of Cuba with a combined lift of 367.5 kg, the silver medal was taken by Yoto Yotov of Bulgaria, and the bronze medal was earned by Jon Chol-ho of North Korea.

Athlete	Event	Snatch		Clean & Jerk		Total	Rank
Athlete	Event	Result	Rank	Result	Rank	Total	Rank
Junior Faro	Men's −76 kg	112.5	22	137.5	21	250.0	21
