= Jan Roodzant =

Aruban swimmer (born 1984)

Personal information
- Full name: Jan Daniel Roodzant
- Nationality: Aruba
- Born: January 6, 1984 (age 42) Ede, Netherlands
- Height: 6 ft 3 in (1.91 m)
- Weight: 80 kg (180 lb)

Sport
- Sport: Swimming
- Strokes: Freestyle

Jan Roodzant (born January 6, 1984, in Ede, Netherlands) is an Olympic-swimmer from Aruba. He swam for Aruba at the:

- 2008 Olympics,
- 2007 World Championships, and
- 2006 Central American and Caribbean Games.
