= Huang Jingye =

Chinese windsurfer (born 2003)

Personal information
- Nationality: Chinese
- Born: 23 April 2003 (age 23) Wenzhou, China

Sport
- Sport: Sailing

Huang Jingye (黄 敬业; born 23 April 2003) is a sailor from China, who competes in windsurfing competitions. He represents his nation at international competitions.

He participated at the 2023 Sailing World Championships in the iQFoil event. The next year he placed 19th in the iQFoil event at the 2024 Summer Olympics.
