= Pierre de Windt =

Aruban sprinter (born 1983)

Pierre Eric Omar (Peppie) de Windt (born 13 July 1983, Oranjestad), is an Aruban athlete who ran in the men's 100 meters for Aruba at the 2004 Summer Olympics in Athens, Greece.
