= Sailing at the 2024 Summer Olympics – Men's iQFoil =

Men's iQFoil at the Games of the XXXIII Olympiad
- Venues: Marseille Marina
- Dates: 28 July–3 August 2024
- Competitors: 24 from 24 nations

Medalists
1st place, gold medalist(s)		Tom Reuveny	Israel
2nd place, silver medalist(s)		Grae Morris	Australia
3rd place, bronze medalist(s)		Luuc van Opzeeland	Netherlands

The men's iQFoil competition at the 2024 Summer Olympics was the men's windsurfer event and was held in Marseille, France, from 29 July to 2 August 2024. It is the first men's windsurfing competition to use the iQFoil craft, which replaces the RS:X vessels that had been used in the previous four Olympics.

24 sailors from 24 nations competed in 13 opening series races. The boat finishing first will compete directly in the final, while the second and third-ranked boats will appear in the semi-finals. Boats ranked fourth to 10th will feature in the quarter-finals, from which the top two will make it to the semi-finals. The top two boats in the semi-finals will join the first-ranked team from the opening series in the final race.

A boat's final rank will be relative to its finishing place in the race it was eliminated. For instance, boats in the final are ranked ahead of the semi-final participants, boats in the quarter-finals are ranked ahead of the opening series participants.

== Schedule ==
Mon 29 Jul	Tue 30 Jul	Wed 31 Jul	Thu 1 Aug	Fri 2 Aug	Sat 3 Aug
Race 1	Race 2 Race 3 Race 4 Race 5 Race 6	Race 7 Race 8 Race 9 Race 10	Race 11; Race 12; Race 13	~~Quarterfinal~~; ~~Semifinal~~; ~~Final~~; Postponed	Quarterfinal; Semifinal; Final

== Results ==
=== Preliminary races ===
Source after race 13:

Results of individual races
Pos	Helmsman	Country	I	II	III	IV	V	VI	VII	VIII	IX	X	XI	XII	XIII	Tot	Pts
1	Grae Morris	Australia	13^{†}	24^{†} (DNS)	10	9	1	7	2	1	9	2	4	7	8	98	60
2	Tom Reuveny	Israel	8	13	5	3	3	4	25^{†} (BFD)	3	5	13	14^{†}	4	2	102	63
3	Josh Armit	New Zealand	4	18^{†}	1	14	8	25^{†} (UFD)	11	2	6	4	2	3	11	109	66
4	Paweł Tarnowski	Poland	12^{†}	3	6	2	9	2	5	5	10	10	3	11	23^{†}	101	66
5	Luuc van Opzeeland	Netherlands	25^{†} (BFD)	9	2	1	6	1	3	25^{†} (DSQ)	11	14	15	1	6	119	69
6	Nicolò Renna	Italy	2	15; RDG	25^{†} (DNF)	4	2	5	25^{†} (BFD)	12	12	7	1	9	4	123	73
7	Noah Lyons	United States	5	1	8	13	12	3	9	6	25^{†} (BFD)	11	6	14	22^{†}	135	88
8	Sam Sills	Great Britain	21^{†}	6	9	7	16^{†}	6	7	9	4	15	7	6	12	125	88
9	Ethan Westera	Aruba	11	12	12	17^{†}	10	13^{†}	8	11	3	6	8	2	7	120	90
10	Elia Colombo	Switzerland	9	7	22^{†}	6	11	10	25^{†} (BFD)	8	13	9	13	13	1	147	100
11	Nacho Baltasar	Spain	15	5	13	10	17	11	25^{†} (BFD)	4	8	12	25^{†} (DSQ)	5	3	153	103
12	Sebastian Kördel	Germany	10	15	21^{†}	11	20	16	25^{†} BFD	2 RDG	1	1	11	8	9	150	104
13	Cheng Ching Yin	Hong Kong	20^{†}	14	7	25^{†} (BFD)	14	9	1	10	7	5	5	19	15	151	106
14	Johan Søe	Denmark	3	25^{†} (DNS)	4	25^{†} (BFD)	7	8	12	7	25 (BFD)	3	12	21	10	162	112
15	Nicolas Goyard	France	1	16	11	5	5	14	18^{†}	15	14	16	22^{†}	15	18	170	130
16	Mateus Isaac	Brazil	25^{†} (BFD)	2	14	8	13	15	16	18	15	8	19^{†}	16	5	174	130
17	Rytis Jasiūnas	Lithuania	16	19	20^{†}	12	21^{†}	12	4	14	2	20	16	12	17	185	144
18	Makoto Tomizawa	Japan	6	20	3	25^{†} (BFD)	15	18	13	17	18	21^{†}	9	17	13	195	149
19	Huang Jingye	China	7	11	23^{†}	16	22	17	6	20	25^{†} (BFD)	23	17	18	14	219	171
20	Jakob Eklund	Finland	14	17	18	19^{†}	18	20^{†}	10	16	16	19	18	10	16	211	172
21	Francisco Saubidet	Argentina	17	4	17	15	19	25^{†} (UFD)	15	13	17	18	21	23^{†}	19	223	175
22	Byron Kokkalanis	Greece	18	8	15	25^{†} (BFD)	4	19	25^{†} (BFD)	19	25 (BFD)	17	10	22	21	228	178
23	Robert Kubin	Slovakia	19	10	16	18	23^{†}	21	14	21	19	22^{†}	20	20	20	243	198
24	Rami Boudrouma	Algeria	22	21	19	20	24^{†}	22	17	22	20	24	23	25^{†} (DNF)	24	283	234

Scoring system: low-point system;
Legend: – Qualified for medal race(s); BFD – Black flag disqualification; DNF – Did not finish; DNS – Did not start; DPI – Discretionary penalty imposed; OCS – On the course side of the starting line; RDG – Redress given; UFD – "U" flag disqualification; † – Discarded race not counted in the overall result;

=== Medal series ===
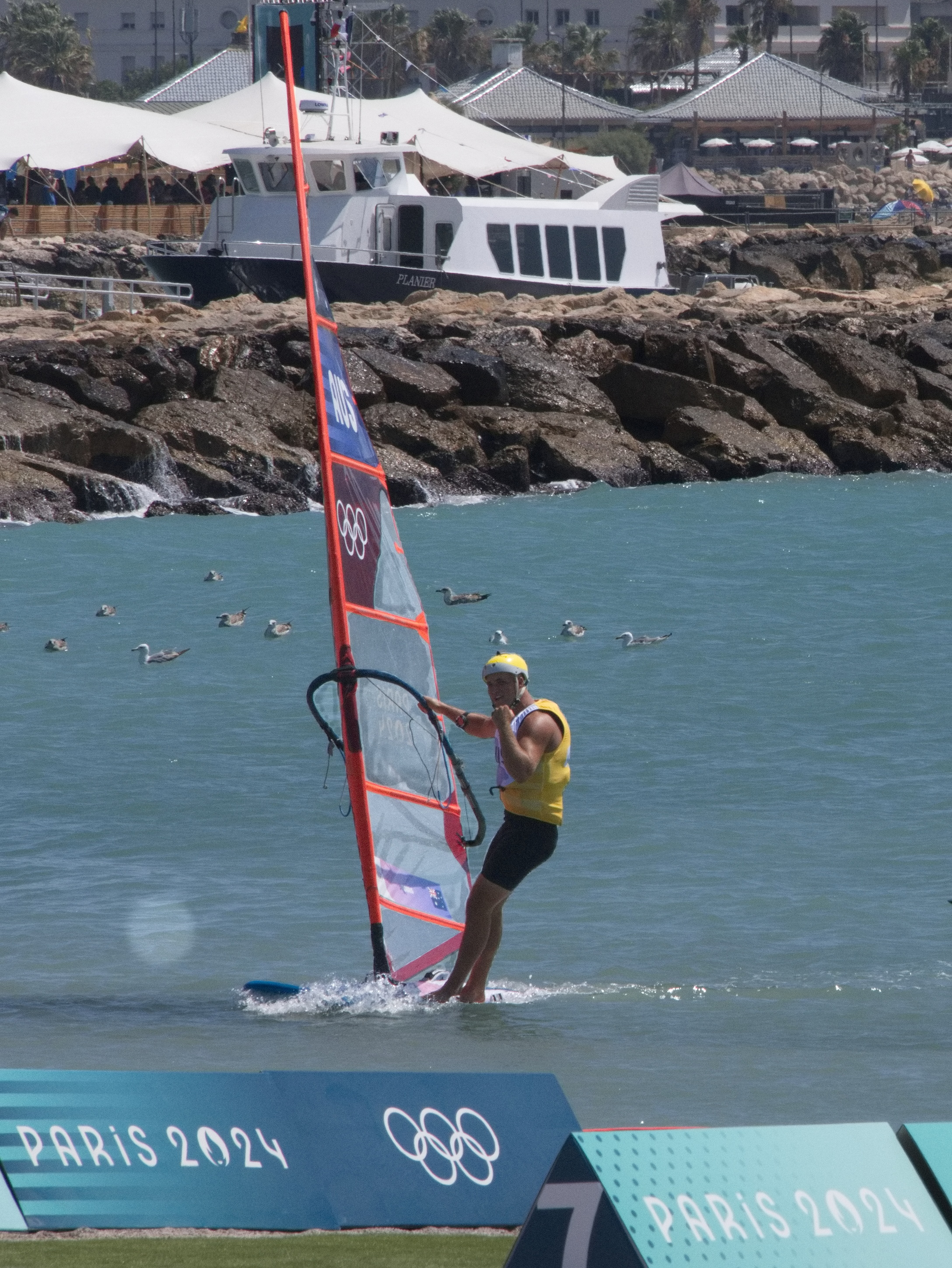
Grae Morris after securing the silver medal.

Final results

Rank	Helmsman	Nation	Quarterfinal	Semifinal	Medal Race
1st place, gold medalist(s)	Tom Reuveny	Israel	Bye	2	1
2nd place, silver medalist(s)	Grae Morris	Australia	Bye		2
3rd place, bronze medalist(s)	Luuc van Opzeeland	Netherlands	1	1	3
4	Josh Armit	New Zealand	Bye	3	—N/a
5	Sam Sills	Great Britain	2	4	—N/a
6	Nicolò Renna	Italy	3	—N/a	
7	Elia Colombo	Switzerland	4	—N/a	
8	Ethan Westera	Aruba	5	—N/a	
9	Noah Lyons	United States	6	—N/a	
10	Paweł Tarnowski	Poland	7	—N/a	

Scoring system: low-point system;
Legend: – Qualified for medal race(s); BFD – Black flag disqualification; DNF – Did not finish; DNS – Did not start; DPI – Discretionary penalty imposed; OCS – On the course side of the starting line; RDG – Redress given; UFD – "U" flag disqualification; † – Discarded race not counted in the overall result;
