= Aruba at the 1988 Summer Olympics =

- IOC code: ARU
- NOC: Aruban Olympic Committee

in Seoul
- Competitors: 8 (4 men and 4 women) in 5 sports
- Flag bearer: Victor Maduro
- Medals: Gold 0 Silver 0 Bronze 0 Total 0

Summer Olympics appearances (overview)
- 1988; 1992; 1996; 2000; 2004; 2008; 2012; 2016; 2020; 2024; 2028

Other related appearances
- Netherlands Antilles (1952–2008)

Aruba competed in the Olympic Games for the first time at the 1988 Summer Olympics in Seoul, South Korea. Previously, Aruba was part of Netherlands Antilles, Kingdom of the Netherlands until 1986. Eight competitors, four men and four women, took part in ten events in five sports.

== Competitors ==
The following is the list of number of competitors in the Games.

Sport	Men	Women	Total
Athletics	0	2	2
Boxing	2	–	2
Fencing	1	0	1
Judo	1	–	1
Synchronized swimming	–	2	2
Total	4	4	8

== Athletics ==
Women
Track & road events

Athlete	Event	Heat		Quarterfinal		Semifinal		Final	
Athlete	Event	Result	Rank	Result	Rank	Result	Rank	Result	Rank
Evelyn Farrell	100 m	12.48	8	did not advance					
Evelyn Farrell	200 m	25.74	8	did not advance					
Cornelia Melis	Marathon	—N/a						2.54:37	56

== Boxing ==
Men

Athlete	Event	1 Round	2 Round	3 Round	Quarterfinals	Semifinals	Final
Athlete	Event	Opposition Result	Opposition Result	Opposition Result	Opposition Result	Opposition Result	Rank
Hubert Wester	Light Welterweight	Martin Ndongo-Ebanga (CMR); L RSC-1	did not advance				
Jeffrey Nedd	Light Heavyweight	Joseph Akhasamba (KEN); L RSC-2	did not advance				

== Fencing ==
One male fencer represented Aruba in 1988.

=== Men ===
==== Individual ====
Athlete	Event	Elimination Round	Round I	Repechage Round I	Round II	Repechage Round II	Round III	Repechage Round III	Round IV	Quarterfinal	Semifinal	Final / BM	
Athlete	Event	Opposition Score	Opposition Score	Opposition Score	Opposition Score	Opposition Score	Opposition Score	Opposition Score	Opposition Score	Opposition Score	Opposition Score	Opposition Score	Rank
Austin Thomas	Individual épée	70	did not advance										
Austin Thomas	Individual foil	58	did not advance										

== Judo ==
Men

Athlete	Event	Preliminary	Round of 32	Round of 16	Quarterfinals	Semifinals	Repechage 1	Repechage 2	Repechage 3	Final / BM	
Athlete	Event	Opposition Result	Opposition Result	Opposition Result	Opposition Result	Opposition Result	Opposition Result	Opposition Result	Opposition Result	Opposition Result	Rank
Victor Maduro	−86 kg	BYE	Heng-An Chiu (TPE); L 0000-0100	did not advance							

== Synchronized swimming ==
Two synchronized swimmers represented Aruba in 1988.

Women

Athlete	Event	Figures		Preliminaries				Final			
Athlete	Event	Total	Rank	Technical	Free	Total	Rank	Technical	Free	Total	Rank
Roswitha Lopez	Women's solo	70.483	45 q	70.483	80.200	150.683	18	did not advance			
Yvette Thuis	Women's solo	74.266	43	did not advance							
Roswitha Lopez; Yvette Thuis	Women's duet	72.375	15 q	72.375	79.600	151.975	15	did not advance			
