= Nicole van der Velden =

Spanish-Aruban sailor (born 1994)

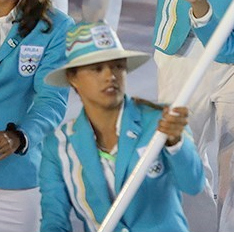
- Van der Velden at the 2016 Olympics

Personal information
- Born: 26 October 1994 (age 31) Madrid, Spain
- Height: 168 cm (5 ft 6 in)
- Weight: 62 kg (137 lb)

Sailing career
- Sport: Sailing
- Club: Aruba Beach Cats
- Coached by: Pim Nieuwenhuis

Nicole van der Velden (born 26 October 1994 in Madrid) is a Spanish-Aruban sailor. She was born Aruban, but received the Spanish nationality by the Spanish government in 2019. She competed at the 2016 Summer Olympics in the Nacra 17 race with Thijs Visser; they won two races and placed 16th in the final standings. She was the flag bearer for Aruba in the Parade of Nations. She campaigned a 49er FX towards the 2020 Tokyo Olympic Games and is presently campaigning an IQ Foil windsurfer towards the 2024 Olympic Games.

Originally from Noord, Aruba, Van Der Velden was born in Madrid to a Dutch father and a Venezuelan mother. She took up sailing in 2008 following her father, Martin, who worked as a technical officer with the Aruba Sailing Association. She speaks four languages fluently: Papiamento, Dutch, Spanish and English.

Olympic Games
| Preceded by Jemal Le Grand | Flagbearer for Aruba; Rio 2016 | Succeeded by Allyson Ponson; Mikel Schreuders |
