= Thijs Visser =

Aruban sailor (born 1989)

Thijs Visser (born October 19, 1989) is an Aruban sailor. He competed at the 2016 Summer Olympics in the Nacra 17 race with Nicole van der Velden; the two placed 16th.
