= Joe Mahit =

Vanuatuan judoka

Personal information
- Nationality: Vanuatuan
- Born: 17 July 1992 (age 33)
- Occupation: Judoka
- Height: 1.7 m (5 ft 7 in)
- Weight: 66 kg (146 lb)

Sport
- Sport: Judo

Profile at external databases
- IJF: 10777
- JudoInside.com: 20047

Joe Mahit (born 17 July 1992) is a Vanuatuan judoka.

He competed at the 2016 Summer Olympics in Rio de Janeiro, in the men's 66 kg but lost to Jayme Mata in the second round.
