= Davy Bisslik =

Aruban swimmer (born 1982)

Personal information
- Full name: Davy Rolando Bisslik
- Born: March 26, 1982 (age 44)

Sport
- Sport: Swimming

Davy Rolando Bisslik (born 26 March 1982 in Savaneta, Aruba) is an Olympic swimmer from Aruba. He has swum for Aruba at the:

- Olympics: 2000, 2004
- World Championships: 2001, 2003
- Pan American Games: 2003

Bisslik attended Colegio Arubano and later went to The College of New Jersey (TCNJ) to study computer science. In 2003, he swam for TCNJ, earning an All-American award in the 200-yard freestyle relay and six All-Conference awards. Bisslik was a member of the team that held TCNJ's record in the 200-yard medley relay.
