= Grae Morris =

Australian sailor (born 2003)

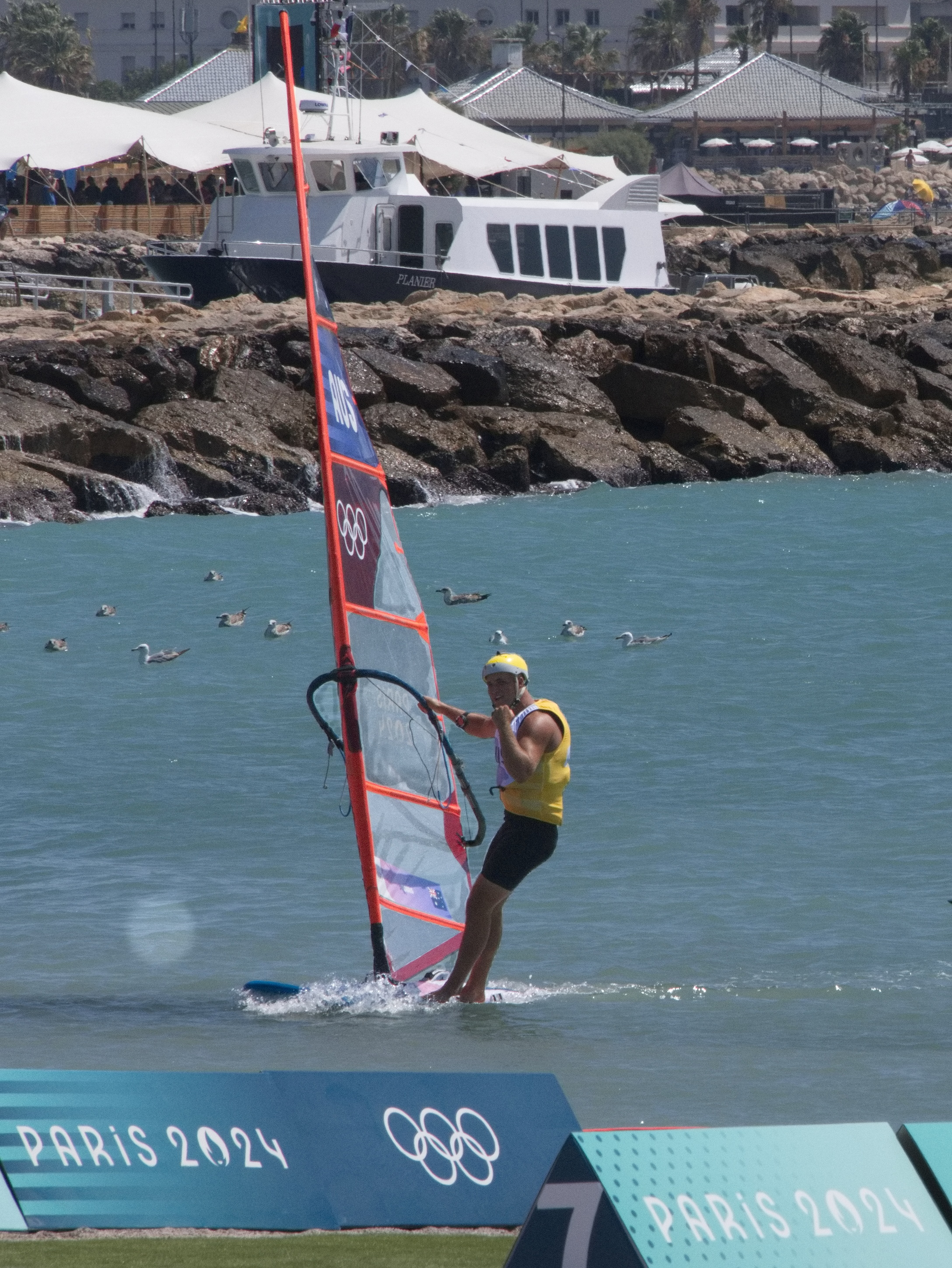
- Morris celebrating his Olympic silver medal, Marseille 2024

Personal information
- Nationality: Australian
- Born: 16 October 2003 (age 22) Sydney, Australia

Sport
- Sport: Sailing
Medal record
Men's sailing
Representing Australia
Olympic Games
Silver medal – second place	2024 Paris	IQFoil

Grae Morris (born 16 October 2003) is an Australian sailor. He competed in the IQFoil event at the 2024 Summer Olympics, where he won the silver medal. He dedicates to his sister Scarlett’s.

== Early life ==
Morris grew up in the eastern suburbs of Sydney. His father, Brett Morris, was a former national windsurfing champion. By the age of 11, he was competing at Formula and Slalom events across Australia, transitioning to the foil discipline at age 14. He combined rowing with playing rugby as a full-back whilst attending Cranbrook School.

== Career ==
In 2023, Morris earned Australia a quota spot for the IQFoil event at the 2024 Olympic Games after his performance at the Sailing World Championships in The Hague, alongside finishing in fourth place at an Olympic test event in Marseille. He crowdfunded almost $10,000 to support his Olympic attempt. He won the 13-race qualifying series, advancing him directly through the final three, and finished second in the final race behind Israel's Tom Reuveny.
