= Lucien Dirksz =

Aruban cyclist (born 1968)

Personal information
- Born: 29 September 1968 (age 58)

Cycling career
- Sport: Cycling

Lucien Pedro Lodevicus Dirksz (born 29 September 1968) is an Aruban former cyclist. He competed at the 1992 Summer Olympics and the 1996 Summer Olympics. During the 1992 Summer Olympics opening ceremony, Dirksz was the flag bearer for Aruba.

Records
Olympic Games
Preceded by Bito Maduro	Flagbearer for Aruba; Barcelona 1992	Succeeded by Junior Faro
