= Allyson Ponson =

Aruban swimmer (born 1995)

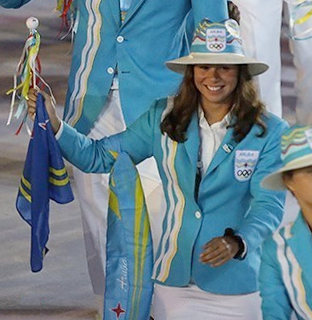
- Ponson at the 2016 Olympics

Personal information
- Nationality: Aruban
- Born: 4 December 1995 (age 30)
- Height: 165 cm (5 ft 5 in)

Sport
- Sport: Swimming
- Club: Stingray Swimming Team
- Coached by: Valerie Eman; Ismael Santiesteban

Allyson Roxanne Ponson (born 4 December 1995) is an Aruban swimmer. She holds the national record in 50 and 100 metre freestyle and 50 metre backstroke. In 2011, she was named Aruban Athlete of the Year. She placed 45th in the 50 metre freestyle event at the 2016 Summer Olympics held in Rio de Janeiro, Brazil.

Ponson studied at the Fontys University of Applied Sciences in Eindhoven, the Netherlands, and in 2015 competed for the Dutch club PSV. Her sister Gabrielle is also an international swimmer.

In 2019, she represented Aruba at the 2019 World Aquatics Championships held in Gwangju, South Korea. She competed in the women's 50 metre freestyle and women's 100 metre freestyle events. In both events she did not advance to compete in the semi-finals.

In 2021, she competed in the women's 50 metre freestyle event at the 2020 Summer Olympics held in Tokyo, Japan. She was also one of two flag bearers for Aruba at the opening ceremony.

Olympic Games
Preceded by Nicole van der Velden	Flagbearer for Aruba; Tokyo 2020 with Mikel Schreuders	Succeeded by Chloë Farro; Mikel Schreuders
