= Fiderd Vis =

Aruban Olympic judoka (born 1981)

Personal information
- Born: 29 March 1981 (age 43)
- Occupation: Judoka

Sport
- Sport: Judo

Fiderd Vis (born March 29, 1981) is a judoka from Aruba. He competed in the 2008 Summer Olympics in Beijing, China, and was the flag-bearer for his nation during the opening ceremonies of those games.

Olympic Games
Preceded by Roshendra Vrolijk	Flagbearer for Aruba; Beijing 2008	Succeeded by Jemal Le Grand
