= Roger Jurriens =

Aruban sailor (born 1965)

Personal information
- Full name: Roger André Jurriens
- Nationality: Aruba
- Born: 29 December 1965 (age 60)

Sailing career
- Sport: Sailing
- Class: Lechner

Roger André Jurriens (born 29 December 1965) is a sailor who competed internationally for Aruba in the windsurfing event at the 1992 Summer Olympics.

== Career ==
Jurriens competed at the 1992 Summer Olympics in the Lechner A-390 windsurfing event. They competed in 10 races, and in the end Jurriens finished in 37th place out of 45 starters.
