= Jemal Le Grand =

Aruban swimmer (born 1994)

Personal information
- Full name: Jemal Emmanuel Le Grand
- Nationality: Aruba
- Born: June 30, 1994 (age 32) Oranjestad, Aruba
- Height: 1.80 m (5 ft 11 in)
- Weight: 75 kg (165 lb)

Sport
- Sport: Swimming
- Strokes: Freestyle
- College team: Florida State University
Medal record
Men's swimming
Representing Aruba

Jemal Emmanuel Le Grand (born 30 June 1994 in Oranjestad) is an Aruban swimmer who competed in the 2012 Summer Olympics – Men's 100m freestyle. He was Aruba's flag bearer at the 2012 Summer Olympics. He also competed at the 2013 World Aquatics Championships.

Jemal lives in the United States.

Olympic Games
Preceded by Fiderd Vis	Flagbearer for Aruba; London 2012	Succeeded by Nicole van der Velden
