= Jayme Mata =

Aruban Olympic judoka (born 1982)

Personal information
- Born: 17 December 1982 (age 43)
- Occupation: Judoka

Sport
- Sport: Judo

Profile at external databases
- IJF: 940
- JudoInside.com: 58960

Jayme Lee Mata (born 17 December 1982 in Oranjestad, Aruba) is an Aruban judoka. At the 2012 Summer Olympics he competed in the Men's 66 kg, but was defeated in the second round by Sugoi Uriarte. At the 2016 Summer Olympics, Mata won his first Olympic match by defeating Joe Mahit in the second round of the Men's 66 kg but lost to Rishod Sobirov in the third round. He lives in Arnhem, the Netherlands.
