= Philip Elhage =

Aruban sport shooter (born 1982)

Personal information
- Citizenship: Dutch
- Born: 11 April 1982 (age 44) Willemstad, Netherlands Antilles
- Height: 1.72 m (5 ft 8 in)
- Weight: 65 kg (143 lb)

Sport
- Country: Aruba
- Sport: Shooting
- Event: 10 m air pistol (AP60)
- Club: Trigger Shooting Club
- Coached by: Shaheen Elhage

Philip Yousef Elhage (born 11 April 1982) is a sport shooter. Born in Curaçao, he competes internationally for Aruba. Elhage represented the Netherlands Antilles at the 2008 Summer Olympics in Beijing, where he competed in the men's 10 m air pistol. He finished only in forty-sixth place by two points behind Turkey's Yusuf Dikeç from the fourth attempt, for a total score of 566 targets. Elhage represented Aruba at the 2020 Summer Olympics in Tokyo. He competed in the men's 10 metre air pistol qualification round on 24 July, where he shot 556 points resulting in 35th place and failing to qualify to the final.
