= Ethan Westera =

Aruban sailor (born 1997)

Ethan Westera OLY
Personal information
- Born: 3 October 1997 (age 29) Oranjestad, Aruba

Sailing career
- Sport: Sailing
Medal record
Representing Aruba
| Silver medal – second place | 2023 Pan American Games | Men's iQFoil |

Ethan Westera (born 3 October 1997, in Oranjestad) is an Aruban sailor. He competed in the Men's iQFoil event at the 2024 Summer Olympics. He competed in the 2023 Pan American Games and got 2nd on Men's iQFoil. He was the closing ceremony flag bearer for Aruba at the 2024 Summer Olympics.
