= Richard Rodriguez (athlete) =

Aruban long-distance runner (born 1969)

Richard Florentin Rodriguez (born 10 December 1969) is a former Aruban long-distance runner who competed in the 2000 Summer Olympics, running in the marathon competition. He did not finish.

Records
Olympic Games
Preceded by Junior Faro	Flagbearer for Aruba; Sydney 2000	Succeeded by Roshendra Vrolijk
