= Roshendra Vrolijk =

Aruban swimmer

Personal information
- Full name: Roshendra Julienne Mercedes; Vrolijk
- National team: Aruba
- Born: 3 November 1984 (age 41) Oranjestad, Netherlands Antilles (present-day Aruba)
- Height: 1.71 m (5 ft 7 in)
- Weight: 56 kg (123 lb)

Sport
- Sport: Swimming
- Strokes: Freestyle

Roshendra Julienne Mercedes Vrolijk (born November 3, 1984) is an Aruban former swimmer, who specialized in sprint freestyle events. She is one of Aruba's first Olympic swimmers, alongside Davy Bisslik, and also a two-time Olympian (2000 and 2004).

Vrolijk made her Olympic debut, as Aruba's youngest athlete (aged 15), at the 2000 Summer Olympics in Sydney, where she competed in the women's 50 m freestyle. Swimming in heat three, she edged out Armenia's Yuliana Mikheeva to pick up a sixth seed and sixty-second overall by 0.49 of a second in 29.31.

In 2003, Vrolijk competed in eight events at the Swimming at the 2003 World Aquatics Championships held in Barcelona, Spain, her highest finish out of her eight events was 42nd in the 200 metres breaststroke, and she won her heat in the 50 metres breaststroke but it still wasn't fast enough to qualify for the next round. The next month she swam at the 2003 Pan American Games held in Santo Domingo, Dominican Republic, she competed in the 50 metres freestyle where she finished in 23rd place out of 26 starters.

At the 2004 Summer Olympics in Athens, Vrolijk was elected by the Aruban Olympic Committee to become the nation's first ever female flag bearer in the opening ceremony. She qualified again for the 50 m freestyle by receiving a Universality place from FINA, in an entry time of 28.13. Swimming in heat four, she raced to a third spot by three hundredths of a second (0.03) behind Moldova's Maria Tregubova in 28.43. Vrolijk failed to advance into the semifinals, as she placed forty-ninth overall out of 75 swimmers on the last day of preliminaries.

Olympic Games
Preceded by Richard Rodriguez	Flagbearer for Aruba; Athens 2004	Succeeded by Fiderd Vis
