= Junior Faro =

Aruban weightlifter (born 1978)

Isnardo Faro
Personal information
- Born: 15 July 1978 (age 46)
- Height: 1.71 m (5 ft 7 in)

Sport
- Sport: Weightlifting

Isnardo Enrike "Junior" Faro (born 15 July 1978) is a weightlifter who competed at two Summer Olympics for Aruba.

== Career ==
Aged 18 years old Faro went to Atlanta, United States to compete in the 1996 Summer Olympics, he entered the middleweight division and he finished 21st out of the 24 starters. Eight years later he competed at the 2004 Summer Olympics held in Athens, Greece, this time he was competing in the middle-heavyweight division, this time he finished 19th out of the 25 lifters that started the event.

Records
Olympic Games
Preceded by Lucien Dirksz	Flagbearer for Aruba; Atlanta 1996	Succeeded by Richard Rodriguez
