= Chloë Farro =

Aruban swimmer (born 2003)

Chloë Farro OLY
Personal information
- National team: Aruba
- Born: 19 June 2003 (age 23) Savaneta, Aruba

Sport
- Sport: Swimming
- College team: Indiana State Sycamores

Chloë Farro (born 19 June 2003) is an Aruban swimmer. She qualified to represent Aruba at the 2024 Summer Olympics and was chosen the Aruban flag bearer.

== Biography ==
Farro was born on 19 June 2003 in Savaneta, Aruba. She grew up in Aruba and swam at an early age for the Aruba Dolphins Swim Club, stating aged 12 that she made it her goal to represent Aruba at the Summer Olympic Games. She also practiced ballet, but decided to focus full-time on swimming by age 14. She represented Aruba in international competitions at a young age; she won a bronze medal at the CCCAN Swimming Championships in 2018, competed in four events at the 2019 FINA World Junior Swimming Championships and participated at the UANA Swimming Cup in February 2020, winning a bronze medal.

In July 2020, Farro announced her commitment to attend college in the U.S. at Indiana State University (ISU) and swim for the Indiana State Sycamores. She arrived in the U.S. for the fall semester at ISU in 2021. In her first season with the Indiana State swim team, 2021–22, she set a school record in the 100 freestyle event. The following season, she was named a Missouri Valley Conference (MVC) Scholar-Athlete and was selected honorable mention All-MVC while being a member of relay teams setting three ISU records. She repeated as a member of the MVC Scholar-Athlete team in 2023–24 and was named honorable mention All-MVC for the second year.

Internationally, Farro represented Aruba at the 2021 Junior Pan American Games, 2021 FINA Short Course World Swimming Championships, 2022 Fina World Swimming Championships, and at the 2023 World Aquatics Championships. She was the recipient of an Olympic scholarship in 2022 to help provide financial support for her career. In June 2024, she was selected to represent Aruba at the 2024 Summer Olympics in the 50m freestyle event. Later in July, she was announced as the Aruban flag bearer at the Olympics opening ceremony.
