= Mikel Schreuders =

Aruban swimmer (born 1998)

Mikel Schreuders OLY
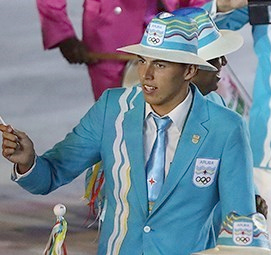
- Schreuders at the 2016 Olympics

Personal information
- Born: 21 September 1998 (age 28) Oranjestad, Aruba
- Height: 1.89 m (6 ft 2 in)
- Weight: 90 kg (198 lb)

Sport
- Sport: Swimming
- College team: Missouri Tigers
- Club: Cercle Nageur Marseille
- Turned pro: 2022
- Coached by: julian Jacquier (CN Marseille) / Andy grevers(Missouri); Ismael Santiesteban (Stingray)

Achievements and titles
- Olympic finals: 2016 Rio de Janeiro
- World finals: 2015 FINA World Championships, 2017 FINA Worldchampionships
Medal record
Men's swimming
Representing Aruba
Central American and Caribbean Games
Gold medal – first place	2023 San Salvador	50 m breaststroke
Silver medal – second place	2018 Barranquilla	100 m freestyle
Silver medal – second place	2023 San Salvador	50 m freestyle
Silver medal – second place	2023 San Salvador	100 m freestyle
Silver medal – second place	2023 San Salvador	50 m butterfly
Bronze medal – third place	2018 Barranquilla	200 m freestyle

Mikel Cristoph Schreuders (born 21 September 1998) is an Aruban swimmer. He placed 45th in the 200 metre freestyle event at the 2016 Summer Olympics. He also competed at the 2020 Summer Olympics and the 2024 Summer Olympics.

== College career ==
Schreuders competed for the University of Missouri. He won the 2018 SEC title in the 200-yard freestyle. He finished eighth at the 2018 NCAA Championships in the same event.

Olympic Games
Preceded by Nicole van der Velden	Flagbearer for Aruba; Tokyo 2020 with Allyson Ponson; Paris 2024 with Chloë Farro	Succeeded by Incumbent
