= Aruban Olympic Committee =

National Olympic Committee

- Country/Region: Aruba
- Code: ARU
- Created: 1985
- Recognized: 1986
- Continental Association: PASO
- Headquarters: Oranjestad
- President: Edwin Roos
- Secretary General: Nicole Hoevertsz
- Website: www.olympicaruba.com

The Aruban Olympic Committee (Papiamento: Comité Olímpico Arubano) was established in 1985 after Aruba separated from the Netherlands Antilles. Previously, Aruba was represented by the Netherlands Antilles Olympic Committee (NAOC). It received recognition the following year from the International Olympic Committee (IOC).

== History ==
From their establishment in 1985, the organisation had their headquarters in the national Trinidad Stadium. The team outgrew their quarters and in 2023 they moved to a new building at the nearby Vondellaan. Thomas Bach, President of the International Olympic Committee, had the honour to open the facility.

== Olympic competitions ==
Aruba first competed at the 1988 Summer Olympics and has participated in each Summer Olympic Games since then. Aruba has not competed in any Winter Olympic Games. Aruba has yet to win any Olympic medals.
