= 2011 ISAF Sailing World Championships – Laser Radial =

International sailing competition held in Australia

Laser Radial at the 2011 ISAF Sailing World Championships
- Venue: Perth, Western Australia
- Dates: 5–11 December
- Competitors: 102 from 51 nations

Medalists
gold medal	Marit Bouwmeester	Netherlands
silver medal	Evi Van Acker	Belgium
bronze medal	Paige Railey	United States

The Laser Radial class at the 2011 ISAF Sailing World Championships was held in Perth, Western Australia between 5 and 11 December 2011.

== Results ==
Results of individual races
Pos	Helmsman	Country	I	II	III	IV	V	VI	VII	VIII	IX	X	MR	Tot	Pts
Gold medal	Marit Bouwmeester	Netherlands	3	2	10	2	1	13^{†}	5	6	7	5	8	62	49
Silver medal	Evi Van Acker	Belgium	1	1	4	2	2	3	19^{†}	2	13	19	6	72	53
Bronze medal	Paige Railey	United States	8	2	10	3	3	1	6	10	10	12^{†}	18	83	71
4	Veronika Fenclová	Czech Republic	1	3	3	10	13	19	11	28^{†}	6	4	2	100	72
5	Gintarė Scheidt	Lithuania	8	4	7	12	17	5	1	20^{†}	2	10	10	96	76
6	Annalise Murphy	Ireland	30	1	2	1	4	37^{†}	17	4	1	1	16	114	77
7	Alison Young	Great Britain	14	8	2	4	1	27^{†}	22	12	8	3	12	113	86
8	Tatiana Drozdovskaya	Belarus	2	12	8	5	6	11	18	19^{†}	5	17	14	117	98
9	Sari Multala	Finland	29	13	1	1	5	24	12	3	31^{†}	18	4	141	110
10	Sara Winther	New Zealand	7	6	22	8	5	4	26^{†}	15	15	15	DSQ 22	145	119
11	Tuula Tenkanen	Finland	22	5	11	8	4	8	10	16	23	27^{†}	–	134	107
12	Nathalie Brugger	Switzerland	13	20	9	11	9	16	31^{†}	17	3	11	–	140	109
13	Josefin Olsson	Sweden	35	17	4	4	8	15	46^{†}	5	11	14	–	159	113
14	Hannah Snellgrove	Great Britain	23	20	15	7	3	36^{†}	21	1	17	8	–	151	115
15	Anne-Marie Rindom	Denmark	9	7	21	12	11	28^{†}	16	8	27	13	–	152	124
16	Charlotte Dobson	Great Britain	34	14	1	3	23	23	42^{†}	7	18	6	–	171	129
17	Claire Blom	Netherlands	20	25	9	6	2	22	13	21	12	26^{†}	–	156	130
18	Lisa Fasselt	Germany	9	15	7	13	8	40^{†}	23	22	19	16	–	172	132
19	Krystal Weir	Australia	6	17	17	5	12	DNF 52^{†}	33	13	29	2	–	186	134
20	Maiken Foght Schütt	Denmark	2	9	13	18	13	29	44^{†}	30	9	20	–	187	143
21	Sophie de Turckheim	France	7	11	12	7	7	17	40^{†}	34	32	23	–	190	150
22	Sarah Steyaert	France	4	13	25	13	19	6	25	23	25	29^{†}	–	182	153
23	Andrea Brewster	Great Britain	19	10	34	21	16	7	9	48^{†}	36	7	–	207	159
24	Francesca Clapcich	Italy	37	21	5	19	6	21	7	41^{†}	22	30	–	209	168
25	Xu Lijia	China	BFD 52^{†}	DSQ 52	11	9	9	2	2	26	BFD 52	9	–	224	172
26	Chloe Martin	Great Britain	28	15	24	18	21	25	4	33	4	49^{†}	–	221	172
27	Alicia Cebrián	Spain	16	8	24	9	10	43^{†}	27	25	28	25	–	215	172
28	Alberte Holm Lindberg	Denmark	4	21	21	14	15	10	37^{†}	24	33	31	–	210	173
29	Sarah Gunni Toftedal	Denmark	19	9	14	24	14	42^{†}	38	9	16	33	–	218	176
30	Lucia Reyes	Spain	21	28	28	28	7	31	3	11	20	47^{†}	–	224	177
31	Cecilia Carranza	Argentina	28	10	23	20	20	26	15	18	30^{†}	24	–	214	184
32	Tina Mihelić	Croatia	BFD 52^{†}	3	16	17	29	20	30	14	42	28	–	251	199
33	Alex South	Australia	5	23	18	6	28	9	DNF 52^{†}	44	45	22	–	252	200
34	Michelle Broekhuizen	Netherlands	17	12	14	20	15	14	34	50^{†}	41	35	–	252	202
35	Tania Elías Calles	Mexico	21	5	8	26	11	44	14	45^{†}	38	40	–	252	207
36	Isabella Bertold	Canada	14	18	18	16	18	38	20	27	44^{†}	38	–	251	207
37	Heidi Tenkanen	Finland	23	14	20	11	22	12	43^{†}	35	40	32	–	252	209
38	Miranda Powrie	New Zealand	26	33	6	15	10	45	8	32	39	48^{†}	–	262	214
39	Franziska Goltz	Germany	30	7	16	22	14	39	39	29	26	45^{†}	–	267	222
40	Danielle Dube	Canada	13	16	17	16	25	41	24	40	34	42^{†}	–	268	226
41	Adriana Kostiw	Brazil	15	32	15	29	19	48^{†}	47	43	14	21	–	283	235
42	Gabrielle King	Australia	32	11	20	19	20	35	32	31	43^{†}	39	–	282	239
43	Nufar Edelman	Israel	22	16	28	21	22	34	28	46^{†}	35	36	–	288	242
44	Nazlı Çağla Dönertaş	Turkey	11	6	12	22	27	49^{†}	49	37	37	44	–	294	245
45	Rachel Claire Merry	Canada	12	25	5	15	12	32	45	51	DNF 52^{†}	50	–	299	247
46	Erika Reineke	United States	11	22	22	27	21	18	35	47	49^{†}	46	–	298	249
47	Zhou Daiqing	China	15	19	19	27	26	46^{†}	29	38	46	34	–	299	253
48	Fatima Reyes	Spain	BFD 52^{†}	4	6	DSQ 52	17	30	36	42	24	43	–	306	254
49	Ashley Stoddart	Australia	42	35	3	10	18	33	41	36	48^{†}	37	–	303	255
50	Manon Luther	Switzerland	12	26	19	17	23	47	50^{†}	49	21	41	–	305	255
51	Ingrid Merry	Canada	17	28	13	23	25	50	48	39	47	51^{†}	–	341	290
52	Lisa Ross	Canada	32^{†}	30	26	14	16	9	2	14	4	1	–	148	116
53	Elizabeth Yin	Singapore	10	24	27	35^{†}	30	11	4	1	8	5	–	155	120
54	Sara Carmo	Portugal	BFD 52^{†}	23	27	23	26	7	5	12	9	18	–	202	150
55	Rachel Basevi	New Zealand	3	42	23	26	34	1	8	DNS 52^{†}	6	13	–	208	156
56	Aušra Milevičiūtė	Lithuania	10	29	32	29	34^{†}	5	15	16	12	14	–	196	162
57	Kanako Hiruta	Japan	18	26	42^{†}	25	27	25	18	3	19	11	–	214	172
58	Marthe Enger Eide	Norway	25	22	43	30	24	18	6	4	1	OCS 52^{†}	–	225	173
59	Brenda Bowskill	Canada	38	37	40^{†}	30	24	12	11	7	13	3	–	215	175
60	Kristine Strandenes	Norway	40	19	37	32	35	2	BFD 52^{†}	6	5	4	–	232	180
61	Fina Kuikka	Sweden	26	32	45	25	28	6	1	8	10	OCS 52^{†}	–	233	181
62	Beth Lygoe	Saint Lucia	46^{†}	29	34	24	31	35	10	5	11	8	–	233	187
63	Andrea Aldana	Guatemala	40^{†}	33	39	36	31	26	9	20	2	2	–	238	198
64	Anna Agrafioti	Greece	43	27	29	33	32	44^{†}	3	10	15	7	–	243	199
65	Svetlana Shintiko	Russia	20	30	38	28	42^{†}	23	16	25	7	12	–	241	199
66	Anke Helbig	Germany	6	18	33	34	37	19	BFD 52^{†}	2	3	DNC 52	–	256	204
67	Victoria Jing Hua Chan	Singapore	29	27	37	41	44^{†}	3	7	22	23	19	–	252	208
68	Paloma Schmidt	Peru	33	31	29	37	30	40^{†}	34	13	20	6	–	273	233
69	Andrea Foglia	Uruguay	16	24	35	31	38^{†}	22	21	30	31	23	–	271	233
70	Yevgeniya Kuznetsova	Russia	18	41	25	33	33	30	19	9	29	DNC 52^{†}	–	289	237
71	Kaori Takahashi	Japan	24	39	30	34	41^{†}	24	20	11	30	26	–	279	238
72	Daniela Rivera	Venezuela	BFD 52^{†}	34	35	32	38	15	40	15	14	17	–	292	240
73	Satoko Hasegawa	Japan	47^{†}	34	31	38	32	17	12	21	24	34	–	290	243
74	Paulina Barwinska	Poland	25	41^{†}	40	39	35	14	17	18	34	30	–	293	252
75	Anna Aile	Latvia	38	48^{†}	45	36	29	32	24	19	18	16	–	305	257
76	Anne-Mari Luik	Estonia	45^{†}	44	30	37	33	36	25	29	16	9	–	304	259
77	Erin Rafuse	Canada	34	37	39	31	43	49^{†}	33	17	22	10	–	315	266
78	Zhang Dongshuang	China	36	42	33	46	48^{†}	8	28	24	36	15	–	316	268
79	Caitlin Elks	Australia	31	35	26	39	41	43^{†}	14	37	17	28	–	311	268
80	Lee Gyeong Jin	South Korea	27	36	38	42	42	16	13	28	33	OCS 52^{†}	–	327	275
81	Anna Pohlak	Estonia	39	46	50^{†}	45	36	4	26	23	41	21	–	331	281
82	Odile Ginaid	Brazil	31	39	41	43^{†}	36	34	22	27	25	27	–	325	282
83	Philipine van Aanholt	Netherlands Antilles	24	40	41	38	40	10	30	40	45^{†}	37	–	345	300
84	Wu Tong	China	5	47	48^{†}	40	40	28	37	35	40	31	–	351	303
85	Helema Williams	Cook Islands	39	48^{†}	31	44	46	29	32	33	21	29	–	352	304
86	Constanze Stolz	Germany	42	38	36	43	45^{†}	27	41	26	28	24	–	350	305
87	Mayumi Roller	U.S. Virgin Islands	27	31	47^{†}	42	45	39	29	36	26	33	–	355	308
88	Rohini Rau	India	41	40	36	35	37	47^{†}	31	32	35	22	–	356	309
89	Milica Dukic	Serbia	OCS 52^{†}	36	46	44	46	20	35	31	32	32	–	374	322
90	Mónica Azón	Spain	37	46	48^{†}	40	47	13	27	39	43	35	–	375	327
91	Maja Podesta	Malta	45	50^{†}	32	45	39	46	36	38	27	20	–	378	328
92	Sayoko Harada	Japan	BFD 52^{†}	45	44	41	39	42	23	34	37	36	–	393	341
93	Kamolwan Chanyim	Thailand	33	43	47	49^{†}	43	21	38	42	38	38	–	392	343
94	Jessica Ann Deary	South Africa	36	43	43	48^{†}	48	48	42	43	44	25	–	420	372
95	Catherine Shanahan	United States	41	45	46	46	44	37	39	41	39	OCS 52^{†}	–	430	378
96	Laura Cosentino	Italy	35	38	42	47	RAF 52^{†}	31	43	DNS 52	42	DNC 52	–	434	382
97	Khairunneeta Mohd Afendy	Malaysia	44	44	49^{†}	49	47	33	48	46	47	39	–	446	397
98	Laura Marimon Giocannetti	Italy	44	49^{†}	44	48	49	41	45	44	49	41	–	454	405
99	Nur Amirah Hamid	Malaysia	43	49	51^{†}	51	50	38	46	49	50	43	–	470	419
100	Park Da-som	South Korea	48	50	51^{†}	47	50	51	44	45	46	42	–	474	423
101	Patricia Gatti	Brazil	50^{†}	47	49	50	49	50	47	47	48	40	–	477	427
102	Viktoria Hejj	Hungary	49	51^{†}	50	50	51	45	49	48	51	44	–	488	437

Legend: – Qualified for medal race(s); BFD – Black flag disqualification; DNC – Did not come to the starting area; DNF – Did not finish; DNS – Did not start; DSQ – Disqualified; OCS – On the course side of the starting line; RAF – Retired after finishing; † – Discarded race not counted in the overall result;
