= 2014 ISAF Sailing World Championships – Laser Radial =

International sailing competition held in Spain

Laser Radial at the 2014 ISAF Sailing World Championships
- Venue: Santander, Spain
- Dates: 12–18 September
- Competitors: 120 from 54 nations

Medalists
gold medal	Marit Bouwmeester	Netherlands
silver medal	Josefin Olsson	Sweden
bronze medal	Evi Van Acker	Belgium

The women's Laser Radial class at the 2014 ISAF Sailing World Championships was held in Santander, Spain 12–18 September.

== Results ==
Results of individual races
Pos	Helmsman	Country	I	II	III	IV	V	VI	VII	MR	Tot	Pts
Gold medal	Marit Bouwmeester	Netherlands	8	1	2	7	8	1	12^{†}	6	45	33
Silver medal	Josefin Olsson	Sweden	2	16^{†}	8	5	2	13	7	12	65	49
Bronze medal	Evi Van Acker	Belgium	15	7	1	14	25^{†}	2	1	16	81	56
4	Tuula Tenkanen	Finland	20^{†}	2	3	10	15	8	11	8	77	57
5	Veronika Kozelska Fenclova	Czech Republic	3	1	12	3	30^{†}	3	15	20	87	57
6	Tina Mihelić	Croatia	10	9	7	39^{†}	17	12	9	2	105	66
7	Anne-Marie Rindom	Denmark	14	7	16^{†}	12	12	15	2	4	82	66
8	Mathilde de Kerangat	France	27^{†}	15	6	3	18	14	16	10	109	82
9	Alison Young	Great Britain	13	12	36^{†}	8	29	4	3	14	119	83
10	Emma Plasschaert	Belgium	2	5	24	5	27	31^{†}	4	18	116	85
11	Sara Winther	New Zealand	7	19	10	13	26^{†}	19	5	–	99	73
12	Marie Bolou	France	50^{†}	8	4	25	7	11	18	–	123	73
13	Zhang Dongshuang	China	5	4	32	1	1	34	50^{†}	–	127	77
14	Erika Reineke	United States	1	31^{†}	9	8	5	28	29	–	111	80
15	Chloe Martin	Great Britain	10	6	4	16	13	32^{†}	32	–	113	81
16	Hannah Snellgrove	Great Britain	9	34	5	17	56^{†}	7	17	–	145	89
17	Silvia Zennaro	Italy	16	3	22	22	3	24	43^{†}	–	133	90
18	Isabella-Anna Bertold	Canada	28	12	11	26	10	40^{†}	10	–	137	97
19	Elizabeth Yin	Singapore	38	28	7	1	16	9	46^{†}	–	145	99
20	Annalise Murphy	Ireland	37	43^{†}	8	7	36	5	13	–	149	106
21	Marthe Eide	Norway	16	5	17	21	19	53^{†}	28	–	159	106
22	Viktorija Andrulytė	Lithuania	11	3	1	4	DSQ 61^{†}	39	51	–	170	109
23	Tatiana Drozdovskaya	Belarus	43^{†}	36	6	15	6	26	21	–	153	110
24	Oren Jacob	Israel	4	24	13	14	43^{†}	35	22	–	155	112
25	Daphne van der Vaart	Netherlands	9	21	19	41^{†}	14	27	24	–	155	114
26	Manami Doi	Japan	6	21	14	44^{†}	34	29	14	–	162	118
27	Pernelle Michon	France	8	17	20	6	45^{†}	37	30	–	163	118
28	Amélie Riou	France	13	30	30	17	38^{†}	23	6	–	157	119
29	Fernanda Decnop	Brazil	33	10	25	9	40^{†}	20	25	–	162	122
30	Brenda Bowskill	Canada	35^{†}	25	14	31	4	22	27	–	158	123
31	Dolores Moreira	Uruguay	21	10	15	18	23	36	60^{†}	–	183	123
32	Joyce Floridia	Italy	5	9	10	20	32	48	58^{†}	–	182	124
33	Svenja Weger	Germany	12	6	28	26	35^{†}	21	33	–	161	126
34	Gintarė Scheidt	Lithuania	BFD 61^{†}	4	21	20	46	30	8	–	190	129
35	Elena Vorobeva	Russia	17	15	37	19	41^{†}	10	31	–	170	129
36	Sarah Gunni Toftedal	Denmark	1	29	22	2	57	BFD 61^{†}	19	–	191	130
37	Ana Zelic	Croatia	31	11	23	23	31	17	54^{†}	–	190	136
38	Nazlı Çağla Dönertaş	Turkey	26	31	33	15	37^{†}	6	26	–	174	137
39	Krystal Weir	Australia	43	22	13	25	55^{†}	16	20	–	194	139
40	Martina Reino	Spain	17	DSQ 61^{†}	23	28	9	25	42	–	205	144
41	Paulina Czubachowska	Poland	20	14	25	2	54^{†}	46	40	–	201	147
42	Vasileia Karachaliou	Greece	6	38	2	37	22	52	57^{†}	–	214	157
43	Niki Blässar	Finland	21	14	5	32	52	55^{†}	34	–	213	158
44	Claire Merry	Canada	36	27	18	9	49^{†}	38	36	–	213	164
45	Tiril Bue	Norway	44^{†}	32	15	6	33	44	35	–	209	165
46	Monika Mikkola	Finland	3	42	30	22	20	50	56^{†}	–	223	167
47	Georgina Povall	Great Britain	34	13	3	34	47^{†}	43	41	–	215	168
48	Alicia Cebrián	Spain	47	28	20	12	44	18	48^{†}	–	217	169
49	Pauline Liebig	Germany	40	47	17	4	58^{†}	41	23	–	230	172
50	Marketa Audyova	Czech Republic	25	13	DSQ 61^{†}	16	24	59	37	–	235	174
51	Susannah Pyatt	New Zealand	18	11	35	UFD 61^{†}	11	57	49	–	242	181
52	Chiara Steinmüller	Germany	46	23	31	19	21	42	55^{†}	–	237	182
53	Min Gu	China	4	2	44	33	UFD 61^{†}	51	53	–	248	187
54	Kanako Hiruta	Japan	32	27	9	36	39	45	47^{†}	–	235	188
55	Andrea Aldana	Guatemala	26	44	18	24	53^{†}	33	45	–	243	190
56	Claire Dennis	United States	15	20	56^{†}	34	28	56	39	–	248	192
57	Paloma Schmidt	Peru	11	8	31	57^{†}	51	54	38	–	250	193
58	Stephanie Devaux-Lovell	Saint Lucia	25	24	12	40	50	49	59^{†}	–	259	200
59	Lucía Falasca	Argentina	33	39	29	11	42	47	52^{†}	–	253	201
60	Daniela Rivera	Venezuela	19	18	28	45	48	58^{†}	44	–	260	202
61	Maud Jayet	Switzerland	30	UFD 61^{†}	29	18	–	–	–	–	138	77
62	Anna Pohlak	Estonia	56^{†}	25	40	13	–	–	–	–	134	78
63	Line Flem Høst	Norway	22	DNF 61^{†}	33	23	–	–	–	–	139	78
64	Maria Cristina Boabaid	Brazil	49	55^{†}	19	11	–	–	–	–	134	79
65	Eva-Maria Schimak	Austria	29	22	41^{†}	29	–	–	–	–	121	80
66	Elejabeitia Alba	Spain	7	23	53	55^{†}	–	–	–	–	138	83
67	Clara Ben-Amor Nunez	Chile	23	16	45	52^{†}	–	–	–	–	136	84
68	Laura Cosentino	Italy	24	20	55^{†}	41	–	–	–	–	140	85
69	Constanze Stolz	Germany	27	40^{†}	26	32	–	–	–	–	125	85
70	Christine Neville	United States	24	38	24	47^{†}	–	–	–	–	133	86
71	Maxime Jonker	Netherlands	12	42	57^{†}	33	–	–	–	–	144	87
72	Anna Philip	Australia	23	35	47^{†}	30	–	–	–	–	135	88
73	Sophie-Marie Ertelt	Germany	55^{†}	34	26	29	–	–	–	–	144	89
74	Lovisa Karlsson	Sweden	30	33	27	49^{†}	–	–	–	–	139	90
75	Natalia Montemayor	Mexico	46^{†}	29	32	30	–	–	–	–	137	91
76	Sofie Slotsgaard	Denmark	53^{†}	46	21	27	–	–	–	–	147	94
77	Milda Eidukevičiūtė	Lithuania	55^{†}	32	11	53	–	–	–	–	151	96
78	Anna Weinzieher	Poland	42	48^{†}	34	21	–	–	–	–	145	97
79	Odile Ginaid	Brazil	14	26	DNE 61	27^{†}	–	–	–	–	128	101
80	Martha Faraguna	Italy	35	26	54^{†}	40	–	–	–	–	155	101
81	Yumiko Tombe	Japan	44^{†}	35	34	35	–	–	–	–	148	104
82	Agata Barwińska	Poland	40	52^{†}	16	50	–	–	–	–	158	106
83	Maria Daniela Rodriguez	Ecuador	31	37	39	47^{†}	–	–	–	–	154	107
84	Kamolwan Chanyim	Thailand	48	19	42	51^{†}	–	–	–	–	160	109
85	Caterina Romero Aguirre	Peru	41	17	52	54^{†}	–	–	–	–	164	110
86	Ellie Cumpsty	Great Britain	54^{†}	18	49	43	–	–	–	–	164	110
87	Pinar Kaynar	Turkey	29	49^{†}	38	44	–	–	–	–	160	111
88	Marie Barrue	France	32	45^{†}	37	42	–	–	–	–	156	111
89	Danielle Maman	Israel	37	51^{†}	36	38	–	–	–	–	162	111
90	Stefani Muzakova	Bulgaria	18	50	51^{†}	46	–	–	–	–	165	114
91	Julia Carlsson	Sweden	45	30	48^{†}	39	–	–	–	–	162	114
92	Alina Fomicheva	Russia	22	58	59^{†}	35	–	–	–	–	174	115
93	Nana Hu	China	57^{†}	36	51	28	–	–	–	–	172	115
94	Satoko Hasegawa	Japan	39	33	46^{†}	43	–	–	–	–	161	115
95	Sandra Lulić	Croatia	53	55^{†}	53	10	–	–	–	–	171	116
96	Anne-Mari Luik	Estonia	45	47^{†}	35	37	–	–	–	–	164	117
97	Kim Pletikos	Slovenia	28	50	42	56^{†}	–	–	–	–	176	120
98	Yajie Wang	China	41	41	38	59^{†}	–	–	–	–	179	120
99	Matilda Akkola	Finland	34	40	48^{†}	48	–	–	–	–	170	122
100	Yekaterina Morgun	Russia	51^{†}	49	44	31	–	–	–	–	175	124
101	Carolina João	Portugal	56^{†}	45	43	36	–	–	–	–	180	124
102	Maja Knezevic	Serbia	58^{†}	51	50	24	–	–	–	–	183	125
103	Khairunneeta Mohd Afendy	Malaysia	54^{†}	37	43	45	–	–	–	–	179	125
104	Rhiannon Massey	Great Britain	50^{†}	41	41	46	–	–	–	–	178	128
105	Kateryna Gumenko	Ukraine	39	44	47	48^{†}	–	–	–	–	178	130
106	Imen Cherif Sahraoui	Algeria	38	39	54	55^{†}	–	–	–	–	186	131
107	Isabella Maegli	Guatemala	42	53^{†}	39	52	–	–	–	–	186	133
108	Alexandra Nightingale	New Zealand	19	58^{†}	58	58	–	–	–	–	193	135
109	Philipine van Aanholt	Aruba	60^{†}	59	27	49	–	–	–	–	195	135
110	Ashley Stoddart	Australia	49	46	46	53^{†}	–	–	–	–	194	141
111	Svetlana Shnitko	Russia	36	54^{†}	52	54	–	–	–	–	196	142
112	Ines Gmati	Tunisia	51^{†}	43	49	50	–	–	–	–	193	142
113	Nuramirah Hamid	Malaysia	52	53^{†}	50	42	–	–	–	–	197	144
114	Catherine Dapeci	Austria	57^{†}	56	40	51	–	–	–	–	204	147
115	Zofia Urbas	Poland	59^{†}	56	56	38	–	–	–	–	209	150
116	Alaiza Mae Belmonte	Philippines	58	52	45	60^{†}	–	–	–	–	215	155
117	Teau Mckenzie	Cook Islands	48	54	55	56^{†}	–	–	–	–	213	157
118	Hulda Lilja Hannesdóttir	Iceland	52	48	59^{†}	58	–	–	–	–	217	158
119	Ksenija Joksimovic	Serbia	47	57^{†}	57	57	–	–	–	–	218	161
120	Rose-Lee Numa	Papua New Guinea	59^{†}	57	58	59	–	–	–	–	233	174

Scoring system: low-point system; Source:
Legend: – Qualified for medal race(s); BFD – Black flag disqualification; DNF – Did not finish; DSQ – Disqualified; RET – Retired; UFD – "U" flag disqualification; † – Discarded race not counted in the overall result;
