= 2017 Laser Radial World Championships =

International sailing competition held in the Netherlands

Event details
- Venue: Medemblik, the Netherlands
- Dates: 1–10 September
- Titles: 2

The 2017 Laser Radial World Championships were held in Medemblik, the Netherlands 19–26 August 2017.

== Results ==
=== Men's Laser Radial ===
As of end of regatta

Results of individual races
Pos	Helmsman	Country	Pts
Gold medal	Marcin Rudawski	Poland	30
Silver medal	Eliot Merceron	Switzerland	41
Bronze medal	Zac Littlewood	Australia	50

=== Women's Laser Radial ===
==== Gold fleet ====
As of end of regatta

Results of individual races
Pos	Helmsman	Country	I	II	III	IV	V	VI	VII	VIII	IX	X	Pts
Gold medal	Marit Bouwmeester	Netherlands	29	27	3	6	1	2	1	1	5	3	22
Silver medal	Evi Van Acker	Belgium	4	3	3	9	2	15	3	3	4	15	31
Bronze medal	Manami Doi	Japan	34	5	7	2	2	5	4	23	13	2	40
4	Mathilde De Kerangat	France	4	9	17	13	6	7	10	4	14	7	60
5	Brenda Bowskill	Canada	1	15	10	8	11	6	45	11	2	16	64
6	Maxime Jonker	Netherlands	23	7	13	4	3	24	10	3	10	18	68
7	Daphne Van Der Vaart	Netherlands	13	36	9	5	16	RET 51	15	2	1	13	74
8	Viktorija Andrulytė	Lithuania	30	18	5	9	4	17	39	7	20	1	81
9	Pauline Liebig	Germany	3	22	2	19	8	DSQ 51	6	5	17	36	82
10	Agata Barwinska	Poland	42	14	12	3	6	5	5	18	21	41	84
11	Svenja Weger	Germany	8	2	31	10	1	1	16	21	29	27	86
12	Sarah Douglas	Canada	19	22	8	10	4	6	34	33	3	19	91
13	Marie Barrue	France	16	6	11	16	15	24	11	12	19	5	92
14	Monika Mikkola	Finland	15	1	14	24	22	12	15	32	12	4	95
15	Tuula Tenkanen	Finland	28	30	4	23	9	11	2	10	RET 51	8	95
16	Dolores Moreira	Uruguay	2	10	15	7	24	8	7	14	34	35	97
17	Emma Plasschaert	Belgium	32	5	12	RET 51	5	4	19	6	30	21	102
18	Maud Jayet	Switzerland	5	42	10	30	10	12	1	42	16	20	104
19	Isabella Bertold	Canada	1	25	23	2	15	16	23	26	6	42	111
20	Mária Érdi	Hungary	9	3	32	12	7	17	8	9	RET 51	46	111
21	Anne-Marie Rindom	Denmark	24	19	19	4	3	4	RET 51	8	42	31	112
22	Kim Pletikos	Slovenia	3	2	29	14	23	30	32	27	7	11	116
23	Georgina Povall	Great Britain	14	13	35	18	21	11	17	13	40	9	116
24	Maité Carlier	Belgium	11	4	26	36	13	14	9	25	15	28	117
25	Nazlı Çağla Dönertaş	Turkey	21	47	8	15	12	10	11	19	23	32	119
26	Hannah Snellgrove	Great Britain	31	24	6	18	12	9	5	10	38	37	121
27	Vasileia Karachaliou	Greece	5	13	11	20	19	UFD 51	DSQ 51	15	33	6	122
28	Josefin Olsson	Sweden	20	33	1	13	18	3	21	16	35	34	126
29	Erika Reineke	United States	27	10	16	19	RET 51	7	3	13	37	33	128
30	Silvia Zennaro	Italy	10	14	34	32	5	15	14	6	32	40	128
31	Marie Bolou	France	14	7	20	26	14	21	22	5	28	25	128
32	Athanasia Fakidi	Greece	7	DSQ 51	44	7	25	18	18	19	25	17	136
33	Alison Young	Great Britain	22	11	25	UFD 51	13	1	30	12	41	23	137
34	Mirthe Akkerman	Netherlands	39	16	1	12	18	28	16	17	RET 51	29	137
35	Louise Cervera	France	7	26	9	35	17	21	13	40	43	10	138
36	Pernelle Michon	France	18	43	17	44	9	2	33	24	24	12	139
37	Ecem Güzel	Turkey	43	9	24	17	25	27	8	21	8	RET 51	139
38	Line Flem Høst	Norway	20	35	6	31	10	35	6	18	26	24	141
39	Martina Reino Cacho	Spain	16	15	5	25	24	26	35	RET 51	18	14	143
40	Haddon Hughes	United States	28	27	41	31	11	16	27	2	9	43	151
41	Cristina Pujol	Spain	17	6	4	6	39	33	36	29	31	26	152
42	Isabella Maegli	Guatemala	15	1	7	41	22	27	26	30	27	DSQ 51	155
43	Mara Stransky	Australia	21	28	2	1	38	25	20	BFD 51	46	22	157
44	Susannah Pyatt	New Zealand	37	19	30	29	16	19	12	4	39	30	159
45	Joyce Floridia	Italy	33	31	19	25	21	10	RET 51	9	11	39	159
46	Ashley Stoddart	Australia	46	44	14	14	20	19	4	24	22	48	161
47	Tatiana Drozdovskaya	Belarus	26	8	28	22	8	13	RET 51	15	45	47	165
48	Valentina Balbi	Italy	45	12	13	22	29	26	12	23	44	38	175
49	Pia Kuhlmann	Germany	25	26	42	29	7	8	24	32	36	44	187
50	Anna Munch	Denmark	6	34	40	38	32	20	22	1	UFD 51	45	198

Legend: BFD – Black flag disqualification; DNC – Did not come to the starting area; DNF – Did not finish; DSQ – Disqualified; RDG – Redress given; UFD – "U" flag disqualification;

==== Silver fleet ====
As of end of regatta

Results of individual races
Pos	Helmsman	Country	I	II	III	IV	V	VI	VII	VIII	IX	X	Pts
1	Lucía Falasca	Argentina	35	32	27	34	19	3	35	16	1	4	136
2	Hannah Van Goor	Netherlands	40	40	20	16	41	13	26	8	13	2	138
3	Milda Eidukeviciute	Lithuania	23	16	31	5	28	31	45	26	8	9	146
4	Ekaterina Zyuzina	Russia	41	17	16	8	17	RET 51	24	37	RET 51	3	163
5	Zoe Thomson	Australia	2	24	18	RET 51	33	43	31	35	22	1	166
6	Lena Haverland	Germany	22	43	21	17	26	20	27	31	18	18	169
7	Rheanna Pavey	Great Britain	19	11	44	1	46	41	38	36	10	15	171
8	Aoife Hopkins	Ireland	48	25	41	24	20	23	17	22	19	26	176
9	Elyse Ainsworth	Australia	27	38	28	40	34	18	25	29	7	14	182
10	Alice Woodings Hyde	Great Britain	32	46	24	3	DNF 51	46	18	40	4	19	186
11	Momoko Tada	Japan	24	21	33	28	41	31	40	41	3	6	186
12	Hanne Weaver	United States	17	33	34	37	36	37	BFD 51	20	5	11	193
13	Carolina Albano	Italy	25	38	33	44	30	23	7	7	30	RET 51	193
14	Martina Bezdekova	Czech Republic	11	34	15	27	46	42	2	42	29	36	196
15	Laura Bo Voss	Germany	12	20	40	11	43	39	36	35	14	30	197
16	Sandra Lulic	Croatia	6	DSQ 51	30	40	DSQ 51	29	28	30	25	13	201
17	Yumiko Tombe	Japan	40	31	22	43	43	30	21	34	2	22	202
18	Sophia Reineke	United States	34	8	26	33	35	38	19	RET 51	31	17	203
19	Aisling Keller	Ireland	45	18	29	30	27	34	37	36	21	8	203
20	Andela De Micheli Vitturi	Croatia	37	4	22	42	30	22	23	RET 51	26	DSQ 51	206
21	Paloma Schmidt Gutierrez	Peru	26	21	21	35	35	29	29	31	17	RET 51	209
22	Ellie Cumpsty	Great Britain	43	39	23	UFD 51	32	22	43	25	20	7	211
23	Lindsey Baab	United States	44	23	25	15	RET 51	DNE 51	13	20	41	25	213
24	Kelly-Ann Arrindell	Trinidad and Tobago	12	20	35	32	36	41	29	41	16	34	214
25	Anna Pohlak	Estonia	18	41	BFD 51	23	14	25	40	38	36	27	221
26	Caren Niezen	Netherlands	36	17	36	46	31	43	30	17	33	24	224
27	Andrea Nordquist	Switzerland	31	35	38	39	23	28	14	BFD 51	23	35	227
28	Kamolwan Chanyim	Thailand	9	32	39	37	42	37	31	39	6	43	230
29	Annabelle Rennie-Younger	New Zealand	41	44	27	36	45	44	9	37	28	10	232
30	Luciana Cardozo	Argentina	13	40	42	28	33	9	BFD 51	45	40	28	233
31	Maura Dewey	Canada	46	45	18	39	42	33	32	28	39	5	236
32	Christina Sakellaris	United States	42	48	43	38	37	38	20	14	35	12	236
33	Anna Skaar	Norway	38	29	49	27	40	36	39	46	9	21	239
34	Clementine Thompson	Great Britain	47	42	37	21	34	35	28	11	34	41	241
35	Aina Bauza Roig	Spain	30	29	32	41	29	46	41	33	24	29	247
36	Francesca Frazza	Italy	29	30	47	45	28	36	38	BFD 51	12	33	251
37	Erica Partanen	Finland	38	49	37	33	31	14	34	34	32	39	253
38	Gabriella Kidd	Brazil	35	12	46	26	DSQ 51	32	41	BFD 51	RET 51	20	263
39	Mariela Nikolova	Bulgaria	10	23	36	43	47	45	44	DNF 51	37	31	269
40	Marlena Berzins	Australia	49	28	38	20	26	32	RET 51	BFD 51	38	38	269
41	Stefani Muzakova	Bulgaria	8	41	45	DSQ 51	44	42	DNE 51	39	11	40	276
42	Olivia Christie	New Zealand	36	37	48	45	44	RET 51	44	BFD 51	15	23	292
43	Laura Kragh Frederiksen	Denmark	48	39	39	42	27	39	33	38	46	37	294
44	Agija Elerte	Latvia	44	48	48	11	38	45	42	43	43	32	298
45	Sofiia Larycheva	Ukraine	49	45	45	46	37	34	25	27	44	42	299
46	Karina Jangazova	Kazakhstan	39	47	46	47	45	40	43	44	27	16	300
47	Laura Oliva Vidal	Spain	47	46	RET 51	21	40	DNE 51	37	22	42	DNE 51	310
48	Emiri Koya	Japan	33	36	43	34	47	44	42	43	47	44	319
49	Estere Kumpina	Latvia	50	37	47	47	39	40	BFD 51	28	45	45	328

Legend: BFD – Black flag disqualification; DNC – Did not come to the starting area; DNF – Did not finish; DSQ – Disqualified; RDG – Redress given; UFD – "U" flag disqualification;
