= List of sail codes =

List of codes

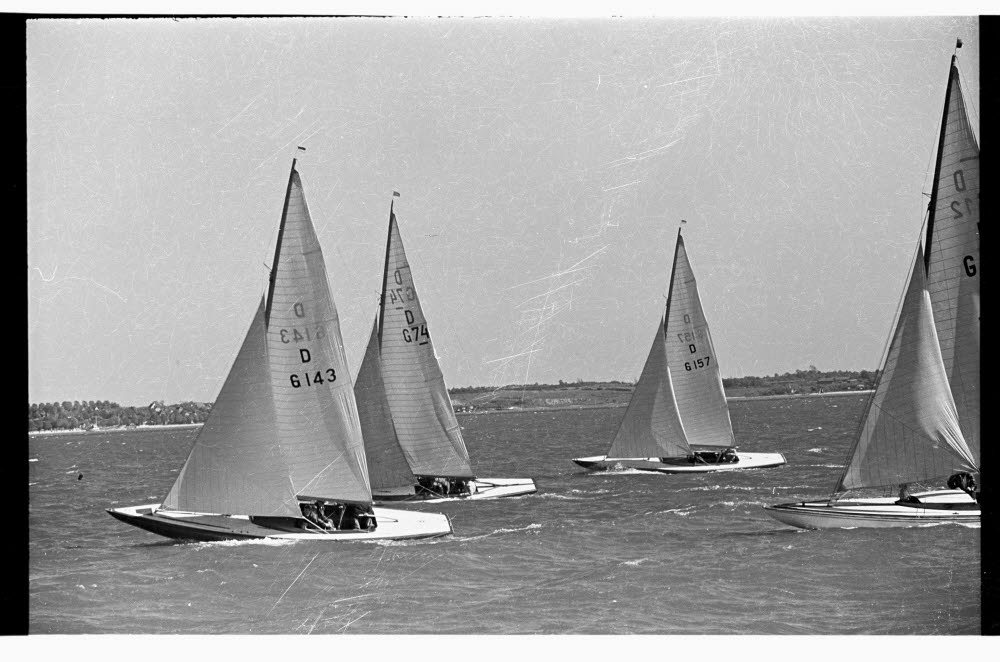
Sailboats of the Dragon class displaying national letters and sail numbers G 143, G 74, and G 157, indicating that they are from West Germany

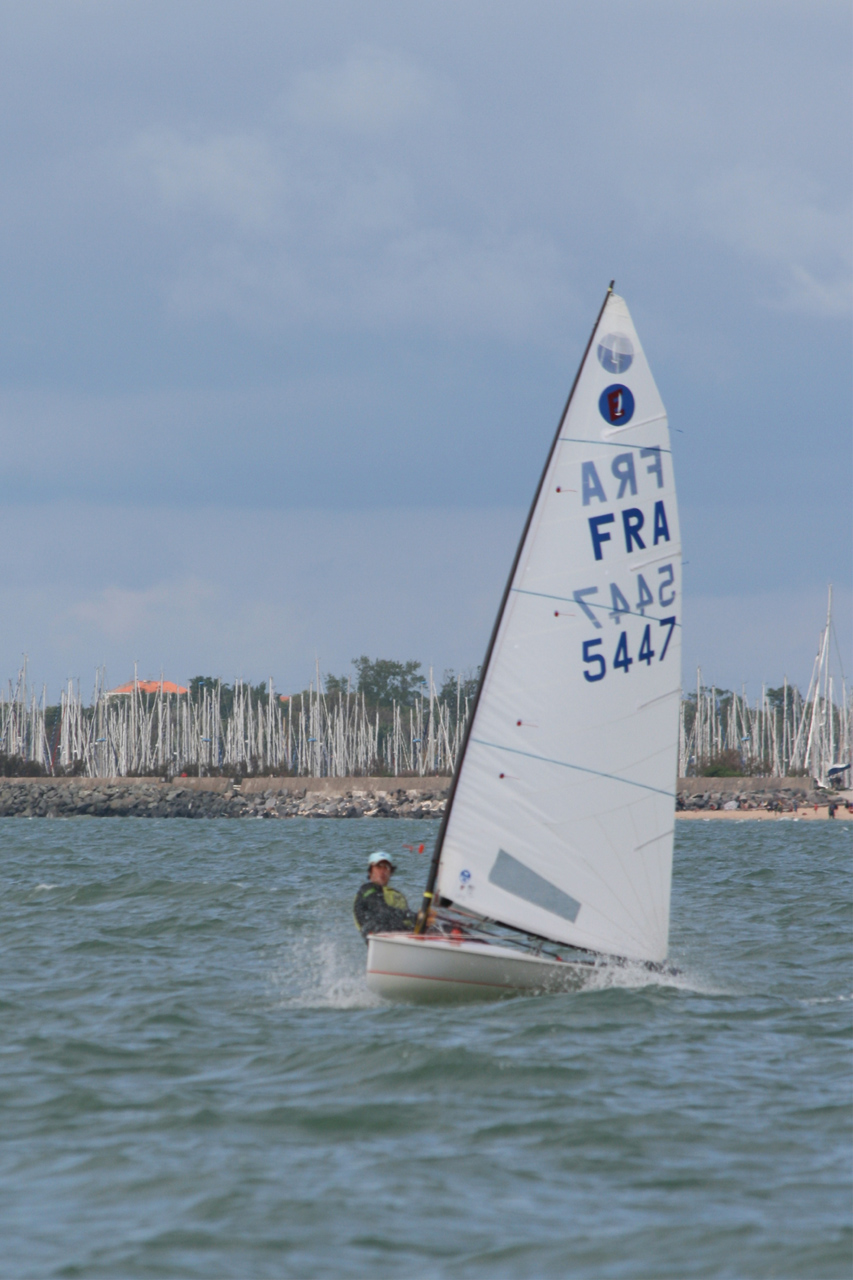
Dinghy of the Europe class displaying national letters and sail number FRA 5447, indicating that it is from France

This is a list of sail codes for sailing yachts and the old codes, used until 1992 by the International Sailing Federation.

Sail country codes must comply with World Sailing Racing Rules of Sailing. The Racing Rules of Sailing Appendix G1.2 specifies that national letters shall be clearly legible and of the same color.

They must be placed below the class insignias and above the sail number.

In 1992, the code system was aligned to the one of IOC and has followed since.

The complete list is published by World Sailing (formerly ISAF) and can be accessed on "Appendix G IDENTIFICATION ON SAILS" of the rules

== Current MNAs ==
Current codes as of The Racing Rules of Sailing:

Old system	Current system	Country	Other codes used
	AHO	Netherlands Antilles	
	ALG	Algeria	
	AND	Andorra	
	ANG	Angola	
	ANT	Antigua and Barbuda	
A	ARG	Argentina	
	ARM	Armenia	
	ARU	Aruba	
	ASA	American Samoa	
KA	AUS	Australia	
OE	AUT	Austria	
	AZE	Azerbaijan	
BA	BAH	Bahamas	
	BAR	Barbados	
B	BEL	Belgium	
KB	BER	Bermuda	
	BIZ	Belize	
	BLR	Belarus	
	BOL	Bolivia	
	BOT	Botswana	
BL	BRA	Brazil	
	BRN	Bahrain	
	BRU	Brunei	
BU	BUL	Bulgaria	
	CAM	Cambodia	
KC	CAN	Canada	
	CAY	Cayman Islands	
X	CHI	Chile	
	CHN	China	
	COK	Cook Islands	
CB	COL	Colombia	
	CRO	Croatia	
	CUB	Cuba	
CP	CYP	Cyprus	
CZ	CZE	Czech Republic	
D	DEN	Denmark	
	DJI	Djibouti	
	DOM	Dominican Republic	
EC	ECU	Ecuador	
	EGY	Egypt	
SL	ESA	El Salvador	
E	ESP	Spain	
	EST	Estonia	
	FIJ	Fiji	
L	FIN	Finland	
F	FRA	France	
K	GBR	Great Britain	
	GEO	Georgia	
	GER	Germany	
G	FRG		
?	GDR		
GR	GRE	Greece	
	GRN	Grenada	
	GUA	Guatemala	
	GUM	Guam	
KH	HKG	Hong Kong	
M	HUN	Hungary	
RI	INA	Indonesia	
	IND	India	
	IRI	Iran	
IR	IRL	Ireland	
	IRQ	Iraq	
IL	ISL	Iceland	
IS	ISR	Israel	
VI	ISV	U.S. Virgin Islands	
I	ITA	Italy	
KV	IVB	British Virgin Islands	
KJ	JAM	Jamaica	
	JOR	Jordan	
J	JPN	Japan	
	KAZ	Kazakhstan	
KK	KEN	Kenya	
	KGZ	Kyrgyzstan	
	KOR	South Korea	
	KOS	Kosovo	
	KSA	Saudi Arabia	
	KUW	Kuwait	
	LAT	Latvia	
	LBA	Libya	
	LCA	Saint Lucia	
	LIB	Lebanon	
FL	LIE	Liechtenstein	
	LTU	Lithuania	
LX	LUX	Luxembourg	
	MAC	Macau	
	MAD	Madagascar	
	MAR	Morocco	
	MAS	Malaysia	
	MDA	Moldova	
MX	MEX	Mexico	
	MKD	North Macedonia	
MT	MLT	Malta	
	MNE	Montenegro	
	MNT	Montserrat	
MO	MON	Monaco	
	MOZ	Mozambique	
	MRI	Mauritius	
	MYA	Myanmar	
NA	NAM	Namibia	
	NCA	Nicaragua	
H	NED	Netherlands	
	NGR	Nigeria	
N	NOR	Norway	
KZ	NZL	New Zealand	
	OMA	Oman	
	PAK	Pakistan	
	PAN	Panama	
	PAR	Paraguay	
PU	PER	Peru	
PH	PHI	Philippines	
	PLE	Palestine	
	PNG	Papua New Guinea	
PZ	POL	Poland	
P	POR	Portugal	
	PRK	North Korea	
PR	PUR	Puerto Rico	
	QAT	Qatar	
RM	ROU	Romania	ROM
SA	RSA	South Africa	KZA
	RUS	Russia	
	SAM	Samoa	
	SEN	Senegal	
	SEY	Seychelles	
	SGP	Singapore	SIN
	SKN	Saint Kitts and Nevis	
	SLO	Slovenia	
SM	SMR	San Marino	
	SOL	Solomon Islands	
	SRB	Serbia	
CY	SRI	Sri Lanka	
	SUD	Sudan	
Z	SUI	Switzerland	
	SVK	Slovakia	
S	SWE	Sweden	
	TAH	French Polynesia	
	TAN	Tanzania	
	TCA	Turks and Caicos Islands	
	TGA	Tonga	
TA	THA	Thailand	
	TJK	Tajikistan	
	TLS	Timor-Leste	
	TPE	Chinese Taipei	
	TTO	Trinidad and Tobago	
	TUN	Tunisia	
TK	TUR	Turkey	
	UAE	United Arab Emirates	
	UGA	Uganda	
	UKR	Ukraine	
	URU	Uruguay	
US	USA	United States	
	VAN	Vanuatu	
V	VEN	Venezuela	
	VIE	Vietnam	
	VIN	Saint Vincent and the Grenadines	
ZB	ZIM	Zimbabwe	

== Former MNAs ==
Old system	Current system	Country	Other codes used
DDR		East Germany	GO
KR		Rhodesia	
SR		Soviet Union	
Y	YUG	Yugoslavia	
