= Sailing at the 2016 Summer Olympics – Laser Radial =

Women's Laser Radial at the Games of the XXXI Olympiad
- Line drawing of the Laser Radial
- Venue: Marina da Glória
- Dates: 8–16 August 2016
- Competitors: 37 from 37 nations
- Winning total: 61 points

Medalists
1st place, gold medalist(s)		Marit Bouwmeester	Netherlands
2nd place, silver medalist(s)		Annalise Murphy	Ireland
3rd place, bronze medalist(s)		Anne-Marie Rindom	Denmark

The women's Laser Radial competition at the 2016 Summer Olympics in Rio de Janeiro took place between 8–16 August at Marina da Glória. Eleven races (the last one a medal race) were scheduled. Due to weather conditions the medal race was postponed a day.

== Schedule ==
Mon 8 Aug	Tue 9 Aug	Wed 10 Aug	Thu 11 Aug	Fri 12 Aug	Sat 13 Aug	Sun 14 Aug	Mon 15 Aug	Tue 16 Aug
Race 1 Race 2	Race 3 Race 4	Race 5 Race 6	Rest day	Race 7 Race 8	Race 9 Race 10	Rest day	Medal race (postponed)	Medal race (rescheduled)

== Results ==
Results of individual races
Pos	Helmsman	Country	I	II	III	IV	V	VI	VII	VIII	IX	X	MR	Tot	Pts
Gold medal	Marit Bouwmeester	Netherlands	6	4	15^{†}	4	1	6	6	13	5	2	14	75.0	61.0
Silver medal	Annalise Murphy	Ireland	1	13	4	7	5	2	17^{†}	12	6	7	10	84.0	67.0
Bronze medal	Anne-Marie Rindom	Denmark	5	8	DSQ 38^{†}	3	3	1	4	6	22	3	16	109.0	71.0
4	Evi Van Acker	Belgium	2	12	2	29^{†}	16	15	11	2	1	5	12	107.0	78.0
5	Tuula Tenkanen	Finland	4	16^{†}	RDG 8.6	2	14	3	13	8	2	14	18	102.6	86.6
6	Josefin Olsson	Sweden	17	5	8	17	7	4	3	14	20^{†}	10	DPI 6	110.0	90.0
7	Gintarė Scheidt	Lithuania	UFD 38^{†}	1	9	8	12	5	12	21	4	11	8	128.0	90.0
8	Alison Young	Great Britain	13	17	13	26^{†}	6	9	7	10	16	1	2	119.0	93.0
9	Ashley Stoddart	Australia	8	6	17	28^{†}	11	11	23	11	7	8	6	135.0	107.0
10	Paige Railey	United States	15	2	10	21	2	7	25^{†}	24	25	4	DPI 22	156.0	131.0
11	Lucía Falasca	Argentina	7	11	20	15	20	22	1	15	3	25^{†}		138.0	113.0
12	Veronika Fenclová	Czech Republic	11	7	11	16	9	16	8	22^{†}	17	19		135.0	113.0
13	Tina Mihelić	Croatia	DSQ 38^{†}	3	12	10	4	14	DNF 38	5	23	16		162.0	124.0
14	Mária Érdi	Hungary	20	22	1	5	26^{†}	20	10	18	9	20		151.0	125.0
15	Nazlı Çağla Dönertaş	Turkey	16	20	7	9	22	10	5	27	12	28^{†}		155.0	127.0
16	Brenda Bowskill	Canada	9	30^{†}	16	20	10	19	9	20	10	15		157.0	127.0
17	Alicia Cebrián	Spain	27^{†}	9	25	12	13	8	27	4	21	12		157.0	130.0
18	Xu Lijia	China	3	DSQ 38^{†}	3	1	8	12	DSQ 38	DSQ 38	19	13		173.0	135.0
19	Tatiana Drozdovskaya	Belarus	22	10	6	13	25	17	26	30^{†}	13	6		167.0	137.0
20	Manami Doi	Japan	21	14	19	24^{†}	24	23	2	1	15	21		163.0	139.0
21	Mathilde de Kerangat	France	23	15	26^{†}	14	17	18	14	9	14	22		171.0	146.0
22	Silvia Zennaro	Italy	10	24	24	18	15	21	15	16	28^{†}	17		187.0	159.0
23	Tiril Bue	Norway	18	18	14	6	19	24	22	25	18	27^{†}		190.0	163.0
24	Fernanda Decnop	Brazil	14	19	21	19	28^{†}	26	16	23	8	18		191.0	163.0
25	Dolores Moreira	Uruguay	12	32^{†}	23	22	31	28	28	7	11	24		217.0	185.0
26	Elizabeth Yin	Singapore	19	29	27	11	23	25	20	17	UFD 38^{†}	23		231.0	193.0
27	Sara Carmo	Portugal	34^{†}	31	22	25	18	13	29	29	26	9		235.0	201.0
28	Philipine van Aanholt	Aruba	24	21	18	32^{†}	27	27	21	19	24	26		238.0	206.0
29	Stephanie Devaux-Lovell	Saint Lucia	29	25	30	33^{†}	30	29	24	3	27	30		259.0	226.0
30	Ines Gmati	Tunisia	28	23	32	23	21	31	19	28	31	34^{†}		269.0	235.0
31	Paloma Schmidt	Peru	31	26	29	27	29	30	18	32^{†}	30	29		280.0	248.0
32	Kamolwan Chanyim	Thailand	25	27	28	31	32	34	30	31	UFD 38^{†}	31		306.0	268.0
33	Nur Shazrin Mohd Latif	Malaysia	26	33	34	30	33	35^{†}	31	26	29	33		309.0	274.0
34	Cecilia Wollmann	Bermuda	32	28	33	35^{†}	35	33	34	33	32	32		326.0	291.0
35	Teau McKenzie	Cook Islands	30	36	35	37^{†}	34	32	33	35	34	35		340.0	303.0
36	Florence Allan	Cayman Islands	35	34	31	36	DNF 38^{†}	DNF 38	32	34	33	36		346.0	308.0
37	Imène Cherif-Sahraoui	Algeria	33	35	36	34	DNF 38^{†}	DNF 38	35	DNS 38	DNS 38	DNC 38		362.0	324.0

Scoring system: low-point system;
Legend: – Qualified for medal race(s); DNC – Did not come to the starting area; DNF – Did not finish; DNS – Did not start; DPI – Discretionary penalty imposed; DSQ – Disqualified; RDG – Redress given; UFD – "U" flag disqualification; † – Discarded race not counted in the overall result;
