= Sailing at the 2012 Summer Olympics – Laser Radial =

Women's Laser Radial at the Games of the XXX Olympiad
- Line drawing of the Laser Radial
- Venue: Weymouth and Portland National Sailing Academy
- Dates: 30 July – 6 August
- Competitors: 41 from 41 nations

Medalists
1st place, gold medalist(s)		Xu Lijia	China
2nd place, silver medalist(s)		Marit Bouwmeester	Netherlands
3rd place, bronze medalist(s)		Evi Van Acker	Belgium

The women's Laser Radial was a sailing event on the Sailing at the 2012 Summer Olympics program in Weymouth and Portland National Sailing Academy. Eleven races (last one a medal race) were scheduled and completed. 41 sailors, on 41 boats, from 41 nations competed. Ten boats qualified for the medal race on course area Nothe in front of Weymouth, where each position scored double points.

== Schedule ==
●	Practice race	●	Race on Portland	●	Race on Nothe	●	Race on West	●	Race on South	●	Medal race on Nothe

Date	July							August											
Date	26 Thu	27 Fri	28 Sat	29 Sun	30 Mon	31 Tue		1 Wed	2 Thu	3 Fri	4 Sat	5 Sun	6 Mon	7 Tue	8 Wed	9 Thu	10 Fri	11 Sat	12 Sun
Women's Laser Radial				●	● ●	●	●	● ●	Spare day	● ●	● ●	Spare day	●						

== Course areas and course configurations ==
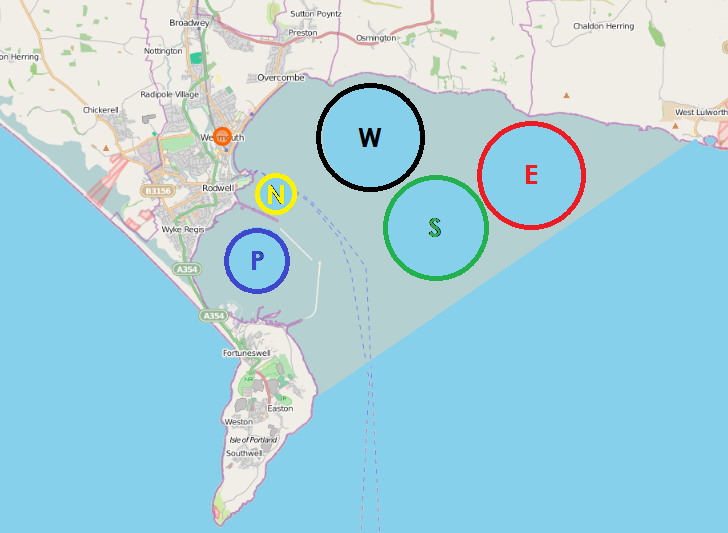
Course areas: Portland (P) Nothe (N) West (W) / South (S) East (E)

For the Laser Radial course areas Portland, Nothe, West, and South were used. The location (50° 35.19’ N, 02° 26.54’ W) points to the center Portland course area, the location (50° 36.18’ N 02° 25.98’ W) points to the center of the Nothe course area, the location (50° 37.18’ N 02° 23.55’ W) points to the center of the West course area and the location (50° 35.71’ N 02° 22.08’ W) points to the center of the South course area. The target time for the course was 60 minutes for the races and 30 minutes for the medal race. The race management could choose from many course configurations.

== Results ==
Results of individual races
Pos	Helmsman	Country	I	II	III	IV	V	VI	VII	VIII	IX	X	MR	Tot	Pts
Gold medal	Xu Lijia	China	5	8	11^{†}	3	5	4	1	4	1	2	2	46.0	35.0
Silver medal	Marit Bouwmeester	Netherlands	6^{†}	3	4	5	6	1	4	3	6	1	4	43.0	37.0
Bronze medal	Evi Van Acker	Belgium	3	2	3	8^{†}	1	5	8	1	8	3	6	48.0	40.0
4	Annalise Murphy	Ireland	1	1	1	1	8	19^{†}	2	10	3	7	10	63.0	44.0
5	Alison Young	Great Britain	7	10	2	2	2	11	6	8	BFD 42^{†}	4	8	102.0	60.0
6	Gintarė Scheidt	Lithuania	2	13	9	10	3	14^{†}	11	7	7	6	14	96.0	82.0
7	Sari Multala	Finland	4	6	15	4	19	27^{†}	3	2	16	5	20	115.0	94.0
8	Paige Railey	United States	8	5	12	17	4	9	27^{†}	20	9	8	12	125.0	104.0
9	Veronika Fenclová	Czech Republic	23^{†}	4	7	6	21	2	17	6	12	12	18	128.0	105.0
10	Tania Elías Calles	Mexico	12	9	6	19^{†}	13	33	13	5	13	10	16	149.0	116.0
11	Alicia Cebrián	Spain	15	11	14	9	24^{†}	23	5	9	2	13		125.0	101.0
12	Krystal Weir	Australia	18	18	10	23	7	35^{†}	7	12	4	22		156.0	121.0
13	Anne-Marie Rindom	Denmark	17	19	8	22	12	7	27^{†}	23	11	11		157.0	130.0
14	Nathalie Brugger	Switzerland	13	25	18	14	15	10	BFD 42^{†}	14	10	16		177.0	135.0
15	Tatiana Drozdovskaya	Belarus	10	7	23	16	16	13	19	16	BFD 42^{†}	18		180.0	138.0
16	Sarah Steyaert	France	21	14	19	12	11	26^{†}	10	19	22	15		169.0	143.0
17	Tina Mihelić	Croatia	14	12	22	25^{†}	17	25	14	13	14	17		173.0	148.0
18	Josefin Olsson	Sweden	25	17	5	18	14	24	29^{†}	29	5	14		180.0	151.0
19	Francesca Clapcich	Italy	20	16	24	7	9	27^{†}	18	25	21	19		186.0	159.0
20	Sara Winther	New Zealand	31	23	21	15	35	31	9	11	BFD 42^{†}	9		227.0	185.0
21	Cecilia Carranza	Argentina	9	28	13	28	10	30	12	35^{†}	20	35		220.0	185.0
22	Anna Weinzieher	Poland	16	26^{†}	25	21	20	16	22	24	15	27		212.0	185.0
23	Marthe Enger Eide	Norway	30	24	32^{†}	11	23	15	23	21	17	30		226.0	194.0
24	Elizabeth Yin	Singapore	34^{†}	27	29	13	28	12	26	18	19	25		231.0	197.0
25	Adriana Kostiw	Brazil	11	15	27	31	25	17	BFD 42^{†}	26	30	34		258.0	216.0
26	Franziska Goltz	Germany	26	20	26	24	18	DNF 42^{†}	28	15	DNE 42	21		262.0	220.0
27	Danielle Dube	Canada	22	21	20	33^{†}	31	32	25	17	24	28		253.0	220.0
28	Sara Carmo	Portugal	32	22	17	20	27	20	32	38^{†}	28	24		260.0	222.0
29	Nazlı Çağla Dönertaş	Turkey	19	35	16	30	22	38	20	32	BFD 42^{†}	20		274.0	232.0
30	Nufar Edelman	Israel	33	33	33	34^{†}	29	3	34	28	18	26		271.0	237.0
31	Manami Doi	Japan	29	32	31	27	26	36^{†}	30	22	27	29		289.0	253.0
32	Andrea Aldana	Guatemala	24	36	34	39^{†}	38	8	24	33	29	31		296.0	257.0
33	Anna Agrafioti	Greece	28	29	30	32	34^{†}	34	15	34	23	32		291.0	257.0
34	Svetlana Shnitko	Russia	37	31	35	35	37	18	31	30	25	38^{†}		317.0	279.0
35	Anna Pohlak	Estonia	27	39	41^{†}	37	36	6	36	36	31	36		325.0	284.0
36	Philipine van Aanholt	Independent Olympic Athletes	36	38	38	29	33	37	16	27	BFD 42^{†}	37		333.0	291.0
37	Beth Lygoe	Saint Lucia	38	37	28	38	39^{†}	29	37	37	26	23		332.0	293.0
38	Andrea Foglia	Uruguay	39	34	37	26	32	40^{†}	38	31	33	33		343.0	303.0
39	Paloma Schmidt	Peru	35	30	36	36	30	39	33	41^{†}	32	39		351.0	310.0
40	Mayumi Roller	Virgin Islands	40	41^{†}	40	41	41	22	35	40	35	41		376.0	335.0
41	Helema Williams	Cook Islands	41^{†}	40	39	40	40	28	39	39	34	40		380.0	339.0

Scoring system: low-point system; Source:
Legend: – Qualified for medal race(s); BFD – Black flag disqualification; DNE – Non excludable disqualification; DNF – Did not finish; † – Discarded race not counted in the overall result;

== Daily standings ==
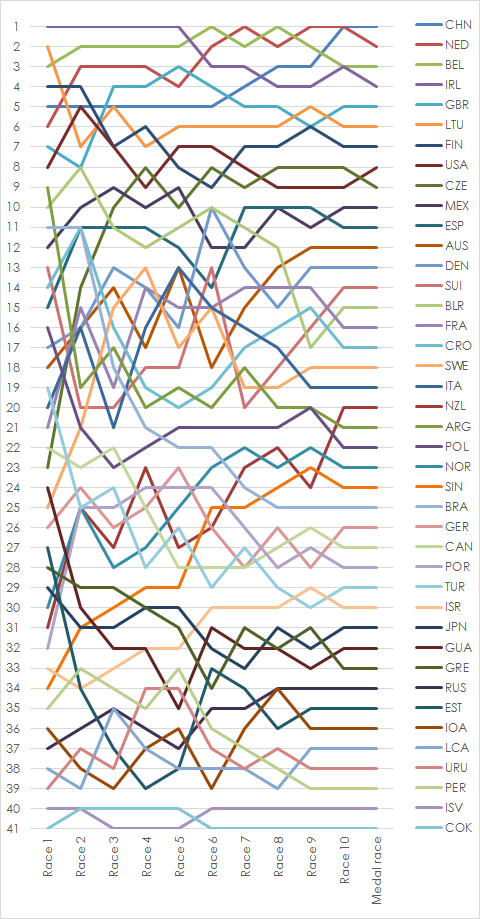
Graph showing the daily standings in the Women's Laser Radial during the 2012 Summer Olympics
