= 2017 6 Metre World Cup =

Sailing event

Event title
- Edition: 22nd
- Host: Royal Vancouver Yacht Club

Event details
- Venue: Vancouver, Canada
- Dates: 17–21 September

Competitors
- Competitors: 54 teams
- Competing nations: 11

Results
- (gold) Gold: (Switzerland) Phillippe Durr
- (silver) Silver: (Canada) Ben Mumford
- (bronze) Bronze: (United Kingdom) Andy Beadsworth

The 2017 6 Metre World Cup was held in Vancouver, Canada 17–21 September 2017 hosted by Royal Vancouver Yacht Club. Phillippe Durr won the World Championship title.

== Results ==
=== Open division ===
Results of individual races
Pos	Boat name	Crew	Country	I	II	III	IV	V	VI	VII	VIII	Tot	Pts
Gold medal	Junior	Phillippe Durr	Switzerland	2	1	2	2	6	5	1	11^{†}	30.0	19.0
Silver medal	New Sweden	Ben Mumford	Canada	1	3	1	6	14^{†}	6	5	2	38.0	24.0
Bronze medal	St Francis IX	Andy Beadsworth	Great Britain	3	2	4	1	2	4	9	UFD 25^{†}	50.0	25.0
4	Sophie II	Hugo Stenbeck	Switzerland	DSQ 25^{†}	10	3	3	1	2	4	3	51.0	26.0
5	Sting	Russ Silvestri	United States	4	7^{†}	5	5	3	1	6	7	38.0	31.0
6	Evelina	Henrik Andersin	Finland	6	4	8	4	5	9^{†}	8	1	45.0	36.0
7	Scallywag	Craig Healy	United States	7	15	20^{†}	11	4	8	2	8	75.0	55.0
8	Wildcat II	Fraser McMillan	Canada	12	5	9	8	8	7	12	13^{†}	74.0	61.0
9	Courage IX	Reinhard Suhner	Switzerland	11	11	7	18^{†}	11	16	3	4	81.0	63.0
10	Notorious	Claes Henningsson	Sweden	8	9	10	15^{†}	9	11	11	10	83.0	68.0
11	Max'inux	Peter Wealick	Canada	15	16^{†}	12	7	7	10	7	12	86.0	70.0
12	Capriccio	Gary Philbrick	United States	5	17	11	14	12	13	RET 25^{†}	6	103.0	78.0
13	Bear	Andy Parker	United States	10	12	17	16	10	RET 25^{†}	10	5	105.0	80.0
14	Scoundrel	Eliza Richartz	United States	DSQ 25^{†}	8	6	13	21	3	21	9	106.0	81.0
15	Arunga	Robert Cadranell	Switzerland	9	14	14	12	13	15	14	UFD 25^{†}	116.0	91.0
16	Blade	Steven Kinsey	Canada	14	13	13	19^{†}	15	12	13	14	113.0	94.0
17	Lyonesse	Robert Leigh-Wood	Great Britain	16	6	19	17	16	14	18	UFD 25^{†}	131.0	106.0
18	Nuvolari	Ron Holland	New Zealand	13	19	15	9	19	17	15	UFD 25^{†}	132.0	107.0
19	Pacemaker	Adam Travis Henley	United States	20^{†}	18	18	20	17	19	17	15	144.0	124.0
20	St Francis V	David A. Linger	United States	17	20	16	22^{†}	18	20	22	16	151.0	129.0
21	St Francis VII	Hart Buck	Canada	19	21	21	21	20	18	16	UFD 25^{†}	161.0	136.0
22	Frenzy	Jon E. Bjornerud	United States	18	23	23	10	22	DNC 25^{†}	19	UFD 25	165.0	140.0
23	Ranger	Dana E. Olsen	United States	22	UFD 25^{†}	24	23	23	DNC 25	23	17	182.0	157.0
24	Finnegan	Thedy Schmid	Switzerland	21	22	22	DSQ 25^{†}	24	RET 25	20	RET 25	184.0	159.0

Source: www.rvan.ca/6mR/world.htm
Legend: DNC – Did not come to the starting area; DSQ – Disqualified; RET – Retired; UFD – "U" flag disqualification; † – Discarded race not counted in the overall result;

=== Classic division ===
Results of individual races
Pos	Boat name	Crew	Country	I	II	III	IV	V	VI	VII	VIII	Tot	Pts
1	Bribón Gallant	Juan Carlos I of Spain	Spain	2	3	3	3	1	2	9^{†}	8	31.0	22.0
2	Goose	Peter P. Hofmann	United States	3	1	5	6	5	9^{†}	4	1	34.0	25.0
3	Saskia	Lars Grael	Brazil	9^{†}	4	4	5	2	4	1	7	36.0	27.0
4	Fridolin	Henrik Lundberg	Finland	SCP 11	10	17^{†}	1	3	3	2	2	49.0	32.0
5	Flapper	Lars Guck	Hong Kong	11^{†}	2	2	4	6	5	10	6	46.0	35.0
6	Saga	Erik Bentzen	United States	1	8	13^{†}	7	4	1	8	9	51.0	38.0
7	Lucie	James A. Hilton	United States	6	7	9	8	8	10^{†}	6	3	57.0	47.0
8	Mena	Violeta Alvarez	Spain	14^{†}	5	11	11	9	6	3	4	63.0	49.0
9	Llanoria	Leigh Andrew	Canada	10	13	6	9	18^{†}	8	7	11	82.0	64.0
10	Sprig	Greg Stewart	United States	13	14	15^{†}	2	13	13	5	5	80.0	65.0
11	Hanko III	Thomas Kuhmann	Germany	SCP 9	9	8	13	10	12	12	14^{†}	87.0	73.0
12	Elisabeth X	Ossi Paija	Finland	8	12	OCS 22^{†}	14	7	7	UFD 22	16	108.0	86.0
13	Totem	Jesse Smith	United States	17^{†}	11	7	12	15	15	13	13	103.0	86.0
14	May Be VII	Dennis Conner	United States	4	6	1	10	DNC 22^{†}	DNC 22	DNC 22	DNC 22	109.0	87.0
15	Starwagon	Nigel Ashman	Canada	12	17^{†}	16	15	11	11	16	15	113.0	96.0
16	Kitsita II	Paul Faget	Canada	16	15	10	17^{†}	12	14	15	17	116.0	99.0
17	Lulu	Ismo Hentula	Finland	15	18	18	16	14	RET 22^{†}	11	10	124.0	102.0
18	Saleema	Steve White	Canada	19^{†}	16	19	19	16	18	14	12	133.0	114.0
19	Challenge	Michael Durland	United States	18	19	14	20^{†}	17	17	19	18	142.0	122.0
20	Ca Va	Sir Robert Owen & Dirk Stolp	Great Britain	RET 22^{†}	DNC 22	12	18	19	16	18	RET 22	149.0	127.0
21	Fokus III	Don Crossley	Canada	RET 22^{†}	DNC 22	20	21	20	DNC 22	17	19	163.0	141.0

Source: www.rvan.ca/6mR/world.htm
Legend: DSQ – Disqualified; OCS – On the course side of the starting line; RET – Retired; SCP – Scoring penalty taken; UFD – "U" flag disqualification; † – Discarded race not counted in the overall result;
