= Bowskill =

Bowskill is a surname. Notable people with the surname include:

- Brenda Bowskill (born 1992), Canadian sailor
- Jimmy Bowskill (born 1990), Canadian musician
