= Round Hainan Regatta =

- First held: 2010
- Organizer: Chinese Yachting Association
- Venue: Hainan Province, China

The Round Hainan Regatta is an annual sailing regatta in Hainan, China, founded in 2010 by the Chinese Yachting Association (CYA).
