= Josefin Olsson =

Swedish sports sailor (born 1989)

Personal information
- Full name: Josefin Anna Louise Olsson
- Born: 23 August 1989 (age 37) Nyköping, Sweden
- Height: 172 cm (5 ft 8 in)
- Weight: 67 kg (148 lb)

Sailing career
- Sport: Sailing
- Club: Royal Swedish Yacht Club
- Classes: ILCA 6; Europe
Medal record
Sailing
Representing Sweden
Olympic Games
| Silver medal – second place | 2020 Tokyo | Laser Radial |
World Championships
| Gold medal – first place | 2008 Vila Real de Santo António | Europe |
| Silver medal – second place | 2014 Santander | Laser Radial |

Josefin Anna Louise Olsson (born 23 August 1989) is a Swedish sailor primarily focusing on single-handed dinghies, who won a silver medal in the Laser Radial event at the 2020 Summer Olympics and also holds a silver medal from the Laser Radial World Championship and a World champion title from the Europe class.

== Career ==
Josefin Anna Louise Olsson was born 23 August 1989 in Saint Nicholas parish in Nyköping, Sweden. She started sailing in Oxelösunds Segelsällskap in nearby Oxelösund. She won the 2008 Europe World Championships in Vila Real de Santo António, Portugal, ahead of Danish Anne-Marie Rindom and Anette Viborg Andreasen. In 2008, she was awarded the Halvan trophy for best position by a youth Swedish sailor by the Swedish Sailing Federation.

At the 2012 Summer Olympics, she competed in the Women's Laser Radial class, finishing in 18th place. Olsson continued sailing the Laser Radial for the next Olympic cycle, and in September 2014, she won a silver medal at the 2014 ISAF Sailing World Championships in Santander, Spain, behind Marit Bouwmeester of the Netherlands.

She competed in the same event at the 2016 Olympics, finishing in sixth place. She competed at the 2020 Summer Olympics in Tokyo 2021, competing in Laser Radial. This time, she won a silver medal after having won the medal race.

In 2024, Olsson was again qualified for the Olympic sailing event and carried the Swedish flag during the opening ceremony. In the Laser Radial event, she finished 17th.

== Achievements ==
As of 23 July 2021

=== Olympics ===
| Year | Competition | Venue | Position | Event |
|---|---|---|---|---|
| 2012 | 2012 Olympic Games | Weymouth and Portland, United Kingdom | 18th | Laser Radial class |
| 2016 | 2016 Olympic Games | Rio de Janeiro, Brazil | 6th | Laser Radial class |
| 2020 | 2020 Olympic Games | Tokyo, Japan | 2nd | Laser Radial class |
| 2024 | 2024 Olympic Games | Marseille, France | 17th | Laser Radial class |

=== World Championships ===
| Year | Competition | Venue | Position | Event |
|---|---|---|---|---|
| 2006 | Europe World Championships | Copenhagen, Denmark | 13th | Europe class |
| 2008 | Europe World Championships | Vila Real de Santo António, Portugal | 1st | Europe class |
| 2009 | Laser Radial World Championships | Karatsu, Japan | 36th | Laser Radial class |
| 2010 | Laser Radial World Championships | Largs, UK | 20th | Laser Radial class |
| 2011 | ISAF Sailing World Championships | Perth, AUS | 13th | Laser Radial class |
| 2012 | Laser Radial World Championships | Boltenhagen, Germany | 18th | Laser Radial class |
| 2013 | Laser Radial World Championships | Rizhao, China | 6th | Laser Radial class |
| 2014 | ISAF Sailing World Championships | Santander, Spain | 2nd | Laser Radial class |
| 2015 | Laser Radial World Championships | Al-Musannah, Oman | 5th | Laser Radial class |
| 2017 | Laser Radial World Championships | Medemblik, the Netherlands | 28th | Laser Radial class |
| 2018 | Sailing World Championships | Aarhus, Denmark | 18th | Laser Radial class |
| 2019 | Laser Radial World Championships | Sakaiminato, Japan | 6th | Laser Radial class |
| 2020 | Laser Radial World Championships | Melbourne, Australia | 6th | Laser Radial class |
| 2022 | Laser Radial World Championships | | 4th | Laser Radial class |
| 2024 | Laser Radial World Championships | | 9th | Laser Radial class |
| 2024 | J/70 World Championship | | 75th | J/70 Open |

=== Others ===
| Year | Competition | Venue | Position | Event |
|---|---|---|---|---|
| 2009 | Laser European Championships | Charlottenlund, Denmark | 9th | Laser Radial class |
| 2010 | Laser European Championships | Tallinn, Estonia | 15th | Laser Radial class |
| 2011 | Laser European Championships | Helsinki, Finland | 15th | Laser Radial class |
| 2013 | Laser European Championships | Dún Laoghaire, Ireland | 12th | Laser Radial class |
| 2014 | Laser European Championships | Split, Croatia | 4th | Laser Radial class |
| 2016 | Laser European Championships | Gran Canaria, Spain | 2nd | Laser Radial class |
| 2019 | Laser European Championships | Porto, Portugal | 5th | Laser Radial class |
| 2020 | Laser European Championships | Gdańsk, Poland | 13th | Laser Radial class |
