= Evi Van Acker =

Belgian sailor

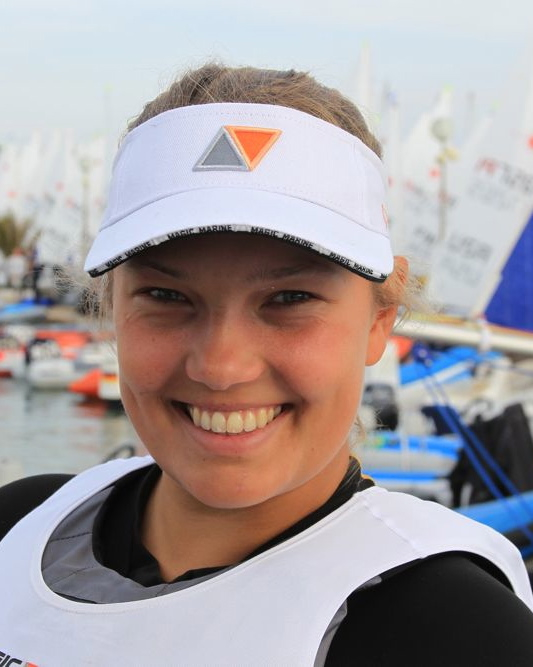

Personal information
- Nationality: Belgian
- Born: 23 September 1985 (age 40) Ghent, Belgium

Sailing career
- Sport: Sailing
Medal record
Representing Belgium
Olympic Games
Bronze medal – third place	2012 London	Laser Radial
World Championships
Silver medal – second place	2011 Perth	Laser Radial
Silver medal – second place	2017 Medemblik	Laser Radial
Bronze medal – third place	2014 Santander	Laser Radial
Bronze medal – third place	2015 Al Mussanah	Laser Radial

Evi Van Acker (born 23 September 1985) is a Belgian professional sailor. She has a Bachelor in Chemistry and is currently studying for a Master in bio-engineering.

== Career ==
Van Acker started sailing at age 7 in an Optimist dinghy and soon started on the youth program of the Royal Belgian Sailing Club. In 1998 she became European champion in the Optimist class. In 2000, she transferred to the Europe class and placed 17th in the 2003 World Championship. Having transferred to the Laser Radial, she became European champion in 2006, 2007 and 2011 and became second in the 2011 World Championship.

She went on to compete in the 2008 Olympic Sailing Competition finishing 8th in the Women's Singlehanded Class the Laser Radial.

On 6 August 2012 she won the bronze medal in the 2012 Olympic Sailing Competition in the Laser Radial class, behind Xu Lijia of China and Marit Bouwmeester of the Netherlands.

She was shortlisted in 2007 by the International Sailing Federation for the ISAF World Sailor of the Year Awards.
