= Sofiia Larycheva =

Ukrainian sailor

Sofiia Larycheva (Ukrainian: Софія Ларичева; born 1 September 1994, Kherson, Ukraine) is a Ukrainian Olympic Sailor, participant of Summer Youth Olympics in Byte CII category, currently sailing women one-person dinghy Olympic class Laser Radial. Winner of Europe Cup 2015.
