= Danielle Dube (sailor) =

Canadian sports sailor

Danielle Dube (born 20 February 1987 in Halifax, Nova Scotia) is a Canadian sports sailor. At the 2012 Summer Olympics, she competed in the Women's Laser Radial class, finishing in 27th place.
