= Nathalie Brugger =

Swiss sailor (born 1985)

Nathalie Brugger OLY (born 25 December 1985 in Lausanne) is a Swiss sailor. She competed in the Laser Radial class event at the 2008 Summer Olympics, finishing in 6th, and the 2012 Summer Olympics, where she placed 14th.
