= Anna Weinzieher =

Polish sailor

Anna Weinzieher (born 14 September 1990 in Warsaw) is a Polish sports sailor. At the 2012 Summer Olympics, she competed in the Women's Laser Radial class, finishing in 22nd place.
