= Franziska Goltz =

German sports sailor (born 1985)

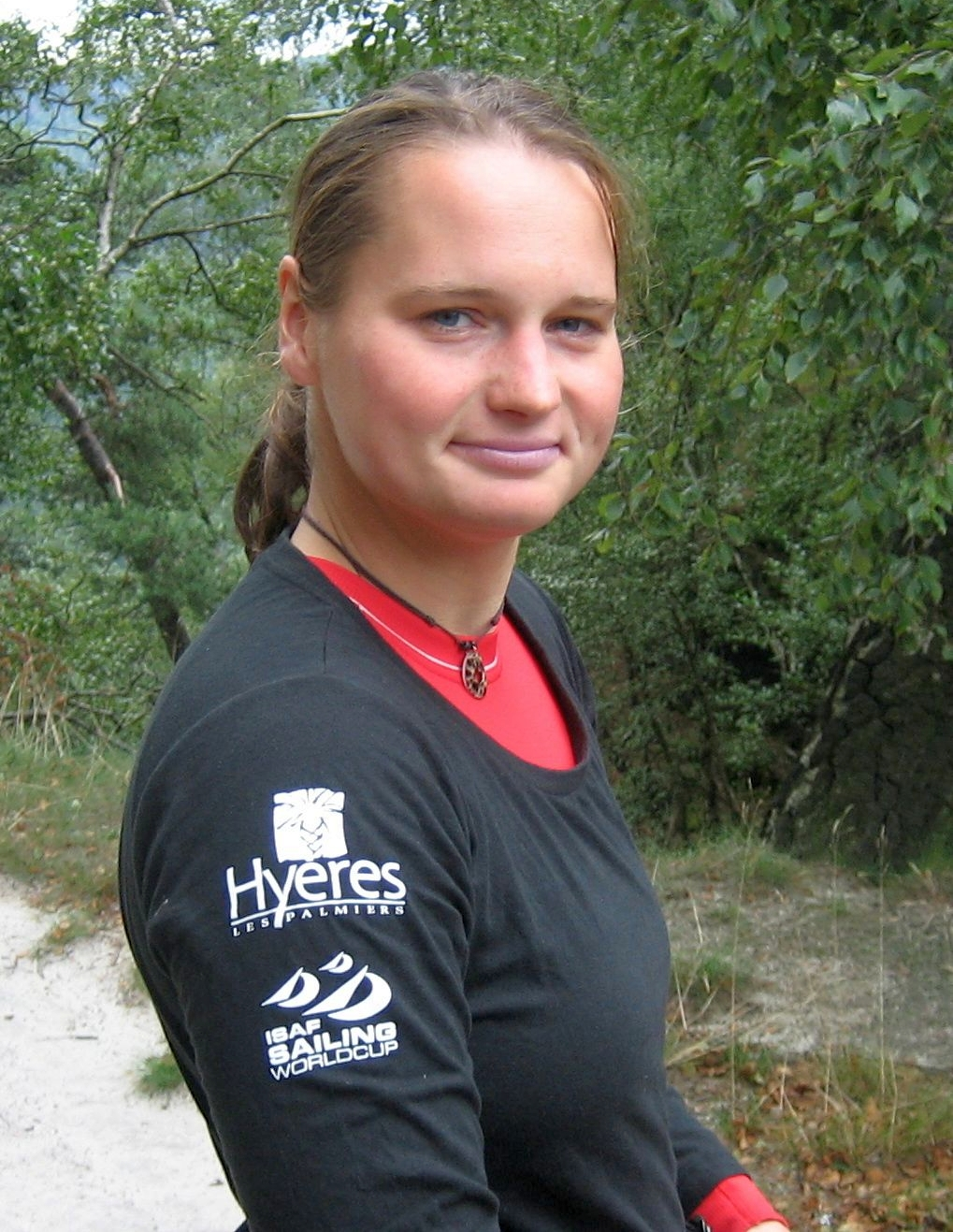
Franziska Goltz

Franziska Goltz (born 19 February 1985 in Schwerin) is a German sports sailor. At the 2012 Summer Olympics, she competed in the Women's Laser Radial class, finishing in 26th place.
