= Beth Lygoe =

Saint Lucian sailor

Beth Lygoe (born 17 September 1981) is a British born Saint Lucian sailor. She competed in Women's Laser Radial at the 2011 ISAF Sailing World Championships. She competed in Women's Laser Radial at the 2012 Summer Olympics finishing with a rank of 37th.
