= Nufar Edelman =

Israeli sailor

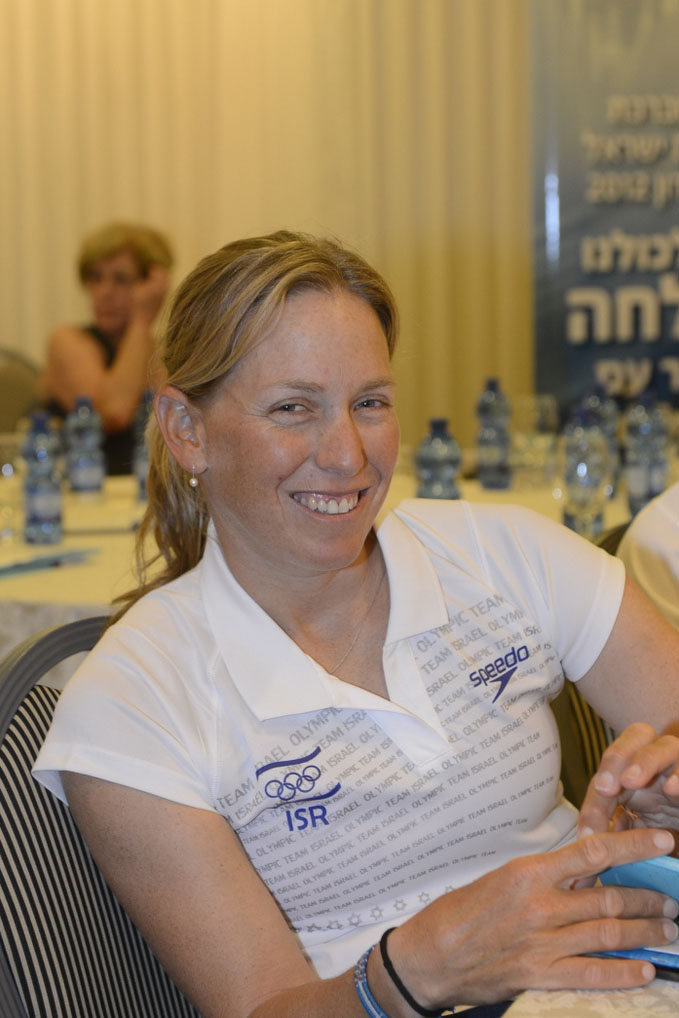
- Nufar Edekman in 2012

Personal information
- Birth name: נופר אדלמן
- Born: August 19, 1982 (age 42); Rosh HaNikra, Israel
- Height: 5 ft 6 in (168 cm)
- Weight: 150 lb (68 kg)

Sport
- Country: Israel
- Sport: Sailing
- Event: Women's Laser Radial One-Person Dinghy

Nufar Edelman (Hebrew: נופר אדלמן; born August 19, 1982) is an Israeli Olympic sailor. She competes in the Laser Radial, a class of small singlehanded sailing dinghy.

== Biography ==
Edelman is Jewish and was born in Rosh HaNikra, Israel. She finished 4th in the 2004 Laser Radial World Championships.

Edelman finished 7th out of 97 competitors in the 2007 Laser Radial World Championships in Cascais, Portugal, becoming the first Israeli woman to meet the criteria for the Olympics in the Laser Radial.

She competed on behalf of Israel at the 2008 Summer Olympics in Beijing, China, in the Women's Laser Radial One-Person Dinghy, and came in 16th. At the 2012 Summer Olympics she competed in the same class finishing in 30th place.
