= Svetlana Shnitko =

Russian sports sailor

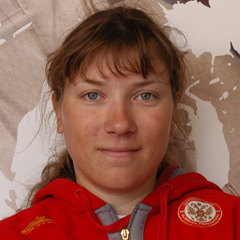
Svetlana Shnitko

Svetlana Shnitko (25 March 1987, Omsk, Russia) is a Russian sports sailor. At the 2012 Summer Olympics, she competed in the Women's Laser Radial class, finishing in 34th place.
