= Anna Agrafioti =

Greek sports sailor

Anna Agrafioti (Greek: Αννα Αγραφιωτη; born 10 April 1991 in Athens) is a Greek sports sailor.

Anna started sailing when she was 5 years old. She was a Greek champion in Women's Laser Radial class for several years. She has participated in 4 World Championships and 5 European Championships. She was part of the Greek sailing team from 2006 until 2012. In 2012, Anna was part of the Greek Olympic Team.

At the 2012 Summer Olympics, she competed in the Women's Laser Radial class, finishing in 33rd place.

After 2012, Anna finished her studies in Physical Education and Sport Science and left to Qatar to work as a national coach. She now works as a yoga teacher.
