= Austrian Sailing Federation =

Austrian national governing body for sport of sailing

Austrian Sailing Federation ASF
- IOC nation: Austria (AUT)
- Sport: Sailing
- Official website: www.segelverband.at

HISTORY
- Year of formation: 1946

DEMOGRAPHICS
- Number of Sailing clubs: 97

AFFILIATIONS
- International federation: World Sailing (WS)
- National Olympic Committee: Austrian Olympic Committee
- National Paralympic Committee: Austrian Paralympic Committee

ELECTED
- President: Dieter Schneider

Head of Administration
- Address: Seegelände 10; A-71000; Neusiedl am See
- Country: Austria
- Secretary General: Stefan Glanz-Michaelis
- Olympic team manager: Matthias Schmid
- Number of staff: 11

FINANCE
- Company status: Association
- Sponsors: AutoFrey, Marinepool, Schenker, Pantaenius, SZIGETI, Robline Ropes

The Austrian Sailing Federation is the national governing body for the sport of sailing in Austria, recognised by World Sailing.

== Notable sailors ==
See Category:Austrian sailors

=== Olympic sailing ===
See Category:Olympic sailors of Austria

=== Offshore sailing ===
See Category:Austrian sailors (sport)
