= Marit Bouwmeester =

Dutch sailor (born 1988)

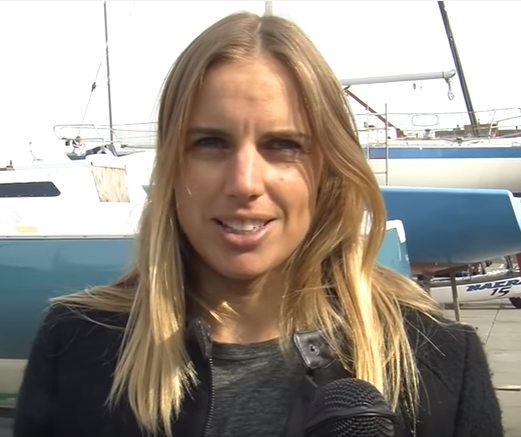
- Bouwmeester in 2016

Personal information
- Full name: Marit Bouwmeester
- Born: 17 June 1988 (age 38) Warten, Netherlands
- Height: 1.77 m (5 ft 10 in)

Sailing career
- Sport: Sailing
- Class: Laser Radial
Medal record
Representing Netherlands
Olympic Games
Gold medal – first place	2016 Rio de Janeiro	Laser Radial
Gold medal – first place	2024 Paris	Laser Radial
Silver medal – second place	2012 London	Laser Radial
Bronze medal – third place	2020 Tokyo	Laser Radial
World Championships
Gold medal – first place	2011 Perth	Laser Radial
Gold medal – first place	2014 Santander	Laser Radial
Gold medal – first place	2017 Medemblik	Laser Radial
Gold medal – first place	2020 Sandringham	Laser Radial
Silver medal – second place	2010 Largs	Laser Radial
Silver medal – second place	2015 Al Mussanah	Laser Radial
Silver medal – second place	2018 Aarhus	Laser Radial
Silver medal – second place	2019 Sakaiminato	Laser Radial

Marit Bouwmeester (Dutch pronunciation: [ˈmaːrɪd ˈbʌuˌmeːstər]; born 17 June 1988) is a Dutch sailor.

Bouwmeester won the gold medal in the Laser Radial class in the 2016 Summer Olympics in Rio de Janeiro and again in the Laser Radial class at the 2024 Paris Summer Olympics, and the silver medal at the 2012 Summer Olympics in Weymouth. In 2017, she won the World Sailor of the Year Award. She competed at the 2020 Summer Olympics in Tokyo 2021, competing in Laser Radial and winning the bronze medal.

Her two gold medals, one silver medal, and one bronze medal make her the most successful female sailor at the Summer Olympics.
