= Alicia Cebrián =

Spanish sailor

Personal information
- Full name: Alicia Cebrián Martínez de Lagos
- Born: 3 February 1983 (age 43) Santa Cruz de Tenerife

Sailing career
- Sport: Sailing
- Club: Real Club Náutico de Tenerife
- Class: Laser Radial (ILCA 6)
Medal record
Women's Sailing
Representing Spain
Mediterranean Games
Silver medal – second place	2013 Mersin	Laser Radial
Bronze medal – third place	2001 Tunis	Laser
Laser European Championships
Gold medal – first place	2012 Hourtin	Laser Radial
Silver medal – second place	2015 Aarhus	Laser Radial
Bronze medal – third place	2011 Helsinki	Laser Radial

Alicia Cebrián Martínez de Lagos (Note: In this Spanish name, the first or paternal surname is Cebrián and the second or maternal family name is Martínez de Lagos.) (born 3 February 1983 in Santa Cruz de Tenerife) is a Spanish Real Club Náutico de Tenerife sailor. She competed in the Laser Radial class event at the 2012 Summer Olympics, where she placed 11th.
