= Tuula Tenkanen =

Finnish sailor (born 1990)

Personal information
- Full name: Tuula Tenkanen
- Nationality: Finland
- Born: 11 August 1990 (age 35) Espoo, Finland
- Height: 1.67 m (5 ft 5 1/2 in)
- Weight: 62 kg (137 lb)

Sailing career
- Sport: Sailing
- Club: Esbo Segelförening
- Coached by: Minna Aalto
- Class: Sailboard

Tuula Tenkanen (born 11 August 1990 in Espoo) is a Finnish sailor, who specialized in one-person dinghy (Laser Radial) class. She represented her nation Finland at the 2008 Summer Olympics, and at the 2020 Summer Olympics.

== Career ==
She trained at Espoo Sailing Club (Finnish: Esbo Segelförening) throughout most of her sporting career under her longtime coach and mentor Minna Aalto. As of September 2014, Tenkanen was ranked sixth in the world for the one-person dinghy class by the International Sailing Federation, following her successes at the European and ISAF World Championships.

Tenkanen qualified for the Finnish squad in the newly introduced Laser Radial class at the 2008 Summer Olympics in Beijing by placing twelfth and receiving a berth from the ISAF World Championships in Auckland, New Zealand. She posted a net score of 128 points to achieve a creditable twenty-second position in a fleet of twenty-eight sailors, edging out Belarus' Tatiana Drozdovskaya by a mere thirteen-point gap on the tenth leg.

Tenkanen sought to compete for the 2012 Summer Olympics in London, but lost the slot to her sailing rival Sari Multala, who later finished seventh in the same class. Two years later, at the 2014 ISAF Sailing World Championships in Santander, Spain, Tenkanen delivered her best career record with a fourth-place finish in the Laser Radial class to secure a spot on the Finnish sailing team for her second Olympic bid in Rio de Janeiro.

She competed at the 2018 ISAF Sailing World Championships, and qualified for the 2020 Summer Olympics.
