= Hannah Snellgrove =

British sailor (born 1990)

Hannah Snellgrove OLY
Personal information
- Full name: Hannah Bethany Snellgrove
- Nationality: British
- Born: 9 July 1990 (age 36) Lymington, Hampshire, England

Sailing career
- Sport: Sailing
- Class: ILCA 6

Hannah Bethany Snellgrove OLY (born 9 July 1990) is a British sailor who has represented her country at multiple world championships and the 2024 Summer Olympics in the ILCA 6 class.

== Career ==
Snellgrove started sailing aged seven at the Salterns club in Lymington as a way of skipping traditional sports in PE sessions. She joined the British Sailing Team in 2011 but missed out on selection for the 2012 Summer Olympics and then, just weeks after the 2014 Sailing World Championships, she was dropped from the national squad.

During the next four years she self-funded her career through performing with her folk band named Bimbling, sailing coaching and working as a reporter at a local newspaper.

Snellgrove crowdfunded to pay for a new boat - raising £7,000 in just three weeks - and found new sponsors before taking part in the 2018 Sailing World Championships in Aarhus, Denmark, where she impressed the selectors enough to get back on the British team.

At the 2019 Women's ILCA 6 World Championship in Japan, Snellgrove secured her best finish to date at the global event coming seventh. However, she missed out on selection for the 2020 Summer Olympics.

In 2022, Snellgrove suffered a back injury which left her considering retirement, but she bounced back to finish 11th at the 2023 Sailing World Championships in The Hague, Netherlands, to secure Great Britain a quota spot for the 2024 Summer Olympics.

She finished 10th at the next edition of the Women's ILCA 6 World Championship in Mar del Plata, Argentina, in January 2024 and the following month was officially named in the team for the Paris Olympics.

At the Olympic regatta, Snellgrove won two of the early races before slipping down the field after a poor set of results in races seven and eight. She eventually finished 12th, missing out on the final day medal race.

== Personal life ==
Snellgrove studied Natural Sciences at Gonville and Caius College at the University of Cambridge achieving a first-class degree.
