= Anna Pohlak =

Estonian sports sailor

Personal information
- Nationality: Estonian
- Born: 1 July 1993 (age 31); Tallinn, Estonia
- Height: 177 cm (5 ft 10 in)
- Weight: 66 kg (146 lb)

Sailing career
- Class(es): Laser Radial, Optimist, Zoom^{8}

Anna Pohlak (born 1 July 1993) is an Estonian sports sailor. At the 2012 Summer Olympics, she competed in the Women's Laser Radial class, finishing in 35th place. She started sailing at the age of eleven and sailed in Optimist and Zoom^{8} classes.
