= Marthe Enger Eide =

Norwegian sailor

Personal information
- Nationality: Norwegian
- Born: 17 November 1989 (age 36) Bærum, Norway

Sport
- Country: Norway
- Sport: Sailing

Marthe Enger Eide (born 17 November 1989) is a Norwegian sailor. She was born in Bærum. She competed at the 2012 Summer Olympics in London in the women's laser radial.
