= Sara Winther =

New Zealand sailor

Sara Winther (born 31 October 1981) is a New Zealand sports sailor.

Winther was born in 1981 in New Plymouth, New Zealand. At the 2012 Summer Olympics, she competed in the Women's Laser Radial class, finishing in 20th place.
