= Latvian Sailing Union =

Sports governing body in Latvia

Latvian Sailing Union LSU
- IOC nation: Latvia (LAT)
- Sport: Sailing
- Official website: www.sailinglatvia.lv

HISTORY
- Year of formation: 1926

DEMOGRAPHICS
- Number of affiliated Sailing clubs: 11

AFFILIATIONS
- International federation: International Sailing Federation (ISAF)
- ISAF members page: www.sailing.org/about-isaf/mna/latvia.php
- Continental association: EUROSAF
- National Olympic Committee: Latvian Olympic Committee

ELECTED
- President: Ansis Dāle
- Board: Valters Romans; Jānis Preiss; Valdis Vancovičs; Rihards Vaivods; Jānis Grīslis

SECRETARIAT
- Address: Grostonas iela 6B, Riga LV-1013
- Secretary General: Oskars Krūze
- Honorary President: Māris Gailis

FINANCE
- Company status: Foundation

Latvian Sailing Union (Latvian: Latvijas Burāšanas savienība) is the national governing body for the sport of sailing in Latvia, recognised by World Sailing. It was founded in 1926. Twenty six organizations (11 associations, 11 yacht clubs and four others) are members of the union.

== See also ==
- Latvian Sailing Association
