= Royal Belgium Sailing Federation =

Sports governing body in Belgium

Royal Belgium Sailing Federation Belgian Sailing
- IOC nation: Belgium (BEL)
- Sport: Sailing
- Official website: www.belgiansailing.be

HISTORY
- Year of formation: -

DEMOGRAPHICS
- Number of Sailing clubs: -

AFFILIATIONS
- International federation: World Sailing (WS)
- WS members page: www.sailing.org/about-isaf/mna/belgium.php
- Continental association: EUROSAF
- National Olympic Committee: Belgian Olympic Committee

ELECTED
- President: Peter Van den Bosche

SECRETARIAT
- Address: Zuiderlaan 13; B-9000 Gent
- Country: Belgium
- Secretary General: Philippe Godeau

FINANCE
- Company status: Association

The Royal Belgium Sailing Federation is the national governing body for the sport of sailing in Belgium, recognised by the World Sailing. The federation consists of the Flemish-speaking Wind en Watersport Vlaanderen and the French-speaking Fédération Francophone du yachting Belge.

== Classes ==
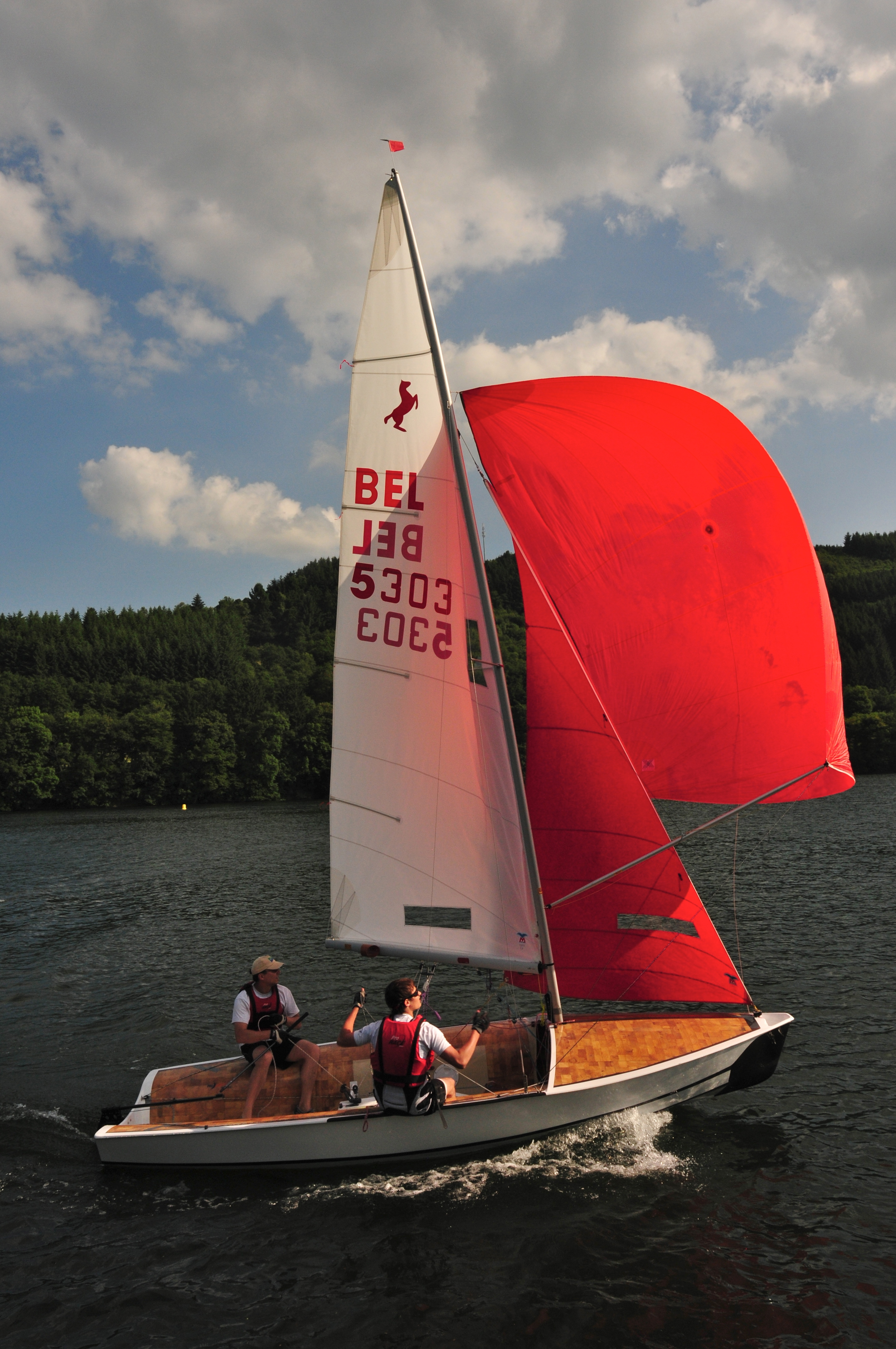
Ponant in 2013

The following class organisations are affiliated to the Royal Belgium Sailing Federation:

- 29er
- 470
- 490
- 49er
- 49er FX
- Cadet
- Dragon
- Europe
- Finn
- Fireball
- Flying Fifteen
- ILCA (4, 6, and 7)
- International A-class catamaran
- IRC
- iQFoil
- J/80
- Kitefoil
- multihull classes
- Nacra 15
- Nacra 17
- Neo 495
- OK
- Optimist
- Ponant
- Raceboard
- Sailing skate
- Snipe
- Spirou
- Techno 293
- windsurfing classes

== Notable sailors ==
See Category:Belgian sailors

=== Olympic sailing ===
See Category:Olympic sailors for Belgium

=== Offshore sailing ===
See Category:Belgian sailors (sport)
