= Erika Reineke =

American sailor

Personal information
- Nationality: American
- Born: 4 November 1993 (age 32) Fort Lauderdale, Florida

Sport
- Sport: Sailing
- College team: Boston College

Erika Reineke (born 4 November, 1993) is an American sailor. She competed in the Laser Radial event at the 2024 Summer Olympics, where she placed 9th.

== Biography ==
Reineke began sailing in the Optimist dinghy at the age of eight through the Lauderdale Yacht Club program. As a youth competitor, she won multiple national titles and represented the United States internationally in the Optimist class before transitioning to the ILCA 6 (Laser Radial) dinghy.

In the ILCA 6 class, she achieved early international success at youth level, winning medals at the ISAF Youth World Championships and securing multiple world youth titles. She later competed at collegiate level for Boston College, where she became one of the most successful sailors in the program's history, winning multiple U.S. collegiate championships and earning several national awards, including recognition as College Sailor of the Year finalist and Quantum Women's Sailor of the Year.

After graduating in 2017, Reineke began competing full-time on the international circuit in Olympic-class sailing. She won events on the World Cup circuit and was named Rolex Yachtswoman of the Year in 2017. Although she did not qualify for the 2020 Olympic Games, she remained active in international competition, including a period competing in the 49er FX class before returning to ILCA 6.

She won the U.S. Olympic Trials in the ILCA 6 class and represented the United States at the 2024 Summer Olympics in Paris, where she finished 10th.

She was strategist for the United States team at 2026 SailGP.
