= Elizabeth Yin =

Singaporean sailor

Personal information
- Born: August 8, 1991 (age 34)

Sport
- Country: Singapore
- Sport: Sailing

Elizabeth Yin Yin Yue is a Singaporean sports sailor. At the 2012 Summer Olympics, she competed in the Women's Laser Radial class, finishing in 24th place. She also competed in the same event at the 2016 Summer Olympics, finishing in 26th place. She has also competed in two sailing World Championships (2011, 2014), six Laser Radial World Championships (2008, 2010, 2012, 2013, 2015 and 2016) and two Byte-class World Championships (2005 and 2006).
