= Ashley Stoddart =

Australian sailor

Personal information
- Nationality: Australian
- Born: 10 June 1993 (age 33)

Sport
- Sport: Sailing

Ashley Stoddart (born 10 June 1993) is an Australian competitive sailor.

She competed at the 2016 Summer Olympics in Rio de Janeiro, in the women's Laser Radial.
