= Paloma Schmidt =

Peruvian sports sailor (born 1987)

Personal information
- Full name: Paloma Isabel Schmidt Gutiérrez
- Born: 24 January 1987 (age 38); Lima, Peru
- Height: 165 cm (5 ft 5 in)
- Weight: 63 kg (139 lb)

Sailing career
- Class: Laser

Paloma Isabel Schmidt Gutiérrez (Note: In this Spanish name, the first or paternal surname is Schmidt and the second or maternal family name is Gutiérrez.) (born 24 January 1987 in Lima) is a Peruvian sports sailor.

At the 2008 and 2012 Summer Olympics, she competed in the Women's Laser Radial class, finishing in 26th and 39th place respectively.
