= Bulgarian Sailing Federation =

Governing body of sailing in Bulgaria

- IOC nation: Bulgaria (BUL)
- Sport: Sailing
- Official website: www.bulsaf.bg

HISTORY
- Year of formation: 1958

DEMOGRAPHICS
- Number of Sailing clubs: Approx. 40

AFFILIATIONS
- International federation: International Sailing Federation (ISAF)
- ISAF member since: 1960
- Continental association: EUROSAF
- National Olympic Committee: Bulgarian Olympic Committee

ELECTED
- President: Igor Rachkovski

SECRETARIAT
- Secretary General: Maxim Koshkalda

FINANCE
- Company status: Non Profit Organisation

The Bulgarian Sailing Federation is the national governing body for the sport of sailing in Bulgaria, recognised by the International Sailing Federation.

== Famous Sailors ==
See Category:Bulgarian sailors

=== Olympic sailing ===
See Category:Olympic sailors of Bulgaria

== Yacht clubs ==
See Category:Yacht clubs in Bulgaria
