= Turkish Sailing Federation =

Turkish Sailing Federation Türkiye Yelken Federasyonu TYF
- IOC nation: Turkey (TUR)
- Sport: Sailing
- Official website: www.tyf.org.tr
- Year of formation: May 25, 1957
- International federation: International Sailing Federation (ISAF)
- ISAF members page: www.sailing.org/about-isaf/mna/turkey.php
- ISAF member since: 1932
- National Olympic Committee: Turkish Olympic Committee
- National Paralympic Committee: Turkish Paralympic Committee
- President: Özlem Akdurak
- Address: Ulus İş Hanı Kat 2; Ulus PK:06050; Ankara
- Country: Turkey
- Secretary General: Fatih Umur ERKAN
- Company status: Association

The Turkish Sailing Federation (Turkish: Türkiye Yelken Federasyonu) (TYF) is the national governing body for the sport of sailing in Turkey, recognised by the International Sailing Federation.

Following sailboard and boat classes are officially registered by the federation:

- 420
- 470
- Dragon
- Europe
- Finn
- Laser
- Mistral One Design
- Optimist
- Pirate
- Yacht
- Radio-controlled racing sailboat

== Famous sailors ==
See Category:Turkish sailors

=== Offshore sailing ===
- Nazlı Çağla Dönertaş (born 1991), 2012 Olympic qualified female yachtracer
