= Norwegian Sailing Federation =

Sports governing body in Norway

- IOC nation: Norway (NOR)
- Sport: Sailing
- Official website: www.norgesseilforbund.org

HISTORY
- Year of formation: 1970

DEMOGRAPHICS
- Number of affiliated Sailing clubs: Approx. 120

AFFILIATIONS
- International federation: World Sailing (WS)
- WS members page: web.archive.org/web/20120425024028/http://www.sailing.org/about-isaf/mna/norway.php
- National Paralympic Committee: Norwegian Olympic Committee

ELECTED
- President: Peter L Larsen

SECRETARIAT
- Address: Ullevaal Stadion; NO-0840 Oslo
- Country: Norway
- Secretary General: Espen Guttormsen

FINANCE
- Company status: Association

The Norwegian Sailing Federation (Norwegian: Norges Seilforbund) is the national governing body for the sport of sailing in Norway, recognised by World Sailing.

== Classes ==
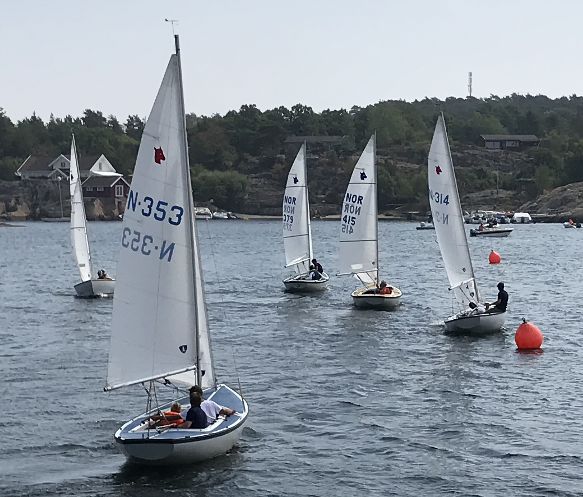
Killings in 2003

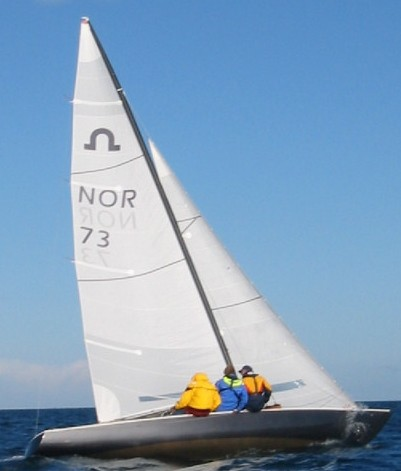
Soling in 2004

The following class organisations are affiliated to the Norwegian Sailing Federation:

- 11:Metre One Design
- 12.5 m^{2} cruiser
- 2.4 Metre
- 29er, 49er, and 49er FX
- Albin Express
- Andunge
- BB 11
- Dragon
- Esailing
- Europe
- Finn
- Grimstadjolle
- H-boat
- Half ton
- IF-boat
- ILCA (4, 6, and 7)
- J/70
- Killing
- Knarr
- Kragerøterne
- Melges 24
- NOR Rating
- Optimist
- Oselvar
- Princess
- radio sailing classes
- RS Feva
- shorthanded sailing
- Snipe
- Soling
- Waszp
- windsurfing classes
- X-35
- Yngling

== Notable sailors ==
See Category:Norwegian sailors

=== Olympic sailing ===
See Category:Olympic sailors for Norway

=== Offshore sailing ===
See Category:Norwegian sailors (sport)
