= Alison Young (sailor) =

British sailor (born 1987)

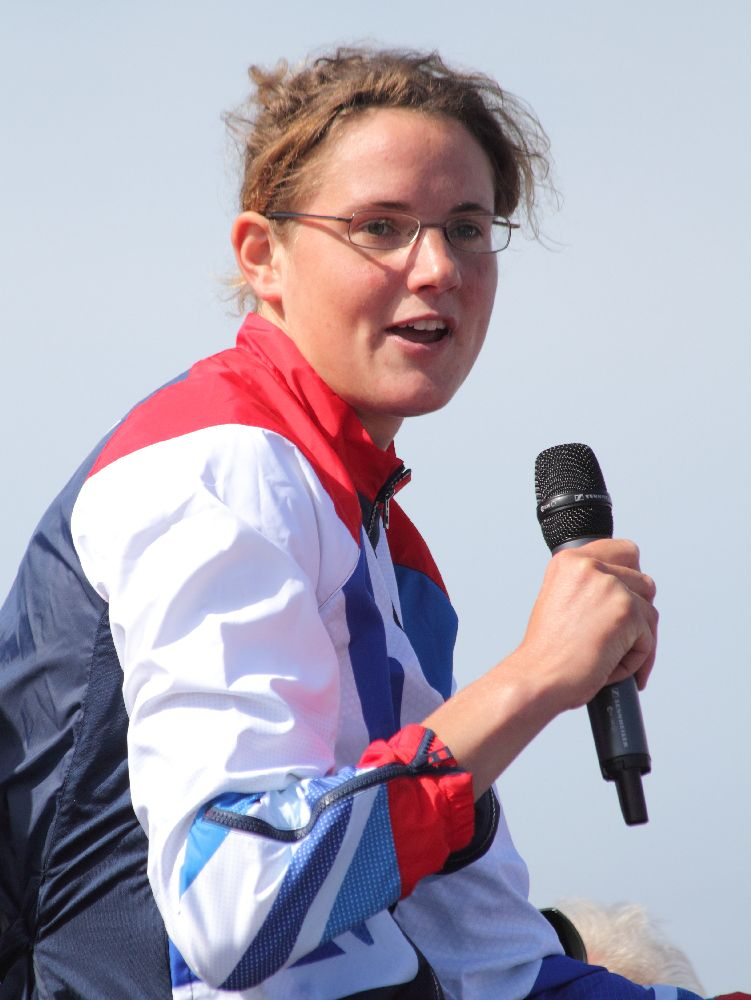
- Young at the 2012 Olympic Parade in Weymouth

Personal information
- Nationality: United Kingdom
- Born: 29 May 1987 (age 39) Wolverhampton, England

Sailing career
- Sport: Sailing
- Class: Laser Radial
Medal record
Sailing
Representing Great Britain
World Championships
Gold medal – first place	2016 Nuevo Vallarta	Laser Radial
Bronze medal – third place	2019 Sakaiminato	Laser Radial

Alison Young (born 29 May 1987) is a British sailor. She was the first British woman to be world champion in a solo Olympic dinghy class.

== Life ==
Young was born in Wolverhampton, England on 29 May 1987. She started sailing on a lake in the River Severn valley when she was nine at the Trimpley Sailing Club.

She competed in the Laser Radial class event at the 2012 Summer Olympics where she placed 5th.

At the 2016 Laser World Championships, she won gold in the laser radial class and in doing so became the first British woman to become world champion in a solo Olympic dinghy class. Her best World Championship performance before this was 4th in 2012.

Young competed at the Rio 2016 Olympics, finishing 8th overall. She competed at the 2020 Summer Olympics in the Women's Laser Radial class and she finished tenth.
