= Annalise Murphy =

Irish sailor

Personal information
- Born: 1 February 1990 (age 36) Rathfarnham, Dublin, Ireland
- Height: 6.1 ft 0 in (1.86 m)

Sailing career
- Sport: Sailing
- Coached by: Rory Fitzpatrick
Medal record
Representing Ireland
Olympic Games
Silver medal – second place	2016 Rio de Janeiro	Laser Radial
Laser European Championships
Gold medal – first place	2013 Laser European & World Championships	2013 Dublin

Annalise Murphy (born 1 February 1990) is an Irish sailor who won a silver medal in the 2016 Summer Olympics. She competed at the 2020 Summer Olympics in Tokyo 2021, in Laser Radial.

== Life ==
She is a native of a suburb of Dublin. Her mother Cathy McAleavy, competed as a sailor in the 1988 Summer Olympics. competing in the 470 class at the Olympics in Seoul in 1988.

== Career ==
Murphy competed at the 2012 Summer Olympics in the Women's Laser Radial class. She won her first four days of sailing at the London Olympics and, on the fifth day, came in 8th and 19th position. On the sixth day of sailing, she came 2nd and 10th and slipped down to second, just one point behind the Belgian world number one. She was a very strong contender for the gold medal but in the medal race she was overtaken on the final leg by her competitors and finished in 4th, her personal best at a world-class regatta.

Murphy won her first major medal at an international event when she won gold at the 2013 European Sailing Championship. She was nominated for the 2013 RTÉ Sports Person of the Year in December 2013.

On 16 August 2016, Murphy won the silver medal in the Laser Radial at the 2016 Summer Olympics. In December 2016, she was honoured as the Irish Times/Sport Ireland 2016 Sportswoman of the Year.

In 2017, Annalise Murphy was chosen as the grand marshal of the Dublin St Patrick's Day parade in recognition of her achievement at the Rio Olympics.

== Volvo Ocean Race 2017-18 ==
In a change of career direction, Annalise joined Dee Cafari's team competing as a team member on a Volvo 65 yacht.

== Significant results ==
2016: Summer Olympics, Rio de Janeiro, Brazil – Silver

2013: European Championships, Dublin, Ireland – Gold

2012: Summer Olympics, London, UK – 4th

2011: World Championships, Perth, Australia – 6th

2010: Skandia Sail for Gold regatta – 10th

2010: Became the first woman to win the Irish National Championships.

2009: World Championships – 8th

== Television and radio ==
On 11 August 2012, Murphy was a guest on Saturday Night with Miriam. On 15 May 2013, she was a guest on The Ray D'Arcy Show on Today FM, and was interviewed by Alan Hughes on TV3's Ireland AM. She appeared on The Late Late Show on 2 September 2016.
