= Chinese Yachting Association =

Governing body of sailing in China

Chinese Yachting Association CYA
- IOC nation: China (CHN)
- Sport: Sailing
- Official website: sailboarding.sport.org.cn

AFFILIATIONS
- International federation: International Sailing Federation (ISAF)
- ISAF members page: www.sailing.org/about-isaf/mna/china.php
- National Olympic Committee: Chinese Olympic Committee
- National Paralympic Committee: Chinese Paralympic Committee

ELECTED
- President: Wang Jun

SECRETARIAT
- Address: Weitu Mansion; 8, Zuoanmennei Street; Chongwen.dis; Beijing
- Country: China, Pr
- Secretary General: Li Quanhai

FINANCE
- Company status: Association

The Chinese Yachting Association is the national governing body for the sport of sailing in China, recognised by the International Sailing Federation.

== Notable sailors ==
See Category:Chinese sailors

=== Olympic sailing ===
See Category:Olympic sailors for China

=== Offshore sailing ===
See Category:Chinese sailors (sport)

== Yacht clubs ==
See Category:Yacht clubs in China
