= Japan Sailing Federation =

Japan Sailing Federation JSAF
- IOC nation: Japan (JPN)
- Sport: Sailing
- Official website: www.jsaf.or.jp
- Year of formation: 1932
- Former names: Japan Yacht Association
- International federation: International Sailing Federation (ISAF)
- ISAF members page: www.sailing.org/about/members/mnas/japan.php
- National Olympic Committee: Japanese Olympic Committee
- National Paralympic Committee: Japanese Paralympic Committee
- President: Hirobumi Kawano
- Address: 1-1-1 Jinnan; Shibuya, Tokyo
- Country: Japan
- Chief Executive: Shoichi Maeda

The Japan Sailing Federation (日本セーリング連盟, Nihon Sēringu Renmei) is the governing body for the sport of sailing in Japan, recognised by the International Sailing Federation.
