= Tatiana Drozdovskaya =

Belarusian sailor

Personal information
- Full name: Tatiana Drozdovskaya
- Nationality: Belarus
- Born: 6 December 1978 (age 47) Minsk, Belarus

Sailing career
- Sport: Sailing
- Classes: Europe, Laser Radial,
Medal record
Sailing
Representing Belarus
World Championships
Gold medal – first place	2007 Cascais	Laser Radial

Tatiana Drozdovskaya (Belarusian: Таццяна Яўгенаўна Драздоўская; Łacinka: Tacciana Jaŭhienaŭna Drazdoŭskaja; born 6 December 1978 in Minsk) is a Belarusian sailor. She has competed in six editions of the Olympic Games.

== Results ==
=== World Championships ===
In 2007, she won the Laser Radial world championship.

=== Olympics ===
Games	Class	Position	Ref.
2000 Summer Olympics	Europe class	24	
2004 Summer Olympics	Europe class	20	
2008 Summer Olympics	Laser Radial	23	
2012 Summer Olympics	Laser Radial	15	
2020 Summer Olympics	Laser Radial	19	
2020 Summer Olympics	Laser Radial	21	
