= Hellenic Sailing Federation =

National governing body for the sport of sailing in Greece

Hellenic Sailing Federation HSF
- IOC nation: Greece (GRE)
- Sport: Sailing
- Official website: www.eio.gr

HISTORY
- Year of formation: 1951

DEMOGRAPHICS
- Number of affiliated Sailing clubs: Approx. 160

AFFILIATIONS
- International federation: International Sailing Federation (ISAF)
- ISAF members page: www.eio.gr
- National Olympic Committee: Hellenic Olympic Committee

ELECTED
- President: Antonis Dimitrakopoulos

SECRETARIAT
- Secretary General: Apostolos Papathanasiou

FINANCE
- Company status: Federation

The Hellenic Sailing Federation is the national governing body for the sport of sailing in Greece, recognised by the International Sailing Federation.

== Notable sailors ==
See Category:Greek sailors

=== Olympic sailing ===
See also Category:Olympic sailors for Greece

=== Offshore sailing ===
See Category:Greek sailors (sport)

== Yacht clubs ==
See Category:Yacht clubs in Greece
