= Argentine Yachting Federation =

Sports governing body in Argentina

- IOC nation: Argentina (ARG)
- Sport: Sailing
- Official website: www.fay.org

HISTORY
- Year of formation: 1928

AFFILIATIONS
- International federation: International Sailing Federation (ISAF)
- ISAF members page: www.sailing.org/about-isaf/mna/argentina.php

ELECTED
- President: Pablo Masseroni

SECRETARIAT
- Address: Buenos Aires
- Secretary General: Luis F. Velasco
- Olympic team manager: Alejandro Cloos

The Argentine Yachting Federation (Spanish: Federación Argentina de Yachting) is the national governing body for the sport of sailing in Argentina, recognised by the International Sailing Federation.

== History ==
The Federation was formed in 1928 with the name Yacht Racing National Union, changing name to Yacht Racing Argentinian Federation in 1934 and finally to Argentine Yachting Federation in 1970.

The national governing body for the sport of sailing in Argentina was previously the Argentine Yacht Club. The Argentine Yachting Federation took over the function in 1998.

Since 1966, the Federation had been organizing the annual Yachting Day in Mar del Plata. In 1988, the Federation started to organize the Campeonato de Verano in Mar del Plata, which eventually grew into the International Week of Yachting.

== Description ==
The Argentine Yachting Federeation is affiliated with World Sailing.

== Famous sailors ==
See Category:Argentine sailors

=== Olympic sailing ===
See Category:Olympic sailors of Argentina

=== Offshore sailing ===
See Category:Argentine sailors (sport)
