= Brenda Bowskill =

Canadian sailor

Brenda Bowskill (born 21 April 1992 in Toronto, Ontario) is a Canadian sailor. Bowskill finished in eighth place at the 2015 Pan American Games in the Laser Radial event. Bowskill has also competed at the 2016 Summer Olympics where she placed 16th in the Laser Radial.
