= Belarus Sailing Federation =

Sports governing body in Belarus

Belarus Sailing Federation BSF
- IOC nation: Belarus (BLR)
- Sport: Sailing
- Official website: www.yachting.by

HISTORY
- Year of formation: 1963

DEMOGRAPHICS
- Number of Sailing clubs: Approx. 5

AFFILIATIONS
- International federation: International Sailing Federation (ISAF)
- ISAF members page: www.sailing.org/about-isaf/mna/belarus.php
- ISAF member since: 1992
- Continental association: EUROSAF
- National Olympic Committee: Belarus Olympic Committee

ELECTED
- President: Igor Rachkovski

SECRETARIAT
- Address: Minsk
- Secretary General: Maxim Koshkalda

FINANCE
- Company status: Association

The Belarus Sailing Federation (Belarusian: Белорусская Федерация Парусного Спорта) is the national governing body for the sport of sailing in Belarus, recognised by World Sailing.
