= Royal Spanish Sailing Federation =

Spanish national governing body for sport of sailing

- IOC nation: Spain (ESP)
- Sport: Sailing
- Official website: www.rfev.es

AFFILIATIONS
- International federation: World Sailing (WS)
- WS members page: www.sailing.org/about-isaf/mna/spain.php
- National Olympic Committee: Spanish Olympic Committee

ELECTED
- Patron: Felipe VI of Spain
- President: Julia Casanueva
- Address: Madrid

REGIONS
- Federación Madrileña; Federación de Castilla de Mancha; Federación de Castilla y León; Federación Extremeña; Federación Navarra; Federación Aragonesa; Federación de Vela del Principado de Asturias

The Royal Spanish Sailing Federation (Spanish: Real Federación Española de Vela, RFEV) is the national governing body for the sport of sailing in Spain, recognised by World Sailing. The federation is based in Madrid with a high performance centre located at Santander.

== Classes ==
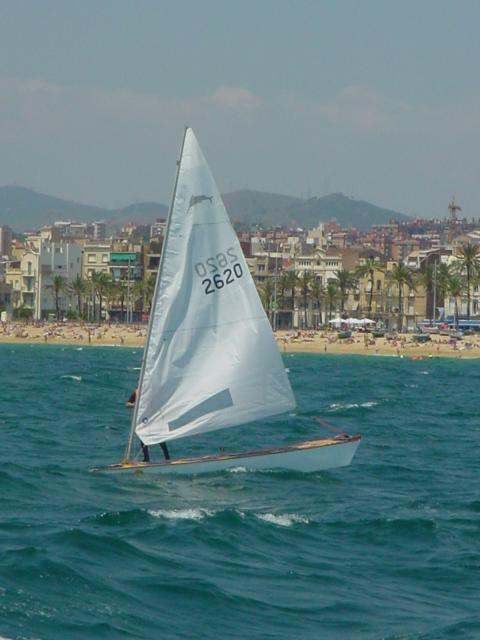
Sailing skate in 2002

The following class organisations are affiliated to the Royal Spanish Sailing Federation:

- 2.4 Metre
- 29er
- 420
- 470
- 49er
- catamarans
- Clásicos y época para los amantes de la tradición
- Dragon
- Europe
- Finn
- Flying Dutchman
- Formula Kite
- Formula Windsurfing
- Hansa 303
- ILCA (4, 6, and 7)
- International Funboard
- IRC
- iQFoil
- J/70
- J/80
- Kiteboarding Expression
- Maxi yachts
- Nacra 15
- Nacra 17
- ORC
- One Metre
- Optimist
- Raceboard
- Rating Internacional
- Sailing skate
- Snipe
- Soling
- Techno 293
- Techno 293+
- TwinTip Racing
- Vaurien
- Windsurfer

== Yacht clubs ==
See Category:Yacht clubs in Spain

== Notable sailors ==
See Category:Spanish sailors

=== Olympic sailing ===
See Category:Olympic sailors for Spain

=== Offshore sailing ===
See Category:Spanish sailors (sport)
