= Finnish Sailing and Boating Federation =

- IOC nation: Finland (FIN)
- Sport: Sailing
- Official website: www.spv.fi

HISTORY
- Year of formation: 1906

AFFILIATIONS
- International federation: World Sailing (WS)
- WS members page: www.sailing.org/about-isaf/mna/finland.php
- Continental association: EUROSAF
- National Olympic Committee: Finnish Olympic Committee

ELECTED
- President: Jan Jansson

SECRETARIAT
- Secretary General: Jan Thorström

The Finnish Sailing and Boating Federation (Finnish: Suomen Purjehdus ja Veneily, SPV; Swedish: Segling och Båtsport i Finland) is the national governing body for the sport of sailing in Finland, recognised by the World Sailing.

== Classes ==
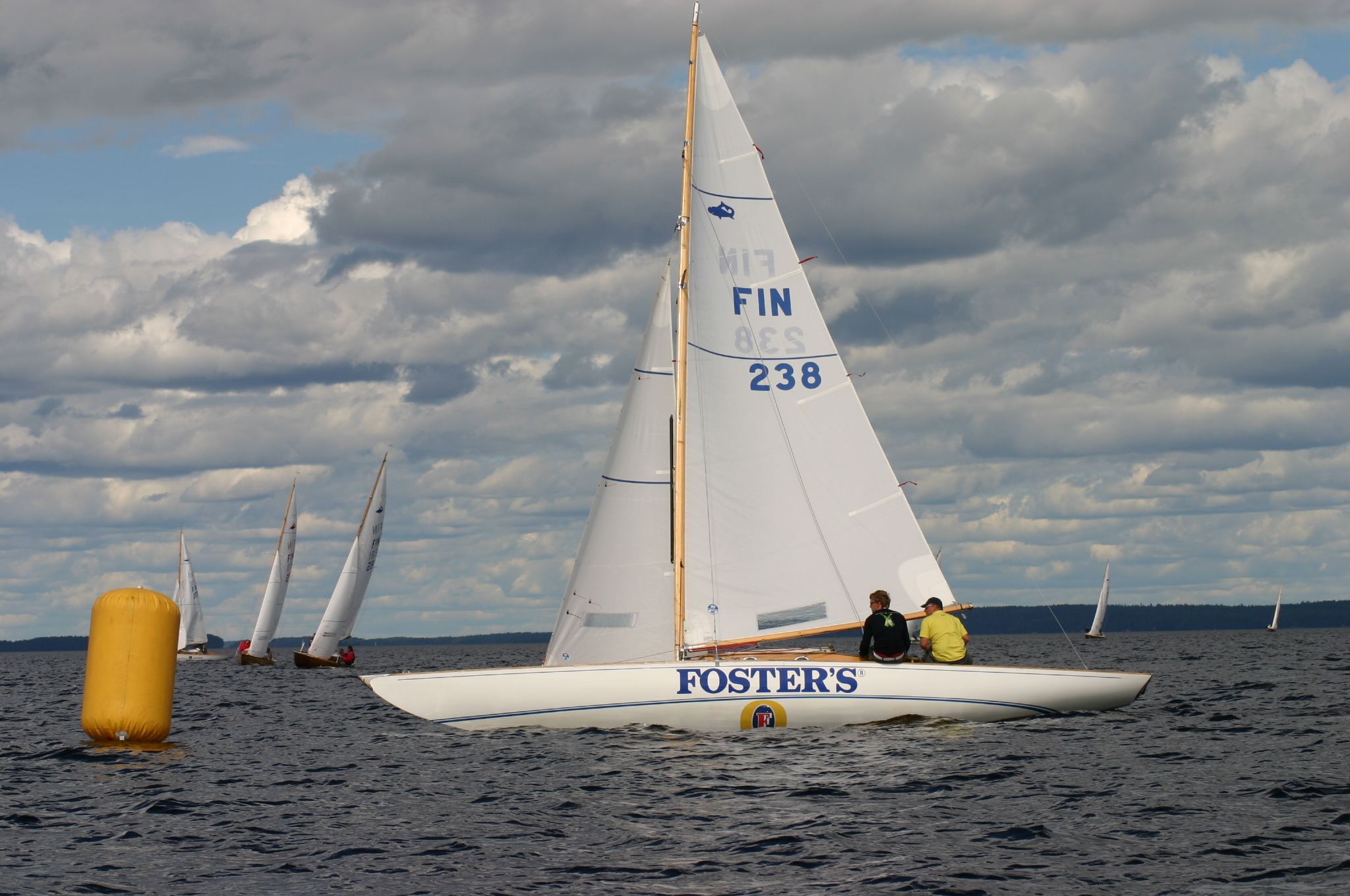
Hai in 2005

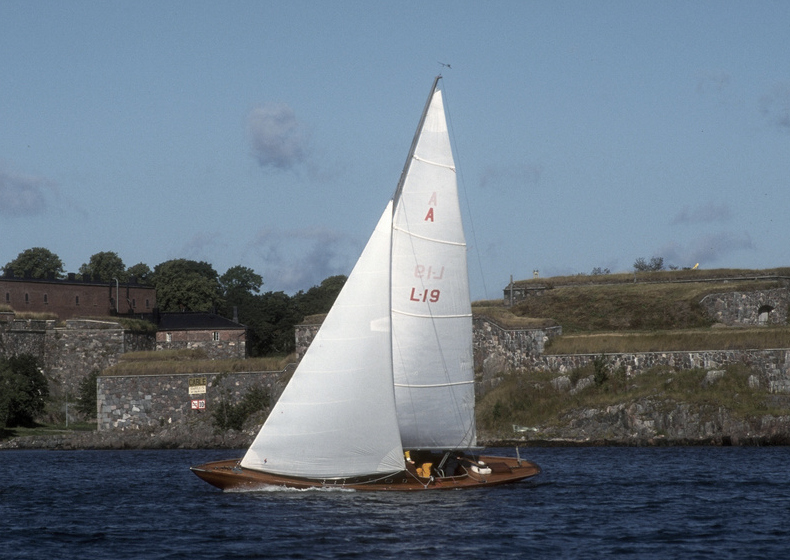
Särklass A in 2010

The following class organisations are affiliated to the Finnish Sailing and Boating Federation:

- 2.4 Metre
- 29er, 49er, 49er FX
- 5 Metre
- 5.5 Metre
- 505
- 6 Metre
- 8 Metre
- Albin Express
- Avance 36
- Dragon
- Europe
- Finn
- Finn Express 64
- First 31.7
- Formula 18
- H-35
- H-boat
- Hai
- hydrofoil classes
- ILCA (4, 6, and 7)
- International DN
- IRC
- J/70
- Joe 17
- Lightning
- match racing
- Melges 24
- Monark 606
- Nordic Folkboat
- offshore sailing
- Optimist
- radio sailing classes
- Särklass A
- SB20
- Snipe
- Star
- TP 52
- Windmill
- Windsurfer
- windsurfing and kiteboarding classes
- X-99
- Zoom 8

== Notable sailors ==
See Category:Finnish sailors

=== Olympic sailing ===
See Category:Olympic sailors for Finland

=== Offshore sailing ===
See Category:Finnish sailors (sport)

== Yacht clubs ==
See Category:Yacht clubs in Finland
