= Nazlı Çağla Dönertaş =

Turkish yacht racer

Personal information
- Nationality: Turkish
- Born: March 1, 1991 (age 35) Istanbul, Turkey
- Education: Okan University
- Height: 1.74 m (5 ft 9 in) (2012)
- Weight: 70 kg (150 lb) (2012)

Sport
- Country: Turkey
- Sport: Sailing
- Event: Laser Radial
- Club: Fenerbahçe Sailing
- Coached by: Kemal Muslubas / Begüm Güngör
Medal record
Sailing
Representing Turkey
Mediterranean Games
Bronze medal – third place	2013 Mersin	Women's Laser Radial
Balkan Championships
Gold medal – first place	2010 Burgaz	Laser
Gold medal – first place	2011 Izmit	Laser
Eurolymp Week
Bronze medal – third place	2010 Athens	Laser

Nazlı Çağla Dönertaş (born March 1, 1991) is a Turkish yacht racer. The 1.73 m (5 ft 8 in) tall athlete at 69 kg (152 lb) is a student of architecture at the Okan University in Istanbul.

== Biography ==
Dönertaş was born on March 1, 1991, in Istanbul, Turkey. She began with sailing sport in 2004 in Marmaris Yacht Club and transferred in 2007 to Fenerbahçe Sailing in Istanbul, where she is coached by Kemal Muslubas and Begüm Güngör.

She became national champion in the Women's 470 class at the Turkish Championships held on September 9–13, 2008 off Çayırova, Kocaeli Province. She finished first in the Women's Laser Radial class at the 2010 Turkish Sailing Championships held off Bodrum, Muğla Province. She repeated her success in the Overall and Women's category at the 2011 Turkish Sailing Championships held off Didim, Province.

Dönertaş obtained her first international success with a bronze medal in the Women's Laser Radial class at the 2010 Athens Eurolymp Week in Greece. She became champion in the Women's Laser Radial class at the 2010 Balkan & Open Sailing Championship off Burgas, Bulgaria. At the 2011 Balkan & Open Sailing Championship in the Gulf of Izmit, Kocaeli Province, she won again the gold medal in the Laser radial class. In May 2012, she placed 5th at the Delta Lloyd Regatta 2012 off Medemblik, Netherlands.

She qualified to participate at the 2012 Summer Olympics. At the 2012 Olympics, she finished in 29th place.

At the 2013 World Laser Radial Championship, she finished in 12th. At the 2016 World Laser Radial Championship, she finished in 8th. That year, she also qualified for the Olympics, where she finished in 15th.

== Achievements ==
Year	Competition	Venue	Position	Event	Notes
Representing Turkey
2008	Turkish Sailing Championships	Çayırova, Turkey	1st	470	
2010	Turkish Sailing Championships	Bodrum, Turkey	1st	Laser Radial	
2010	Athens Eurolympic Week	Athens, Greece	3rd	Laser Radial	
2010	Balkan & Open Sailing Championship	Burgas, Bulgaria	1st	Laser Radial	
2011	Balkan & Open Sailing Championship	İzmit, Turkey	1st	Laser Radial	
2012	Delta Lloyd Regatta	Medemblik, Netherlands	5th	Laser Radial	
2013	Mediterranean Games	Mersin, Turkey	3rd	Laser Radial	
