= Sail Canada =

Governing body for sport sailing in Canada

- Sport: Sailing
- Jurisdiction: Canada
- Founded: 1931
- Headquarters: Kingston, Ontario
- CEO: Don Adams
- Sponsor: Sport Canada

Official website
- sailing.ca
- (Canada)

Sail Canada (formerly the Canadian Yachting Association) is Canada's governing body for the sport of sailing. Sail Canada is a "Member National Authority" of World Sailing . Organization of sailing in Canada is divided into four groups: yacht clubs, Provincial Sailing Associations, class associations, and Sail Canada itself.

Yachting and sailing clubs may provide their members with moorage for their boats, boat launch facilities, organize regattas, put on social functions, and/or provide training to children and/or adults. There are ten Provincial Sailing Associations (PSA) that are responsible for organizing instructor courses, registering keelboats and providing PHRF rating certificates and sail numbers, and training provincial team athletes.

Class associations (such as the Laser class) are responsible for measuring and registering one-design boats, and organizing regional, national, and international regattas. Sail Canada is responsible for coaching national team athletes, including Olympic sailors, designing sailing and power boating courses, and registering and insuring instructors.

== Sailing instruction ==
Until 2012 there were seven sailing levels for dinghies:

- White Sail I, II, III teach sailing basics, including points of sail, how to capsize, and sail trim;
- Bronze IV and V teach more advanced sailing skills, including spinnaker, and trapeze;
- Silver VI teaches basic racing; and
- Gold VII teaches advanced racing.

Since 2012, the above levels have been renamed:

- CANSail 1 (essentially equivalent to White Sail I and II)
- CANSail 2 (White Sail III)
- CANSail 3 (Bronze IV)
- CANSail 4 (Bronze Sail V)
- CANSail 5 (Silver Sail VI)
- CANSail 6 (Gold VII)

CANSail levels 1 though 6 are offered to youth, while adult learners are limited to CANSail levels 1 through 4. Trapeze and spinnaker skills are separately taught through respectively CANSail Wires and CANSail Chutes courses.

Sailing on keelboats and yachts is taught as part of the "Cruising Scheme", which has four levels:

- Start Keelboat Sailing. This is an optional, abbreviated version of the Basic Cruising Course intended to teach students "to be able to sail safely as crew of a sloop rigged keelboat 6 to 12 meters with an outboard or inboard motor in 5 - 20 knots (not gusting over 25 knots) of wind by day";
- Basic Cruising. Graduates will "be able to cruise safely in familiar waters as both skipper and crew of a sloop rigged keelboat of 6 to 10 meters with an outboard or inboard motor in moderate wind and sea conditions by day";
- Intermediate Cruising. Graduates will "be able to cruise safely in familiar waters as both skipper and crew of a sailing yacht of 9 to 12 meters, sloop rigged with an inboard engine, in moderate wind and sea conditions by day. The standard emphasizes on-the-water skills at a level acceptable for bare boat chartering for extended cruises in coastal waters"; and
- Advanced Cruising. Graduates will "be able to act safely as skipper and crew of a sailing cruiser of 10 – 15 meters, any modern rig and inboard engine, operating within 100 miles of shore by day and night in coastal or inland water in any weather".

Although one further level is specified by the Cruising Scheme, as of 2017 it is not offered by any Sail Canada school. This is the Offshore Cruising level, which requires students to demonstrate the ability "to safely act as skipper and crew in a sailing cruiser on an offshore passage navigated by celestial and electronic means without visual reference to terrestrial objects".
