= Laser Radial =

(ILCA 6) Womans single-handed Olympic sailing class

- Class symbol

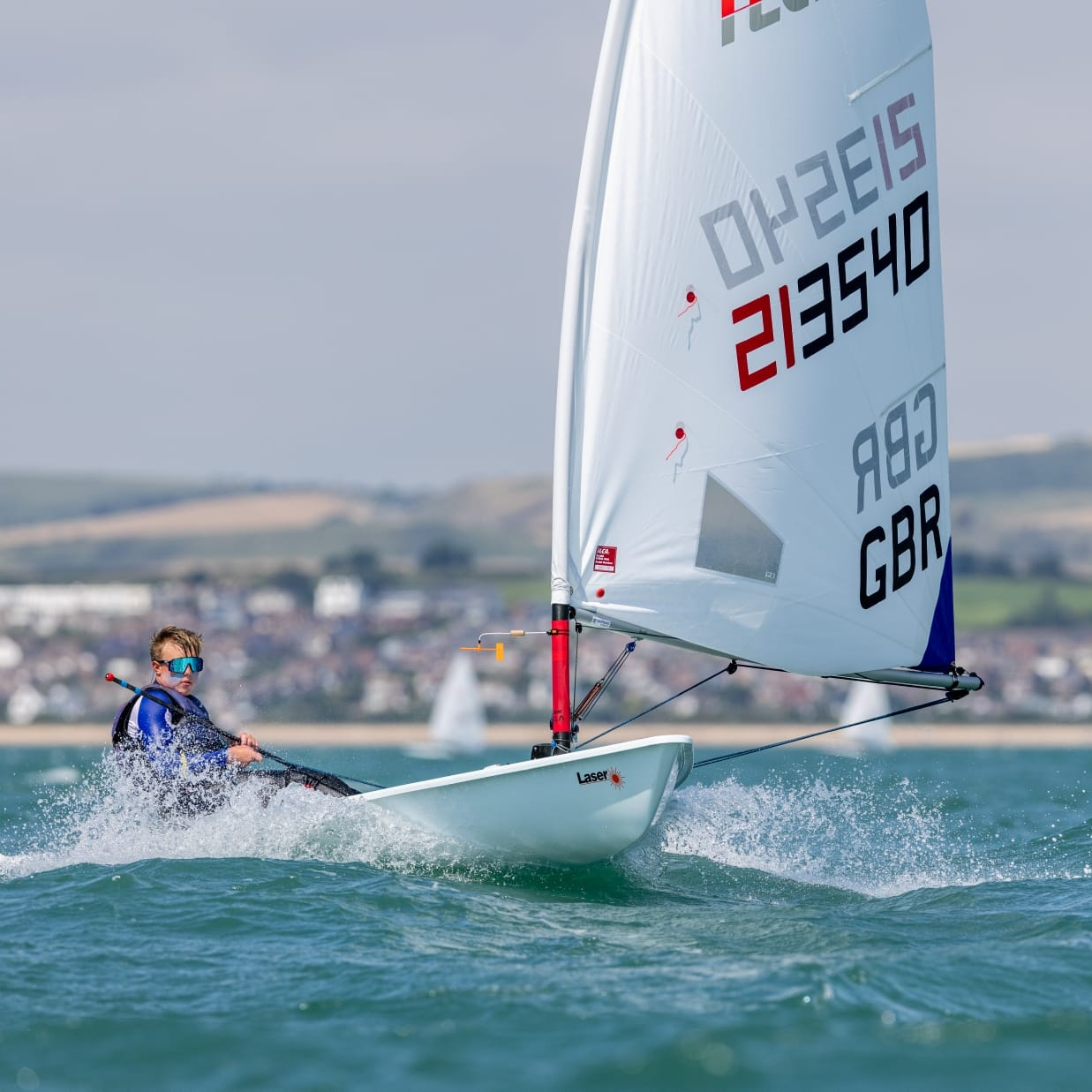
- GBR ILCA 6 dinghy racing in Waymouth Bay at the 2024 ILCA nationals

Development
- Design: One-Design
- Role: Olympic racing class

Boat
- Crew: 1
- Draft: 0.787 m (2 ft 7.0 in)

Hull
- Hull weight: 58.97 kg (130.0 lb)
- LOA: 4.2 m (13 ft 9 in)
- LWL: 3.81 m (12 ft 6 in)
- Beam: 1.39 m (4 ft 7 in)

Sails
- Mainsail area: 5.76 m^{2} (62.0 sq ft)

Rating
- D-PN: 96.7
- RYA PN: 1154

The Laser Radial or ILCA 6 is a popular one-design class of small sailing dinghy, originally built by Laser Performance and World sailing approved manufactures. It is a singlehanded boat, meaning that it is sailed by one person. The Laser Radial is a variant of the Laser Standard, with shorter mast and reduced sail area, allowing light sailors to sail in heavy winds. It raced by women, U18 men and by male masters. The International Class is recognised by World Sailing. The class is referred to as the "Radial" due to the Radial technique used to create the sail with the panels stemming from the clew (far bottom corner) and reaching up the sail to the luff (the front edge). The boat is also often called the ILCA 6 due to Laser sailboats losing the rights to manufacture it after selling them to the class association.

== Olympics ==
The Laser Radial was chosen for singlehanded women discipline at the Summer Olympic starting with the 2008 Olympic Games in Qingdao, China and is still being raced at the Olympics.

Games	Gold	Silver	Bronze
2008 Beijing	Anna Tunnicliffe; United States	Gintarė Volungevičiūtė; Lithuania	Xu Lijia; China
2012 London	Xu Lijia; China	Marit Bouwmeester; Netherlands	Evi Van Acker; Belgium
2016 Rio de Janeiro	Marit Bouwmeester; Netherlands	Annalise Murphy; Ireland	Anne-Marie Rindom; Denmark
2020 Tokyo	Anne-Marie Rindom; Denmark	Josefin Olsson; Sweden	Marit Bouwmeester; Netherlands
2024 Paris	Marit Bouwmeester; Netherlands	Anne-Marie Rindom; Denmark	Line Flem Høst; Norway
2028 Los Angeles			

== World championships ==
Class World Championships:

- Open Laser Radial World Championships No Longer Held
- Men's ILCA 6 World Championship
- Women's ILCA 6 World Championships
- Youth ILCA 6 World Championships
- ILCA Under 21 World Championships
- ILCA Masters World Championships

Other World Championships Using ILCA 6:

- Youth Sailing World Championships
- World Sailing Inclusion Championships

== See also ==
- Laser (dinghy)
- Laser 4.7
