= Sailing at the 2015 SEA Games =

- Venue: National Sailing Centre; Marina Bay (Keelboat)
- Dates: 6–14 June 2015
- Competitors: 123 from 7 nations

Sailing at the 2015 SEA Games took place at the National Sailing Centre in East Coast Park, Singapore and Marina Bay, Singapore between 6–14 June.

== Competition schedule ==
P	Preliminary races	½	Semifinal races	M	Medal race

Event↓/Date →	Sat 6	Sun 7		Mon 8	Tue 9		Wed 10	Thu 11	Fri 12		Sat 13	Sun 14
Men's RS:X	P	P			P		M					
Men's Laser	P	P		P	M							
Men's 470					P		P	P			M	
Men's Youth 420							P	P	P			M
Men's Optimist							P	P	P		M	
Men's Youth Laser Radial	P	P		P	P	M						
Men's Match Racing								P				M
Men's Fleet Racing	P	P		P	P	M						
Men's Team Racing Laser								P	½		M	M
Women's RS:X	P	P			P		M					
Women's 49erFX							P	P	P			M
Women's Laser Radial	P	P		P	P	M						
Women's 470					P		P	P			M	
Women's Youth 420							P	P	P			M
Women's Optimist							P	P	P		M	
Women's Youth Laser Radial	P	P		P	P	M						
Women's Match Racing									P	½	M	M
Women's Fleet Racing		P		P	P	M						
Women's Team Racing Laser Radial								P	P	½	M	M
Team Racing Optimist	P	P	M									

== Results ==
=== Medal summary ===
* Host nation (Singapore)

Rank	Nation	Gold	Silver	Bronze	Total
1	Singapore (SIN)*	10	7	1	18
2	Malaysia (MAS)	7	5	2	14
3	Thailand (THA)	2	6	8	16
4	Philippines (PHI)	1	2	0	3
5	Indonesia (INA)	0	0	3	3
Totals (5 entries)		20	20	14	54

=== Men ===
Event	Gold	Silver	Bronze
Laser Standard	Cheng Xinru Colin; Singapore	Khairulnizam Afendy; Malaysia	Keerati Bualong; Thailand
470	Singapore (SIN): Choy Wong Loong Darren; Yeo Jeremiah	Philippines (PHI): Lester Troy Tayong; Emerson Villena	Thailand (THA): Thanapong Kamonvat; Navee Thamsoontorn
Windsurfing RS:X	Natthaphong Phonoppharat; Thailand	Ong Leonard; Singapore	I Gusti Made Oka Sulaksana; Indonesia
Optimist (U16)	Muhammad Fauzi Bin Kaman Shah; Malaysia	Suthon Yampinid; Thailand	Toh Daniel Ian; Singapore
Match Racing Keelboat	Philippines (PHI): Ridgely Balladares; Rommel Chavez; Richly Arquino Magsanay	Singapore (SIN): Koh Kia Ler James; Koh Yi Nian; Lai Xuan Yi Jodie	Not awarded
Laser Radial (U19)	Chin Cheok Khoon Bernie; Singapore	Apiwat Sringam; Thailand	Zainuddin Ahmad; Indonesia
420 (U19)	Malaysia (MAS): Muhammad Uzair Amin Mohd Yusof; Naquib Eiman Shahrin	Singapore (SIN): Noor Azniza Binteh; Lim Jia Yi	Thailand (THA): Puvich Chanyim; Sarawut Phetsiri
Fleet Racing Keelboat	Singapore (SIN): Chan Hian Gee Stanley; Kiong Lye Ming Anthony; Ng Wee Tai Colin	Philippines (PHI): Ridgely Balladares; Rommel Chavez; Richly Arquino Magsanay	Thailand (THA): Wiwat Poonpat; Anun Daochanterk; Tossaphon Jonjaitrong
Team Racing Laser Standard	Malaysia (MAS): Ahmad Latif Khan Bin Ali Sabri Khan; Muhammad Farhan Bin Hamid; Khairulnizam Afendy	Singapore (SIN): Cheng Xinru Colin; Lo Jun Han Ryan; Scott Glen Sydney	Not awarded

=== Women ===
Event	Gold	Silver	Bronze
Laser Radial	Kamolwan Chanyim; Thailand	Chan Jing Hua Victoria; Singapore	Khairunneeta Mohd Afendy; Malaysia
470	Malaysia (MAS): Tan Jing Wei; Norashikin Binte Mohamad Sayed	Thailand (THA): Panida Suksomporn; Narisara Yu-Sawat	Not awarded
Windsurfing RS:X	Yong Pei Lin Audrey; Singapore	Siripon Kaewduang-Ngam; Thailand	Hoiriyah Hoiriyah; Indonesia
Skiff 49er FX	Singapore (SIN): Khng Griselda; Tan Li Ching Sara	Malaysia (MAS): Tan Hong Mui Rufina; Tsen Connie Riverra	Not awarded
Optimist (U16)	Lai Xuan Yi Jodie; Singapore	Kamonchanok Klahan; Thailand	Nor Nabila Natasha Binte Mohd Nazri; Malaysia
Match Racing Keelboat	Singapore (SIN): Choo Bei Fen Jovina; Lam Peiyi Terena; Liu Xiaodan Dawn; Ng Hui Min Daniella	Malaysia (MAS): Nurul Elia Binte Anuar; Geh Cheow Lin; Nur Amirah Binte Hamid; Umi Norwahida Binte Sallahuddin	Thailand (THA): Jongkol Channart; Sai Chimsawat; Benjamas Poonpat; Yupa Tananong
Laser Radial (U19)	Nur Shazrin Mohamad Latif; Malaysia	Kanapan Pachatikapanya; Thailand	Not awarded
420 (U19)	Singapore (SIN): Samantha Annabelle Neubronner; Elisa Yukie Yokoyama	Malaysia (MAS): Nor Adriana Adlyna Binte Mohd Nazri; Siti Nur Fatihah Binte Norulakhairi	Thailand (THA): Piriyaporn Kangkla; Chaninat Poolsirikot
Fleet Racing Keelboat	Singapore (SIN): Choo Bei Fen Jovina; Lam Peiyi Terena; Liu Xiaodan Dawn; Ng Hui Min Daniella	Malaysia (MAS): Nurul Elia Anuar; Geh Cheow Lin; Nur Amirah Hamid; Umi Norwahida Sallahuddin	Thailand (THA): Jongkol Channart; Sai Chimsawat; Benjamas Poonpat; Yupa Tananong
Team Racing Laser Radial	Malaysia (MAS): Nur Shazrin Binte Mohamad Latif; Nurliyana Binte Mohamad Latif; Khairunneeta Binte Mohd Afendy	Singapore (SIN): Chan Jing Hua Victoria; Goh Kai Ling Jessica; Yin Yueling Elizabeth	Not awarded

=== Mixed ===
Event	Gold	Silver	Bronze
Team Racing Optimist (U16)	Malaysia (MAS): Muhammad Fauzi Kaman Shah; Abdul Latif Mansur; Nor Nabila Natasha Mohd Nazri; Nur Aisah Rose Ramlee; Muhammad Dhiauddin Bin Rozain	Singapore (SIN): Koh Kia Ler James; Koh Yi Nian; Lai Xuan Yi Jodie; Muhammad Daniel Kei Bin Yazid; Toh Daniel Ian	Thailand (THA): Kamonchanok Klahan; Saranwong Poonpat; Voravong rachrattanaruk; Chanokchon Wangsuk; Suthon Yampinid
