= Sailing at the 2015 SEA Games – Men's Team Racing Laser Standard =

Sailing – Men's Team Racing Laser Standard at the 2015 SEA Games
- Venue: National Sailing Centre
- Dates: 11, 13 and 14 June 2015
- Competitors: 9 from 3 nations

Medalists
gold medal	Malaysia (MAS)
silver medal	Singapore (SIN)
bronze medal	Thailand (THA)

The Men's Team Racing Laser Standard is a sailing event on the Sailing at the SEA Games programme at the National Sailing Centre.

== Schedule ==
All times are Singapore Standard Time (UTC+08:00)

Date	Time	Event
Thursday 11 June 2015	11:30	Heats
Saturday 13 June 2015	14:25	Heats
Sunday, 14 June 2015	12:00	Final

== Results ==
=== Preliminary round ===
Rank	Team	W	L	Score
1	Singapore (SIN): Cheng Xinru Colin; Lo Jun Han Ryan; Scott Glen Sydney	4	0	4
2	Malaysia (MAS): Ahmad Latif Khan Bin Ali Sabri Khan; Muhammad Farhan Bin Hamid; Khairulnizam Afendy Bin Mohd Afendy	1	3	1
3rd place, bronze medalist(s)	Thailand (THA): Keerati Bualong; Natthawut Paenyaem; Pontep Sookudom	1	3	1

	MAS	SIN	THA
Malaysia (MAS)		0–2	1–1
Singapore (SIN)	2–0		2–0
Thailand (THA)	1–1	0–2	

=== Knockout round ===
Rank	Country	Score	Notes
1st place, gold medalist(s)	Malaysia (MAS)	1	
2nd place, silver medalist(s)	Singapore (SIN)	0	
