= Sailing at the 2015 SEA Games – Men's Laser =

Sailing – Men's Laser Standard at the 2015 SEA Games
- Venue: National Sailing Centre
- Dates: 6 to 9 June 2015
- Competitors: 4 from 4 nations

Medalists
gold medal	Cheng Xinru Colin	Singapore
silver medal	Khairulnizam Afendy	Malaysia
bronze medal	Keerati Bualong	Thailand

The Men's Laser Standard is a sailing event on the Sailing at the SEA Games programme at the National Sailing Centre.

== Schedule ==
All times are Singapore Standard Time (UTC+08:00)

Date	Time	Event
Saturday, 6 June 2015	10:30	Heats
Sunday, 7 June 2015	11:30	Heats
Monday, 8 June 2015	10:30	Heats
Tuesday, 9 June 2015	10:30	Final

== Results ==
Rank	Athlete	Points per Race									Medal race	Net points	Total score
Rank	Athlete	1	2	3	4	5	6	7	8	9	Medal race	Net points	Total score
1st place, gold medalist(s)	Cheng Xinru Colin (SIN)	~~2~~	1	1	1	1	1	1	1	2	2	11	13
2nd place, silver medalist(s)	Khairulnizam Afendy (MAS)	1	2	3	2	~~4~~	3	2	3	1	6	23	27
3rd place, bronze medalist(s)	Keerati Bualong (THA)	3	3	2	3	2	~~4~~	3	2	3	4	25	29
4	Rubin Cruz Junior (PHI)	~~4~~	4	4	4	3	2	4	4	4	8	37	41

Notes

If sailors are disqualified or do not complete the race, 7 points are assigned for that race with 6 boats, 6 points for race with 5 boats, and 5 points for race with 4 boats

Scoring abbreviations are defined as follows:

- OCS – On course side of the starting line
- DSQ – Disqualified
- DNF – Did Not Finish
- DNS – Did Not Start
