= Sailing at the 2018 Asian Games – Women's Laser Radial =

Women's Laser Radial at the 2018 Asian Games
- Venue: Ancol Beach Marina
- Date: 24–31 August 2018
- Competitors: 10 from 10 nations

Medalists
gold medal	Manami Doi	Japan
silver medal	Zhang Dongshuang	China
bronze medal	Nur Shazrin Mohd Latif	Malaysia

The women's Laser Radial competition at the 2018 Asian Games was held from 24 to 31 August 2018. It was also the qualification tournament for Laser Radial Class at the 2020 Summer Olympics.

== Schedule ==
All times are Western Indonesia Time (UTC+07:00)

Date	Time	Event
Friday, 24 August 2018	14:10	Race 1
Friday, 24 August 2018	14:55	Race 2
Saturday, 25 August 2018	12:10	Race 3
Saturday, 25 August 2018	12:50	Race 4
Saturday, 25 August 2018	13:35	Race 5
Sunday, 26 August 2018	12:18	Race 6
Sunday, 26 August 2018	13:32	Race 7
Tuesday, 28 August 2018	12:05	Race 8
Tuesday, 28 August 2018	12:50	Race 9
Wednesday, 29 August 2018	12:50	Race 10
Wednesday, 29 August 2018	13:58	Race 11
Friday, 31 August 2018	14:05	Race 12

== Results ==
Legend

- DNC — Did not come to the starting area
- DNE — Non-excludable disqualification
- DNF — Did not finish
- DSQ — Disqualification
- RET — Retired

Rank	Athlete	Race												Total
Rank	Athlete	1	2	3	4	5	6	7	8	9	10	11	12	Total
1st place, gold medalist(s)	Manami Doi (JPN)	1	2	1	1	1	2	1	1	1	1	1	~~(11)~~; DNC	13
2nd place, silver medalist(s)	Zhang Dongshuang (CHN)	~~(11)~~; DSQ	1	3	2	3	1	4	2	2	2	4	1	25
3rd place, bronze medalist(s)	Nur Shazrin Mohd Latif (MAS)	2	4	4	3	~~(5)~~	4	3	3	4	5	2	2	36
4	Kamolwan Chanyim (THA)	4	~~(5)~~	2	5	2	5	2	5	3	3	3	4	38
5	Nethra Kumanan (IND)	3	3	5	4	4	3	5	9	7	6	~~(11)~~; RET	5	54
6	Jillian Lee (SGP)	5	6	6	6	9	6	8	4	6	4	~~(11)~~; DNF	3	63
7	Kim Ji-a (KOR)	6	9	9	8	6	7	9	7	5	7	~~(11)~~; DSQ	6	79
8	Molly Highfield (HKG)	8	8	7	9	7	8	~~(10)~~	6	8	8	5	7	81
9	Kirana Wardojo (INA)	7	7	8	7	8	9	6	8	~~(11)~~; RET	11; DNE	6	8	85
10	Karina Jangazova (KAZ)	9	~~(10)~~	10	10	10	10	7	10	9	9	7	9	100
