= Sailing at the 2014 Asian Games – Women's Laser Radial =

Women's Laser Radial at the 2014 Asian Games
- Venue: Wangsan Marina
- Date: 24–30 September 2014
- Competitors: 8 from 8 nations

Medalists
gold medal	Zhang Dongshuang	China
silver medal	Manami Doi	Japan
bronze medal	Kamolwan Chanyim	Thailand

The women's Laser Radial competition at the 2014 Asian Games in Incheon was held from 24 to 30 September 2014.

== Schedule ==
All times are Korea Standard Time (UTC+09:00)

Date	Time	Event
Wednesday, 24 September 2014	12:00	Race 1
Wednesday, 24 September 2014	12:00	Race 2
Wednesday, 24 September 2014	12:00	Race 3
Thursday, 25 September 2014	11:00	Race 4
Friday, 26 September 2014	11:00	Race 5
Friday, 26 September 2014	11:00	Race 6
Friday, 26 September 2014	11:00	Race 7
Friday, 26 September 2014	11:00	Race 8
Saturday, 27 September 2014	11:00	Race 9
Saturday, 27 September 2014	11:00	Race 10
Tuesday, 30 September 2014	11:00	Race 11
Tuesday, 30 September 2014	11:00	Race 12

== Results ==
Legend

- DNE — Non-excludable disqualification
- OCS — On course side

Rank	Athlete	Race												Total
Rank	Athlete	1	2	3	4	5	6	7	8	9	10	11	12	Total
1st place, gold medalist(s)	Zhang Dongshuang (CHN)	2	2	1	1	~~(5)~~	2	2	1	1	3	1	1	17
2nd place, silver medalist(s)	Manami Doi (JPN)	1	1	2	~~(4)~~	1	1	4	2	3	1	3	3	22
3rd place, bronze medalist(s)	Kamolwan Chanyim (THA)	3	3	3	3	2	4	~~(5)~~	5	4	5	2	2	36
4	Elizabeth Yin (SIN)	6	4	5	2	~~(9)~~; OCS	9 OCS	7	4	2	2	5	5	51
5	Nur Amirah Hamid (MAS)	4	5	4	6	3	3	6	~~(8)~~	5	6	6	6	54
6	Lee Gyeong-jin (KOR)	7	6	7	5	~~(9)~~; OCS	9 OCS	1	3	6	4	4	4	56
7	Nethra Kumanan (IND)	5	7	6	9 DNE	4	5	~~(8)~~	6	7	7	7	7	70
8	Karina Jangazova (KAZ)	~~(8)~~	8	8	7	6	6	3	7	8	8	8	8	77
