= Sailing at the 2015 SEA Games – Men's keelboat fleet racing =

Sailing – Men's Fleet Racing Keelboat at the 2015 SEA Games
- Venue: National Sailing Centre
- Dates: 7 to 9 June 2015
- Competitors: 12 from 4 nations

Medalists
gold medal	Singapore (SIN)
silver medal	Philippines (PHI)
bronze medal	Thailand (THA)

The Men's Fleet Racing Keelboat is a sailing event on the Sailing at the SEA Games programme at the National Sailing Centre.

== Schedule ==
All times are Singapore Standard Time (UTC+08:00)

Date	Time	Event
Saturday, 6 June 2015	13:30	Heats
Sunday, 7 June 2015	18:05	Heats
Monday, 8 June 2015	10:30	Heats
Tuesday, 9 June 2015	10:50	Final

== Results ==
Rank	Athlete	Race									Medal race	Net points	Total score
Rank	Athlete	1	2	3	4	5	6	7	8	9	Medal race	Net points	Total score
1st place, gold medalist(s)	Singapore (SIN): Chan Hian Gee Stanley; Kiong Lye Ming Anthony; Ng Wee Tai Colin	2	1	1	1	2	2	2			2	13	13
2nd place, silver medalist(s)	Philippines (PHI): Ridgely Balladares; Rommel Chavez; Richly Arquino Magsanay	1	2	2	2	1	1	3			6	18	18
3rd place, bronze medalist(s)	Thailand (THA): Wiwat Poonpat; Anun Daochanterk; Tossaphon Jonjaitrong	3	3	3	3	3	3	1			4	23	23
4	Malaysia (MAS): Mohd Akiyuddin Bin Mat Zaki; Mohamad Faizal Norizan; Syed Ahmad Syahmi Syed Ahmad Hilmi	5 DNS	5 DNS	5 DNS	5 DNS	5 DNS	5 DNS	5 DNS			10	45	45

Notes

If sailors are disqualified or do not complete the race, 7 points are assigned for that race with 6 boats, 6 points for race with 5 boats, and 5 points for race with 4 boats

Scoring abbreviations are defined as follows:

- OCS – On course side of the starting line
- DSQ – Disqualified
- DNF – Did Not Finish
- DNS – Did Not Start
