= Sailing at the 2010 Asian Games – Men's Laser =

Men's Laser at the 2010 Asian Games
- Venue: Shanwei Water Sports Center
- Date: 14–20 November 2010
- Competitors: 7 from 7 nations

Medalists
gold medal	Ha Jee-min	South Korea
silver medal	Colin Cheng	Singapore
bronze medal	Chen Huichao	China

The men's Laser competition at the 2010 Asian Games in Shanwei was held from 14 to 20 November 2010.

== Schedule ==
All times are China Standard Time (UTC+08:00)

Date	Time	Event
Sunday, 14 November 2010	12:00	Race 1
Sunday, 14 November 2010	12:00	Race 2
Monday, 15 November 2010	12:00	Race 3
Monday, 15 November 2010	12:00	Race 4
Tuesday, 16 November 2010	12:00	Race 5
Tuesday, 16 November 2010	12:00	Race 6
Wednesday, 17 November 2010	12:00	Race 7
Wednesday, 17 November 2010	12:00	Race 8
Friday, 19 November 2010	12:00	Race 9
Friday, 19 November 2010	12:00	Race 10
Saturday, 20 November 2010	12:00	Race 11
Saturday, 20 November 2010	12:00	Race 12

== Results ==
Legend

- DNF — Did not finish
- DSQ — Disqualification
- OCS — On course side

Rank	Athlete	Race												Total
Rank	Athlete	1	2	3	4	5	6	7	8	9	10	11	12	Total
1st place, gold medalist(s)	Ha Jee-min (KOR)	2	1	2	2	2	2	2	1	~~(5)~~	3	3	1	21
2nd place, silver medalist(s)	Colin Cheng (SIN)	1	2	1	1	3	3	3	2	6	~~(8)~~; OCS	2	2	26
3rd place, bronze medalist(s)	Chen Huichao (CHN)	3	4	3	3	4	1	1	4	1	2	1	~~(8)~~; DSQ	27
4	Khairulnizam Afendy (MAS)	~~(5)~~	3	5	4	1	4	4	5	2	4	4	3	39
5	Sami Kooheji (BRN)	~~(6)~~	5	4	5	6	5	5	3	3	6	5	4	51
6	Ilia Ignatev (KGZ)	4	6	~~(7)~~	7	5	7	7	7	4	1	7	6	61
7	Muhammad Yousaf (PAK)	7	~~(8)~~; DNF	6	6	7	6	6	6	7	5	6	5	67
