= Sailing at the 2026 Asian Games – Women's ILCA 6 =

Women's ILCA 6 at the 2026 Asian Games
- Venue: Kaiyoh Yacht Harbor
- Date: 28 September – 2 October 2026
- Competitors: 13 from 13 nations

Medalists
gold medal	Sophia Montgomery	Thailand
silver medal	Jania Ang	Singapore
bronze medal	Nethra Kumanan	India

The women's ILCA 6 competition at the 2026 Asian Games was held from 28 September – 2 October 2026 at Kaiyoh Yacht Harbor in Gamagōri, Aichi, Japan.

The competition consisted of a nine-race qualification series followed by a two-race final for the top ten sailors.

Sophia Montgomery won the gold medal, Jania Ang took silver and Nethra Kumanan bronze.

== Schedule ==
All times are Japan Standard Time (UTC+09:00).

Date	Time	Event
Monday, 28 September 2026	11:10	Race 1–2
Wednesday, 30 September 2026	11:10	Race 3–5
Thursday, 1 October 2026	10:10	Race 6–9
Friday, 2 October 2026	12:15	Final

== Results ==
Legend

- DSQ — Disqualification
- DNF — Did not finish
- RET — Retired
- STP — Standard penalty
- UFD — U flag disqualification

Rank	Athlete	Qualification series									Rec.	Final		Total	Net
Rank	Athlete	1	2	3	4	5	6	7	8	9	Rec.	F1	F2	Total	Net
1st place, gold medalist(s)	Sophia Montgomery (THA)	2	2	2	~~(6)~~	5	1	3	4	2	0	2	3	5	5
2nd place, silver medalist(s)	Jania Ang (SGP)	1	7	1	3	7	4	5	1	~~(9)~~	8	3	2	13	13
3rd place, bronze medalist(s)	Nethra Kumanan (IND)	~~(5)~~	3	4	5	2	5	2	3	4	7	6	1	14	14
4	Stephanie Louise Norton (HKG)	3	1	8	1	~~(10)~~	3	1	5	7	8	1	5	14	14
5	Yumiko Tombe (JPN)	4	5	5	2	4	~~(8)~~	4	8	1	12	4	7	23	23
6	Gao Junqi (CHN)	6	6	~~(7)~~	7	6	7	6	2	6	22	5	4	31	31
7	Nur Shazrin Mohamad Latif (MAS)	~~(9)~~	4	3	9	9	2	7	6	5	21	8	6	35	35
8	Jung Hye-won (KOR)	8	~~(9)~~	6	4	1	6	8	7	8	24	7	8	39	39
9	Ameena Shah (KUW)	~~(10)~~	8	10	8	8	9	9	9	3	26	9	10	45	45
10	Dhuha Albeshr (UAE)	7	10	9	10	3	11	~~(12)~~	11	10	26	11; STP	9	46	46
11	Yana Belozerova (KAZ)	12	12	12	12	~~(13)~~	10	10	10	11				102	89
12	Arianna Taalya Tranchell (SRI)	11	11	~~(13)~~	13	11	12	11	13	12				107	94
13	Nguyễn Thị Nhung (VIE)	~~(13)~~	13	11	11	12	13	13	12	13				111	98
