= Sailing at the 2015 SEA Games – Women's keelboat fleet racing =

Sailing – Women's Fleet Racing Keelboat at the 2015 SEA Games
- Venue: National Sailing Centre
- Dates: 7 to 9 June 2015
- Competitors: 16 from 4 nations

Medalists
gold medal	Singapore (SIN)
silver medal	Malaysia (MAS)
bronze medal	Thailand (THA)

The Women's Fleet Racing Keelboat is a sailing event on the Sailing at the SEA Games programme at the National Sailing Centre.

== Schedule ==
All times are Singapore Standard Time (UTC+08:00)

Date	Time	Event
Sunday, 7 June 2015	17:25	Heats
Monday, 8 June 2015	15:30	Heats
Tuesday, 9 June 2015	10:00	Final

== Results ==
Rank	Athlete	Race									Medal race	Net points	Total score
Rank	Athlete	1	2	3	4	5	6	7	8	9	Medal race	Net points	Total score
1st place, gold medalist(s)	Singapore (SIN): Choo Bei Fen Jovina; Lam Peiyi Terena; Liu Xiaodan Dawn; Ng Hui Min Daniella	1	1	1	1	1	1	1			2	9	9
2nd place, silver medalist(s)	Malaysia (MAS): Nurul Elia Anuar; Geh Cheow Lin; Nur Amirah Hamid; Umi Norwahida Sallahuddin	2	2	2	2	2	2	2			4	18	18
3rd place, bronze medalist(s)	Thailand (THA): Jongkol Channart; Sai Chimsawat; Benjamas Poonpat; Yupa Tananong	3	4	3	4	4	5 DSQ	3			6	31	31
4	Philippines (PHI): Rye Lee Caasi; Jerene Medel Durana; Cyrin Ann Guingona; Rheycilla Morido Manaog	4	3	4	3	3	3	4			8	33	33

Notes

If sailors are disqualified or do not complete the race, 7 points are assigned for that race with 6 boats, 6 points for race with 5 boats, and 5 points for race with 4 boats

Scoring abbreviations are defined as follows:

- OCS – On course side of the starting line
- DSQ – Disqualified
- DNF – did not finish
- DNS – did not start
