= Sailing at the 2015 SEA Games – Boys' Laser Radial =

Sailing – Men's Laser Radial at the 2015 SEA Games
- Venue: National Sailing Centre
- Dates: 6 to 9 June 2015
- Competitors: 4 from 4 nations

Medalists
gold medal	Chin Cheok Khoon Bernie	Singapore
silver medal	Apiwat Sringam	Thailand
bronze medal	Zainuddin Ahmad	Indonesia

The Men's Youth Laser Radial (U19) is a sailing event on the Sailing at the SEA Games programme at the National Sailing Centre.

== Schedule ==
All times are Singapore Standard Time (UTC+08:00)

Date	Time	Event
Saturday, 6 June 2015	13:30	Heats
Sunday, 7 June 2015	11:50	Heats
Monday, 8 June 2015	10:50	Heats
Tuesday, 9 June 2015	10:50	Final

== Results ==
Rank	Athlete	Race									Medal race	Net points	Total score
Rank	Athlete	1	2	3	4	5	6	7	8	9	Medal race	Net points	Total score
1st place, gold medalist(s)	Chin Cheok Khoon Bernie (SIN)	2	1	3	1	1	1	~~4~~	1	1	2	13	17
2nd place, silver medalist(s)	Apiwat Sringam (THA)	3	~~4~~	1	2	2	2	1	2	3	6	22	26
3rd place, bronze medalist(s)	Zainuddin Ahmad (INA)	1	2	2	~~4~~	4	4	2	4	2	8	29	33
4	Asri Azman (MAS)	~~4~~	3	4	3	3	3	3	3	4	4	30	34
5	Lim Jenn Kiat (BRU)	5	5	5	5	5	~~6~~; ~~DNF~~	6 DNS	5	5	12	53	59

Notes

If sailors are disqualified or do not complete the race, 7 points are assigned for that race with 6 boats, 6 points for race with 5 boats, and 5 points for race with 4 boats

Scoring abbreviations are defined as follows:

- OCS – On course side of the starting line
- DSQ – Disqualified
- DNF – Did Not Finish
- DNS – Did Not Start
