= Sailing at the 2015 SEA Games – Girls' Laser Radial =

Sailing – Women's Youth Laser Radial at the 2015 SEA Games
- Venue: National Sailing Centre
- Dates: 6 to 9 June 2015
- Competitors: 3 from 3 nations

Medalists
gold medal	Nur Shazrin Mohamad Latif	Malaysia
silver medal	Kanapan Pachatikapanya	Thailand
bronze medal	Yom Jingyi Samantha	Singapore

The Women's Youth Laser Radial (U19) is a sailing event on the Sailing at the SEA Games programme at the National Sailing Centre.

== Schedule ==
All times are Singapore Standard Time (UTC+08:00)

Date	Time	Event
Saturday, 6 June 2015	15:00	Heats
Sunday, 7 June 2015	12:00	Heats
Monday, 8 June 2015	11:00	Heats
Tuesday, 9 June 2015	10:40	Final

== Results ==
Rank	Athlete	Race									Medal race	Net points	Total score
Rank	Athlete	1	2	3	4	5	6	7	8	9	Medal race	Net points	Total score
1st place, gold medalist(s)	Nur Shazrin Mohamad Latif (MAS)	1	2	2	1	~~3~~	2	1	1	1	2	13	16
2nd place, silver medalist(s)	Kanapan Pachatikapanya (THA)	~~3~~	1	3	2	1	3	2	2	2	4	20	23
3rd place, bronze medalist(s)	Yom Jingyi Samantha (SIN)	2	~~3~~	1	3	2	1	3	3	3	6	24	27

Notes

If sailors are disqualified or do not complete the race, 7 points are assigned for that race with 6 boats, 6 points for race with 5 boats, and 5 points for race with 4 boats

Scoring abbreviations are defined as follows:

- OCS – On course side of the starting line
- DSQ – Disqualified
- DNF – Did Not Finish
- DNS – Did Not Start
