= Sailing at the 2015 SEA Games – Women's 470 =

Sailing – Women's 470 at the 2015 SEA Games
- Venue: National Sailing Centre
- Dates: 9 to 11, 13 June 2015
- Competitors: 6 from 3 nations

Medalists
gold medal	Malaysia (MAS)
silver medal	Thailand (THA)
bronze medal	Singapore (SIN)

The Women's 470 is a sailing event on the Sailing at the SEA Games programme at the National Sailing Centre, in the 470 dinghy.

== Schedule ==
All times are Singapore Standard Time (UTC+08:00)

Date	Time	Event
Tuesday, 9 June 2015	10:30	Heats
Wednesday, 10 June 2015	10:40	Heats
Thursday, 11 June 2015	13:00	Heats
Saturday, 13 June 2015	11:00	Final

== Results ==
Rank	Athlete	Points per Race									Medal race	Net points	Total score
Rank	Athlete	1	2	3	4	5	6	7	8	9	Medal race	Net points	Total score
1st place, gold medalist(s)	Malaysia (MAS): Nur Aisyah Binte Jamil; Norashikin Binte Mohamad Sayed	2	~~3~~	1	1	2	1	1	2	1	2	13	16
2nd place, silver medalist(s)	Thailand (THA): Panida Suksomporn; Narisara Yu-Sawat	1	1	2	2	~~3~~	2	2	1	3	4	18	121
3rd place, bronze medalist(s)	Singapore (SIN): Siew Kiah Hui Savannah; Ng Ling Kai Amanda	~~3~~	2	3	3	1	3	3	3	2	6	26	29

Notes

If sailors are disqualified or do not complete the race, 7 points are assigned for that race with 6 boats, 6 points for race with 5 boats, and 5 points for race with 4 boats

Scoring abbreviations are defined as follows:

- OCS – On course side of the starting line
- DSQ – Disqualified
- DNF – Did Not Finish
- DNS – Did Not Start
