= Sailing at the 2015 SEA Games – Men's match racing =

Sailing – Men's Match Racing Keelboat at the 2015 SEA Games
- Venue: National Sailing Centre
- Dates: 11 and 14 June 2015
- Competitors: 9 from 3 nations

Medalists
gold medal	Philippines (PHI)
silver medal	Singapore (SIN)
bronze medal	Thailand (THA)

The Men's Match Racing Keelboat is a sailing event on the Sailing at the SEA Games programme at the National Sailing Centre.

== Schedule ==
All times are Singapore Standard Time (UTC+08:00)

Date	Time	Event
Thursday 11 June 2015	12:30	Heats
Sunday, 14 June 2015	10:30	Final

== Results ==
=== Preliminary round ===
Rank	Team	W	L	Score
1	Singapore (SIN): Koh Kia Ler James; Koh Yi Nian; Lai Xuan Yi Jodie	2	0	2
2	Philippines (PHI): Ridgely Balladares; Rommel Chavez; Richly Arquino Magsanay	1	1	1
3rd place, bronze medalist(s)	Thailand (THA): Anun Daochanterk; Tossaphon Jonjaitrong; Wiwat Poonpat	0	2	0

	PHI	SIN	THA
Philippines (PHI)		0–1	1–0
Singapore (SIN)	1–0		1–0
Thailand (THA)	0–1	0–1	

=== Knockout round ===
Rank	Country	Score	Notes
1st place, gold medalist(s)	Philippines (PHI)	1	
2nd place, silver medalist(s)	Singapore (SIN)	0	
