= Sailing at the 2015 SEA Games – Women's Team Racing Laser Radial =

Sailing – Women's Team Racing Laser Radial at the 2015 SEA Games
- Venue: National Sailing Centre
- Dates: 11 to 14 June 2015
- Competitors: 9 from 3 nations

Medalists
gold medal	Malaysia (MAS)
silver medal	Singapore (SIN)
bronze medal	Thailand (THA)

The Women's Team Racing Laser Radial is a sailing event on the Sailing at the SEA Games programme at the National Sailing Centre.

== Schedule ==
All times are Singapore Standard Time (UTC+08:00)

Date	Time	Event
Thursday 11 June 2015	13:30	Heats
Friday 12 June 2015	11:30	Heats
Saturday 13 June 2015	11:30	Heats
Sunday, 14 June 2015	15:00	Final

== Results ==
=== Preliminary round ===
Rank	Team	W	L	Score
1	Malaysia (MAS): Nur Shazrin Binte Mohamad Latif; Nurliyana Binte Mohamad Latif; Khairunneeta Binte Mohd Afendy	3	1	3
1	Singapore (SIN): Chan Jing Hua Victoria; Goh Kai Ling Jessica; Yin Yueling Elizabeth	3	1	3
3rd place, bronze medalist(s)	Thailand (THA): Kamolwan Chanyim; Vanicha Chomtongdee; Nichaporn Panmuean	0	4	0

	MAS	SIN	THA
Malaysia (MAS)		1–1	2–0
Singapore (SIN)	1–1		2–0
Thailand (THA)	0–2	0–2	

=== Knockout round ===
Rank	Country	Score	Notes
1st place, gold medalist(s)	Malaysia (MAS)	1	
2nd place, silver medalist(s)	Singapore (SIN)	0	
