= Sailing at the 2015 SEA Games – Boys' 420 =

Sailing – Boys' 420 at the 2015 SEA Games
- Venue: National Sailing Centre
- Dates: 10 to 14 June 2015
- Competitors: 8 from 4 nations

Medalists
gold medal	Malaysia (MAS)
silver medal	Singapore (SIN)
bronze medal	Thailand (THA)

The boys' 420 (U19) is a sailing event on the Sailing at the SEA Games programme at the National Sailing Centre.

== Schedule ==
All times are Singapore Standard Time (UTC+08:00)

Date	Time	Event
Wednesday, 10 June 2015	10:50	Heats
Thursday, 11 June 2015	12:30	Heats
Friday, 12 June 2015	10:30	Heats
Saturday, 13 June 2015	10:40	Heats
Sunday, 14 June 2015	11:00	Final

== Results ==
Rank	Athlete	Points per Race									Medal race	Net points	Total score
Rank	Athlete	1	2	3	4	5	6	7	8	9	Medal race	Net points	Total score
1st place, gold medalist(s)	Malaysia (MAS): Muhammad Uzair Amin Mohd Yusof; Naquib Eiman Shahrin	1	1	1	1	~~2~~; ~~DPI~~	2	2	1	1	2	12	14
2nd place, silver medalist(s)	Singapore (SIN): Lau Wenjiang Matthew Scott; Loh Jia Yi	3	3	~~4~~	2	2	3	1	3	2	6	25	29
3rd place, bronze medalist(s)	Thailand (THA): Puvich Chanyim; Sarawut Phetsiri	2	2	2	3	3	1	4	4	~~5~~; ~~DNE~~	4	25	30
4	Myanmar (MYA): Htoo Chit Ye Ye; Htoo Saw Thaw Thi	4	4	3	4	~~5~~; ~~DPI~~	4	3	2	5 DNE	8	37	42

Notes

If sailors are disqualified or do not complete the race, 7 points are assigned for that race with 6 boats, 6 points for race with 5 boats, and 5 points for race with 4 boats

Scoring abbreviations are defined as follows:

- OCS – On course side of the starting line
- DSQ – Disqualified
- DNF – Did Not Finish
- DNS – Did Not Start
- DPI – Discretionary Penalty Imposed
