= Sailing at the 2015 SEA Games – Women's RS:X =

Windsurfing event at the SEA games

Sailing – Women's Windsurfing RS:X at the 2015 SEA Games
- Venue: National Sailing Centre
- Dates: 6, 7, 9 and 10 June 2015
- Competitors: 5 from 5 nations

Medalists
gold medal	Yong Pei Lin Audrey	Singapore
silver medal	Siripon Kaewduang-Ngam	Thailand
bronze medal	Hoiriyah Hoiriyah	Indonesia

The Women's Windsurfing RS:X is a sailing event on the Sailing at the SEA Games programme at the National Sailing Centre.

== Schedule ==
All times are Singapore Standard Time (UTC+08:00)

Date	Time	Event
Saturday, 6 June 2015	12:00	Heats
Sunday, 7 June 2015	11:50	Heats
Tuesday, 9 June 2015	12:00	Heats
Wednesday, 10 June 2015	11:00	Final

== Results ==
Rank	Athlete	Race									Medal race	Net points	Total score
Rank	Athlete	1	2	3	4	5	6	7	8	9	Medal race	Net points	Total score
1st place, gold medalist(s)	Yong Pei Lin Audrey (SIN)	1	1	1	1	1	~~2~~	2	2	2	2	13	15
2nd place, silver medalist(s)	Siripon Kaewduang-Ngam (THA)	2	2	2	~~4~~	2	1	1	1	1	4	16	20
3rd place, bronze medalist(s)	Hoiriyah Hoiriyah (INA)	3	3	~~4~~	3	4	3	3	4	4	6	33	37
4	July Hmwe (MYA)	~~4~~	4	3	2	3	4	4	3	3	8	34	38
5	Ong Xin Yean Katherine (MAS)	~~6~~; ~~DNS~~	6 DNS	6 DNS	6 DNS	6 DNS	6 DNS	6 DNS	6 DNS	6 DNS	12	60	66

Notes

If sailors are disqualified or do not complete the race, 7 points are assigned for that race with 6 boats, 6 points for race with 5 boats, and 5 points for race with 4 boats

Scoring abbreviations are defined as follows:

- OCS – On course side of the starting line
- DSQ – Disqualified
- DNF – Did Not Finish
- DNS – Did Not Start
