= Sailing at the 2015 SEA Games – Men's RS:X =

2015 Sailing Competition

Sailing – Men's Windsurfing RS:X at the 2015 SEA Games
- Venue: National Sailing Centre
- Dates: 6, 7 and 9 June 2015
- Competitors: 5 from 5 nations

Medalists
gold medal	Natthaphong Phonoppharat	Thailand
silver medal	Leonard Ong	Singapore
bronze medal	I Gusti Made Oka Sulaksana	Indonesia

The Men's Windsurfing RS:X is a sailing event on the Sailing at the SEA Games programme at the National Sailing Centre.

== Schedule ==
All times are Singapore Standard Time (UTC+08:00)

Date	Time	Event
Saturday, 6 June 2015	10:30	Heats
Sunday, 7 June 2015	11:40	Heats
Tuesday, 9 June 2015	12:10	Final

== Results ==
Rank	Athlete	Race									Medal race	Net points	Total score
Rank	Athlete	1	2	3	4	5	6	7	8	9	Medal race	Net points	Total score
1st place, gold medalist(s)	Natthaphong Phonoppharat (THA)	1	1	1	~~2~~	1	1	1	1	1	8	16	18
2nd place, silver medalist(s)	Ong Leonard (SIN)	2	~~4~~	3	1	2	4	4	3	2	2	23	27
3rd place, bronze medalist(s)	I Gusti Made Oka Sulaksana (INA)	3	2	2	~~5~~	3	2	2	4	3	4	25	30
4	Yancy Kaibigan (PHI)	4	3	~~5~~	3	5	3	3	2	4	6	33	38
5	Ahmad Danish Abdul Hadi Kame (MAS)	~~5~~	5	4	4	4	5	5	5	5	10	47	52

Notes

If sailors are disqualified or do not complete the race, 7 points are assigned for that race with 6 boats, 6 points for race with 5 boats, and 5 points for race with 4 boats

Scoring abbreviations are defined as follows:

- OCS – On course side of the starting line
- DSQ – Disqualified
- DNF – did not finish
- DNS – did not start
