= Sailing at the 2015 SEA Games – Girls' 420 =

Sailing – Girls' 420 at the 2015 SEA Games
- Venue: National Sailing Centre
- Dates: 10 to 14 June 2015
- Competitors: 8 from 4 nations

Medalists
| gold medal | Singapore (SIN) |
| silver medal | Malaysia (MAS) |
| bronze medal | Thailand (THA) |

The Girls' 420 (U19) is a sailing event on the Sailing at the SEA Games programme at the National Sailing Centre.

== Schedule ==
All times are Singapore Standard Time (UTC+08:00)

| Date | Time | Event |
|---|---|---|
| Wednesday, 10 June 2015 | 11:00 | Heats |
| Thursday, 11 June 2015 | 14:00 | Heats |
| Friday, 12 June 2015 | 12:00 | Heats |
| Saturday, 13 June 2015 | 10:30 | Heats |
| Sunday, 14 June 2015 | 11:30 | Final |

== Results ==
| Rank | Athlete | Points per Race | | | | | | | | | Medal race | Net points | Total score |
| Rank | Athlete | 1 | 2 | 3 | 4 | 5 | 6 | 7 | 8 | 9 | Medal race | Net points | Total score |
|---|---|---|---|---|---|---|---|---|---|---|---|---|---|
| 1st place, gold medalist(s) | Singapore (SIN): Samantha Annabelle Neubronner; Elisa Yukie Yokoyama | 1 | 2 | 2 | ~~3~~ | 1 | 1 | 2 | 1 | 2 | 4 | 16 | 19 |
| 2nd place, silver medalist(s) | Malaysia (MAS): Nor Adriana Adlyna Binte Mohd Nazri; Siti Nur Fatihah Binte Norulakhairi | 2 | 3 | 1 | 2 | ~~5~~; ~~DSQ~~ | 2 | 3 | 2 | 1 | 2 | 18 | 23 |
| 3rd place, bronze medalist(s) | Thailand (THA): Piriyaporn Kangkla; Chaninat Poolsirikot | ~~3~~ | 1 | 3 | 1 | 2 | 3 | 1 | 3 | 3 | 6 | 23 | 26 |
| 4 | Myanmar (MYA): Kyaw May Thazin; Maung Yoon Nadi | ~~4~~ | 4 | 4 | 4 | 3 | 4 | 4 | 4 | 4 | 8 | 39 | 43 |

Notes

If sailors are disqualified or do not complete the race, 7 points are assigned for that race with 6 boats, 6 points for race with 5 boats, and 5 points for race with 4 boats

Scoring abbreviations are defined as follows:

- OCS – On course side of the starting line
- DSQ – Disqualified
- DNF – Did Not Finish
- DNS – Did Not Start
