= Sailing at the 2017 SEA Games =

- Venue: National Sailing Centre
- Location: Langkawi, Malaysia
- Date: 21–29 August 2017

The sailing competitions at the 2017 SEA Games took place at the National Sailing Centre in Langkawi.

== Medal table ==
* Host nation (Malaysia)

Rank	Nation	Gold	Silver	Bronze	Total
1	Malaysia*	6	4	4	14
2	Thailand	4	6	4	14
3	Singapore	4	3	5	12
4	Philippines	0	1	1	2
Totals (4 entries)		14	14	14	42

== Medalists ==
=== Men ===
Event	Gold	Silver	Bronze
Windsurfing RS One	Natthaphong Phonoppharat; Thailand	Geylord Coveta; Philippines	Illham Wahab; Malaysia
Laser Standard	Ryan Lo; Singapore	Keerati Bualong; Thailand	Khairulnizam Afendy; Malaysia
Laser Radial	Ahmad Latif Khan; Malaysia	Bernie Chin Cheok Khoon; Singapore	Apiwat Sringam; Thailand
Optimist (U16)	Muhammad Fauzi Kaman Shah; Malaysia	Panwa Boonnak; Thailand	Max Victor Teo Li Chen; Singapore
International 420 (U19)	Malaysia; Muhamad Uzair Amin Yusof; Naquib Eiman Shahrin	Thailand; Suthon Yampinid; Nopporn Booncherd	Singapore; Koh Yi Nian; Wong Riji
International 470	Malaysia; Mohamad Faizal Norizan; Ahmad Syukri Abdul Aziz	Thailand; Navee Thamsoontorn; Nut Butmarasri	Philippines; Emersono Villena; Lester Troy Tayong
Team Racing Laser Standard	Singapore; Bernie Chin Cheok Khoon; Ryan Lo Jun Han; Mark Wong Vinn Howe	Malaysia; Asri Azman; Khairulnizam Afendy; Muhammad Farhan Hamid	Thailand; Chusitt Punjamala; Jarupong Meeyusamsen; Keerati Bualong

=== Women ===
Event	Gold	Silver	Bronze
Windsurfing RS One	Siripon Kaewduang-ngam; Thailand	Geh Cheow Lin; Malaysia	Nicole Lim Si Ning; Singapore
Laser Radial	Jillian Lee Sook Ying; Singapore	Nur Shazrin Mohamad Latif; Malaysia	Kanapan Pachatikapanya; Thailand
Optimist (U16)	Nurul Shazwanie Saad; Malaysia	Palika Poonpat; Thailand	Koh Radiance; Singapore
International 420 (U19)	Thailand; Sutida Poonpat; Gunyaporn Bueangbon	Singapore; Jodie Lai Xuan Yi; Evangeline Tan	Malaysia; Nur Aishah Kovo Yusri; Nurul Izzryn Shamsul Ariffin
International 470	Singapore; Elisa Yukie Yokoyama; Cheryl Teo	Malaysia; Nuraisyah Jamil; Norashikin Mohamad Sayed	Thailand; Narisara Satta; Nichapa Waiwai
Team Racing Laser Radial	Thailand; Kamonchanok Klahan; Kanapan Pachatikapanya; Vanicha Chomtongdee	Singapore; Simone Chen Wenqi; Jessica Goh Kai Ling; Jillian Lee Sook Ying	Malaysia; Khairunneeta Afendy; Nur Shazrin Mohamad Latif; Nurliyana Mohamad Latif

=== Mixed ===
Event	Gold	Silver	Bronze
Team Racing Optimist (U16)	Malaysia; Israr Hazim Ismail; Muhammad Fauzi Kaman Shah; Muhammad Syafie Ali; Nor Nabila Natasha Nazri; Nurul Shazwanie Saad	Thailand; Intira Panpiboon; Jedtavee Yongyuennarn; Palika Poonpat; Panwa Boonnak; Saranwong Poonpat	Singapore; Finian Lee Tze Yang; Koh Radiance; Max Victor Teo Li Chen; Muhammad Daniel Kei Yazid; Ron Koh Jieran
