= Sailing at the 2015 SEA Games – Women's Laser Radial =

Sailing – Women's Laser Radial at the 2015 SEA Games
- Venue: National Sailing Centre
- Dates: 6 to 9 June 2015
- Competitors: 4 from 4 nations

Medalists
| gold medal | Kamolwan Chanyim | Thailand |
| silver medal | Chan Jing Hua Victoria | Singapore |
| bronze medal | Khairunneeta Mohd Afendy | Malaysia |

The Women's Laser Radial is a sailing event on the Sailing at the SEA Games programme at the National Sailing Centre.

== Schedule ==
All times are Singapore Standard Time (UTC+08:00)

| Date | Time | Event |
|---|---|---|
| Saturday, 6 June 2015 | 12:00 | Heats |
| Sunday, 7 June 2015 | 11:40 | Heats |
| Monday, 8 June 2015 | 10:40 | Heats |
| Tuesday, 9 June 2015 | 10:30 | Final |

== Results ==
| Rank | Athlete | Race | | | | | | | | | Medal race | Net points | Total score |
| Rank | Athlete | 1 | 2 | 3 | 4 | 5 | 6 | 7 | 8 | 9 | Medal race | Net points | Total score |
|---|---|---|---|---|---|---|---|---|---|---|---|---|---|
| 1st place, gold medalist(s) | Kamolwan Chanyim (THA) | ~~1~~ | 1 | 1 | 1 | 1 | 1 | 1 | 1 | 1 | 6 | 14 | 15 |
| 2nd place, silver medalist(s) | Chan Jing Hua Victoria (SIN) | 2 | 2 | ~~3~~ | 3 | 3 | 2 | 2 | 2 | 3 | 2 | 12 | 24 |
| 3rd place, bronze medalist(s) | Khairunneeta Mohd Afendy (MAS) | 3 | 3 | 2 | 2 | ~~4~~ | 3 | 3 | 3 | 4 | 4 | 27 | 31 |
| 4 | Alaiza Mae Belmonte (PHI) | ~~4~~ | 4 | 4 | 4 | 2 | 4 | 4 | 4 | 2 | 8 | 36 | 40 |

Notes

If sailors are disqualified or do not complete the race, 7 points are assigned for that race with 6 boats, 6 points for race with 5 boats, and 5 points for race with 4 boats

Scoring abbreviations are defined as follows:

- OCS – On course side of the starting line
- DSQ – Disqualified
- DNF – Did Not Finish
- DNS – Did Not Start
