= Sailing at the 2014 Asian Games – Men's Laser =

Men's Laser at the 2014 Asian Games
- Venue: Wangsan Marina
- Date: 24–30 September 2014
- Competitors: 12 from 12 nations

Medalists
gold medal	Ha Jee-min	South Korea
silver medal	Khairulnizam Afendy	Malaysia
bronze medal	Colin Cheng	Singapore

The men's Laser competition at the 2014 Asian Games in Incheon was held from 24 to 30 September 2014.

== Schedule ==
All times are Korea Standard Time (UTC+09:00)

Date	Time	Event
Wednesday, 24 September 2014	12:00	Race 1
Wednesday, 24 September 2014	12:00	Race 2
Wednesday, 24 September 2014	12:00	Race 3
Thursday, 25 September 2014	11:00	Race 4
Thursday, 25 September 2014	11:00	Race 5
Friday, 26 September 2014	11:00	Race 6
Friday, 26 September 2014	11:00	Race 7
Friday, 26 September 2014	11:00	Race 8
Saturday, 27 September 2014	11:00	Race 9
Saturday, 27 September 2014	11:00	Race 10
Tuesday, 30 September 2014	11:00	Race 11
Tuesday, 30 September 2014	11:00	Race 12

== Results ==
Legend

- DNC — Did not come to the starting area
- DSQ — Disqualification
- OCS — On course side
- RAF — Retired after finishing

Rank	Athlete	Race												Total
Rank	Athlete	1	2	3	4	5	6	7	8	9	10	11	12	Total
1st place, gold medalist(s)	Ha Jee-min (KOR)	2	3	1	1	1	2	1	~~(13)~~; DSQ	1	1	3	1	17
2nd place, silver medalist(s)	Khairulnizam Afendy (MAS)	1	1	2	2	2	3	3	2	2	2	~~(4)~~	3	23
3rd place, bronze medalist(s)	Colin Cheng (SIN)	4	2	3	~~(13)~~; OCS	4	1	2	3	3	3	1	5	31
4	Keerati Bualong (THA)	3	4	4	~~(13)~~; DSQ	3	7	7	5	4	4	5	6	52
5	Shi Jian (CHN)	5	5	5	3	~~(13)~~; DSQ	4	4	13; DSQ	5	6	2	2	54
6	Waleed Al-Sharshani (QAT)	7	7	7	4	6	5	6	1	7	7	~~(9)~~	4	61
7	Abdulla Janahi (BRN)	6	6	6	~~(13)~~; RAF	5	6	5	4	6	5	6	7	62
8	Ruslan Jangazov (KAZ)	9	~~(10)~~	10	5	9	9	8	7	8	9	7	8	89
9	Ahmad Ahmadi (IRI)	10	9	8	~~(13)~~; OCS	7	8	9	6	9	8	8	9	91
10	Hamad Al-Hammadi (UAE)	~~(11)~~	11	11	6	10	10	10	9	10	10	10	10	107
11	Hammad Al-Hammad (KSA)	~~(12)~~	12	12	8	11	11	11	8	11	11	11	11	117
12	Ahmed Al-Hasani (OMA)	8	8	9	7	8	~~(13)~~; DNC	13; DNC	13; DNC	13; DNC	13; DNC	13; DNC	13; DNC	118
