= Sailing at the 2015 SEA Games – Women's match racing =

Sailing – Women's Match Racing Keelboat at the 2015 SEA Games
- Venue: National Sailing Centre
- Dates: 11 and 14 June 2015
- Competitors: 16 from 4 nations

Medalists
gold medal	Singapore (SIN)
silver medal	Malaysia (MAS)
bronze medal	Thailand (THA)

The Women's Match Racing Keelboat is a sailing event on the Sailing at the SEA Games programme at the National Sailing Centre.

== Schedule ==
All times are Singapore Standard Time (UTC+08:00)

Date	Time	Event
Thursday 12 June 2015	12:10	Heats
Friday 13 June 2015	12:50	Heats
Sunday, 14 June 2015	16:30	Final

== Results ==
=== Preliminary round ===
Rank	Team	W	L	Score
1	Singapore (SIN): Choo Bei Fen Jovina; Lam Peiyi Terena; Liu Xiaodan Dawn; Ng Hui Min Daniella	6	0	6
2	Malaysia (MAS): Nurul Elia Binte Anuar; Geh Cheow Lin; Nur Amirah Binte Hamid; Umi Norwahida Binte Sallahuddin	4	2	4
3	Thailand (THA): Jongkol Channart; Sai Chimsawat; Benjamas Poonpat; Yupa Tananong	2	4	2
4	Philippines (PHI): Rye Lee Caasi; Jerene Durana; Cyrin Ann Guingona; Rheycilla Morido Manaog	0	6	0

	MAS	PHI	SIN	THA
Malaysia (MAS)		2–0	0–2	2–0
Philippines (PHI)	0–2		0–2	0–2
Singapore (SIN)	2–0	2–0		2–0
Thailand (THA)	0–2	2–0	0–2	

=== Knockout round ===
Rank	Country	Score	Notes
1st place, gold medalist(s)	Singapore (SIN)	1	
2nd place, silver medalist(s)	Malaysia (MAS)	0	
3rd place, bronze medalist(s)	Thailand (THA)	1	
4	Philippines (PHI)	0	
