= Sailing at the 2015 SEA Games – Boys' Optimist =

Sailing – Men's Optimist at the 2015 SEA Games
- Venue: National Sailing Centre
- Dates: 10 to 11, 13 June 2015
- Competitors: 6 from 6 nations

Medalists
gold medal	Muhammad Fauzi Bin Kaman Shah	Malaysia
silver medal	Suthon Yampinid	Thailand
bronze medal	Toh Daniel Ian	Singapore

The boys' Optimist competition at the 2015 SEA Games was held at the National Sailing Centre. Sailors up to the age of 16 were allowed to participate.

== Schedule ==
All times are Singapore Standard Time (UTC+08:00)

Date	Time	Event
Wednesday, 10 June 2015	10:30	Heats
Thursday, 11 June 2015	12:30	Heats
Saturday, 13 June 2015	11:30	Final

== Results ==
Rank	Athlete	Points per Race									Medal race	Net points	Total score
Rank	Athlete	1	2	3	4	5	6	7	8	9	Medal race	Net points	Total score
1st place, gold medalist(s)	Muhammad Fauzi Bin Kaman Shah (MAS)	2	3	1	3	1	1	2			2	15	15
2nd place, silver medalist(s)	Suthon Yampinid (THA)	3	2	3	2	2	2	1			4	19	19
3rd place, bronze medalist(s)	Toh Daniel Ian (SIN)	1	1	2	1	3	3	3			6	20	20
4	Dazer Balangue (PHI)	5	4	4	4	4	5	4			8	38	38
5	Pyae Lin Wai Yan (MYA)	4	5	5	5	5	4	5			10	43	43
6	Lim Jenn Hau (BRU)	6	6	6	6	6	6	6			14	56	56

Notes

If sailors are disqualified or do not complete the race, 7 points are assigned for that race with 6 boats, 6 points for race with 5 boats, and 5 points for race with 4 boats

Scoring abbreviations are defined as follows:

- OCS – On course side of the starting line
- DSQ – Disqualified
- DNF – Did Not Finish
- DNS – Did Not Start
