= Sailing at the 2022 Asian Games – Women's ILCA 6 =

Women's ILCA 6 at the 2022 Asian Games
- Venue: Xiangshan Sailing Centre
- Date: 21–27 September 2023
- Competitors: 9 from 9 nations

Medalists
gold medal	Nur Shazrin Mohd Latif	Malaysia
silver medal	Stephanie Norton	Hong Kong
bronze medal	Victoria Chan	Singapore

The women's ILCA 6 competition at the 2022 Asian Games was held from 21 to 27 September 2023.

9 sailors were due to compete in 12 races, including one medal-race where points were doubled. However, no medal races were completed on 27 September as the wind conditions in the course area did not meet the requirement of racing.

== Schedule ==
All times are China Standard Time (UTC+08:00)

Date	Time	Event
Thursday, 21 September 2023	14:00	Race 1–2
Friday, 22 September 2023	11:10	Race 3–4
Saturday, 23 September 2023	14:00	Race 5–7
Monday, 25 September 2023	11:10	Race 8–9
Tuesday, 26 September 2023	14:00	Race 10–11
Wednesday, 27 September 2023	11:00	Medal race

== Results ==
Rank	Athlete	Opening series												MR	Total
Rank	Athlete	1	2	3	4	5	6	7	8	9	10	11	Total	MR	Total
1st place, gold medalist(s)	Nur Shazrin Mohd Latif (MAS)	1	2	2	1	3	1	4	~~(5)~~	4	4	3	25	X	25
2nd place, silver medalist(s)	Stephanie Norton (HKG)	4	5	4	4	7	3	2	3	~~(9)~~	3	2	37	X	37
3rd place, bronze medalist(s)	Victoria Chan (SGP)	6	7	1	2	1	2	6	2	~~(8)~~	6	5	38	X	38
4	Nethra Kumanan (IND)	2	4	6	~~(7)~~	2	7	3	7	5	1	4	41	X	41
5	Gu Min (CHN)	5	1	3	3	4	8	8	~~(9)~~	1	7	6	46	X	46
6	Sophia Montgomery (THA)	7	3	7	5	~~(9)~~	4	5	4	6	5	1	47	X	47
7	Yumiko Tombe (JPN)	3	6	5	6	6	5	~~(9)~~	8	3	2	7	51	X	51
8	Jung Hye-won (KOR)	~~(8)~~	8	8	8	8	6	7	1	2	8	8	64	X	64
9	Dhuha Al-Beshr (UAE)	~~(9)~~	9	9	9	5	9	1	6	7	9	9	73	X	73
