= Sailing at the 2015 SEA Games – Girls' Optimist =

Sailing – Women's Optimist at the 2015 SEA Games
- Venue: National Sailing Centre
- Dates: 10 to 11, 13 June 2015
- Competitors: 4 from 4 nations

Medalists
gold medal	Lai Xuan Yi Jodie	Singapore
silver medal	Kamonchanok Klahan	Thailand
bronze medal	Nor Nabila Natasha Binte Mohd Nazri	Malaysia

The girls' Optimist competition at the 2015 SEA Games was held at the National Sailing Centre. Sailors up to the age of 16 were allowed to participate.

== Schedule ==
All times are Singapore Standard Time (UTC+08:00)

Date	Time	Event
Wednesday, 10 June 2015	10:40	Heats
Thursday, 11 June 2015	14:00	Heats
Saturday, 13 June 2015	12:00	Final

== Results ==
Rank	Athlete	Points per Race									Medal race	Net points	Total score
Rank	Athlete	1	2	3	4	5	6	7	8	9	Medal race	Net points	Total score
1st place, gold medalist(s)	Lai Xuan Yi Jodie (SIN)	3	1	1	1	3	2	1			4	16	16
2nd place, silver medalist(s)	Kamonchanok Klahan (THA)	2	3	3	3	1	1	3			2	18	18
3rd place, bronze medalist(s)	Nor Nabila Natasha Binte Mohd Nazri (MAS)	1	2	2	2	2	3	2			6	20	20
4	Khaing Thae Yu (MYA)	4	4	4	4	4	4	4			8	36	36

Notes

If sailors are disqualified or do not complete the race, 7 points are assigned for that race with 6 boats, 6 points for race with 5 boats, and 5 points for race with 4 boats

Scoring abbreviations are defined as follows:

- OCS – On course side of the starting line
- DSQ – Disqualified
- DNF – Did Not Finish
- DNS – Did Not Start
