= Sailing at the 2006 Asian Games – Laser 4.7 =

Open Laser 4.7 at the 2006 Asian Games
- Venue: Doha Sailing Club
- Date: 5–12 December 2006
- Competitors: 8 from 8 nations

Medalists
gold medal	Colin Cheng	Singapore
silver medal	Waleed Al-Sharshani	Qatar
bronze medal	Nurul Elia Anuar	Malaysia

The open youth Laser 4.7 competition at the 2006 Asian Games in Doha was held from 5 to 12 December 2006.

== Schedule ==
All times are Arabia Standard Time (UTC+03:00)

Date	Time	Event
Tuesday, 5 December 2006	11:00	Race 1
Wednesday, 6 December 2006	11:00	Race 2
Thursday, 7 December 2006	11:00	Race 3
Thursday, 7 December 2006	11:00	Race 4
Thursday, 7 December 2006	11:00	Race 5
Friday, 8 December 2006	11:00	Race 6
Friday, 8 December 2006	11:00	Race 7
Friday, 8 December 2006	11:00	Race 8
Sunday, 10 December 2006	11:00	Race 9
Monday, 11 December 2006	11:00	Race 10
Monday, 11 December 2006	11:00	Race 11
Tuesday, 12 December 2006	11:00	Race 12

== Results ==
Legend

- DNC — Did not come to the starting area
- OCS — On course side

Rank	Athlete	Race												Total
Rank	Athlete	1	2	3	4	5	6	7	8	9	10	11	12	Total
1st place, gold medalist(s)	Colin Cheng (SIN)	2	1	~~(9)~~; OCS	2	1	6	1	2	3	3	1	1	23
2nd place, silver medalist(s)	Waleed Al-Sharshani (QAT)	~~(9)~~; OCS	3	1	1	3	2	9 OCS	5	2	1	4	2	33
3rd place, bronze medalist(s)	Nurul Elia Anuar (MAS)	6	~~(9)~~; OCS	3	7	2	1	2	1	4	2	5	5	38
4	Thanakan Korkerd (THA)	4	~~(7)~~	4	5	4	3	3	3	6	6	2	4	44
5	Bang Kyung-jae (KOR)	5	~~(6)~~	2	6	6	4	4	4	5	4	3	3	46
6	Akshan Jirasinha (SRI)	7	2	5	3	~~(8)~~	5	5	6	1	5	6	7	52
7	Muhanna Al-Doseri (BRN)	1	5	7	4	5	7	7	~~(8)~~	7	8	7	6	64
8	Sabahat Ullah Babur (PAK)	3	4	6	8	7	8	6	7	~~(9)~~; OCS	7	8	9 DNC	73
