= Sailing at the 2015 SEA Games – Team Racing Optimist =

Sailing – Team Racing Optimist at the 2015 SEA Games
- Venue: National Sailing Centre
- Dates: 6 to 9 June 2015
- Competitors: 21 from 4 nations

The Mixed Team Racing Optimist (U16) is a sailing event on the Sailing at the SEA Games programme at the National Sailing Centre.

== Schedule ==
All times are Singapore Standard Time (UTC+08:00)

Date	Time	Event
Saturday, 6 June 2015	10:30	Preliminary round
Sunday, 7 June 2015	11:30	Final

== Results ==
=== Preliminary round ===
Rank	Team	W	L	Score
1	Singapore (SIN): Koh Kia Ler James; Koh Yi Nian; Lai Xuan Yi Jodie; Muhammad Daniel Kei Bin Yazid; Toh Daniel Ian	3	0	3
2	Malaysia (MAS): Muhammad Fauzi Kaman Shah; Abdul Latif Mansor; Nor Nabila Natasha Mohd Nazri; Nur Aisah Rose Ramlee; Muhammad Dhiauddin Bin Rozain	2	1	2
3	Thailand (THA): Kamonchanok Klahan; Saranwong Poonpat; Voravong rachrattanaruk; Chanokchon Wangsuk; Suthon Yampinid	1	2	1
4	Myanmar (MYA): Aung Sithu Htet; Pyae Lin Wai Yan; Soe Myoe Ko Ko; Soe Sithu; Khaing Thae Yu	0	3	0

	MAS	MYA	SIN	THA
Malaysia (MAS)		1–0	0–1	1–0
Myanmar (MYA)	0–1		0–1	0–1
Singapore (SIN)	1–0	1–0		1–0
Thailand (THA)	1–0	0–1	0–1	

=== Knockout round ===
Rank	Country	Score	Notes
1st place, gold medalist(s)	Malaysia (MAS)	1	
2nd place, silver medalist(s)	Singapore (SIN)	0	
3rd place, bronze medalist(s)	Thailand (THA)	1	
4	Myanmar (MYA)	0	
