= Sailing at the 2018 Asian Games – Men's Laser =

Men's Laser at the 2018 Asian Games
- Venue: Ancol Beach Marina
- Date: 24–31 August 2018
- Competitors: 16 from 16 nations

Medalists
gold medal	Ha Jee-min	South Korea
silver medal	Khairulnizam Afendy	Malaysia
bronze medal	Ryan Lo	Singapore

The men's Laser competition at the 2018 Asian Games was held from 24 to 31 August 2018. It was also the qualification tournament for Laser Class at the 2020 Summer Olympics.

== Schedule ==
All times are Western Indonesia Time (UTC+07:00)

Date	Time	Event
Friday, 24 August 2018	11:15	Race 1
Friday, 24 August 2018	13:35	Race 2
Saturday, 25 August 2018	12:05	Race 3
Saturday, 25 August 2018	13:15	Race 4
Saturday, 25 August 2018	13:45	Race 5
Sunday, 26 August 2018	12:05	Race 6
Sunday, 26 August 2018	13:19	Race 7
Tuesday, 28 August 2018	13:35	Race 8
Tuesday, 28 August 2018	14:05	Race 9
Wednesday, 29 August 2018	12:45	Race 10
Wednesday, 29 August 2018	13:40	Race 11
Friday, 31 August 2018	13:15	Race 12

== Results ==
Legend

- DPI — Discretionary penalty imposed
- DSQ — Disqualification
- RET — Retired

Rank	Athlete	Race												Total
Rank	Athlete	1	2	3	4	5	6	7	8	9	10	11	12	Total
1st place, gold medalist(s)	Ha Jee-min (KOR)	2	1	1	1.8; DPI	2	3	3	4	1	1	2	~~(6)~~	21.8
2nd place, silver medalist(s)	Khairulnizam Afendy (MAS)	3	2	2	2	3	1	1	1	4	3	1	~~(9)~~	23
3rd place, bronze medalist(s)	Ryan Lo (SGP)	1	~~(4)~~	3	3	1	2	2	3	2	2	3	1	23
4	Kazumasa Segawa (JPN)	5	3	5	5	4	6	4	5	~~(8)~~	8	6	2	53
5	Keerati Bualong (THA)	4	7	4	6	5	7	7	~~(9)~~	3	6	4	4	57
6	Qiu Yulong (CHN)	6	6	6	7	6	~~(8)~~	5	2	5	5	5	7	60
7	Nicholas Bezy (HKG)	8	5	7	4	7	4	6	7	~~(17)~~; DSQ	7	17; RET	3	75
8	Abdulla Janahi (BRN)	~~(9)~~	8	8	9	8	5	8	6	6	9	7	5	79
9	Waleed Al-Sharshani (QAT)	7	~~(10)~~	10	8	9	10	9	10	7	4	9	8	91
10	Ahmad Zainuddin (INA)	~~(10)~~	9	9	10	10	9	10	8	10	10	8	10	103
11	Najeeb Ullah Khan (PAK)	11	11	11	~~(12)~~	12	11	12	11	9	11	10	11	120
12	Ruslan Jangazov (KAZ)	12	12	~~(13)~~	11	11	12	11	12	11	12	11	12	127
13	Hamza Al-Ali (UAE)	13	13	14	14	13	13	13	13	13	~~(15)~~	13	13	145
14	Masoud Janinasab (IRI)	~~(14)~~	14	12	13	14	14	14	14	12	13	12	14	146
15	Roshil Nishantha (SRI)	~~(15)~~	15	15	15	15	15	15	15	14	14	14	15	162
16	Duch Bunthuoen (CAM)	~~(16)~~	16	16	16	16	16	16	16	15	16	15	16	174
