= Sailing at the 2022 Asian Games – Men's ILCA 7 =

Men's ILCA 7 at the 2022 Asian Games
- Venue: Xiangshan Sailing Centre
- Date: 21–27 September 2023
- Competitors: 13 from 13 nations

Medalists
| gold medal | Ryan Lo | Singapore |
| silver medal | Ha Jee-min | South Korea |
| bronze medal | Vishnu Saravanan | India |

The men's Laser (as ILCA 7) competition at the 2022 Asian Games was held from 21 to 27 September 2023.

13 sailors were due to compete in 12 races, including one medal-race for top ten sailors where points were doubled. However, no medal races were completed on 27 September as the wind conditions in the course area did not meet the requirement of racing.

== Schedule ==
All times are China Standard Time (UTC+08:00)

| Date | Time | Event |
|---|---|---|
| Thursday, 21 September 2023 | 14:10 | Race 1–2 |
| Friday, 22 September 2023 | 11:00 | Race 3–4 |
| Saturday, 23 September 2023 | 14:10 | Race 5–7 |
| Monday, 25 September 2023 | 11:00 | Race 8–9 |
| Tuesday, 26 September 2023 | 14:10 | Race 10–11 |
| Wednesday, 27 September 2023 | 12:00 | Medal race |

== Results ==
Legend

- DNF — Did not finish
- RET — Retired
- UFD — U flag disqualification

| Rank | Athlete | Opening series | | | | | | | | | | | | MR | Total |
| Rank | Athlete | 1 | 2 | 3 | 4 | 5 | 6 | 7 | 8 | 9 | 10 | 11 | Total | MR | Total |
|---|---|---|---|---|---|---|---|---|---|---|---|---|---|---|---|
| 1st place, gold medalist(s) | Ryan Lo (SGP) | 4 | 4 | 2 | 1 | 2 | 1 | ~~(6)~~ | 2 | 3 | 3 | 4 | 26 | X | 26 |
| 2nd place, silver medalist(s) | Ha Jee-min (KOR) | 2 | 1 | 8 | 4 | 3 | 3 | ~~(9)~~ | 4 | 1 | 1 | 6 | 33 | X | 33 |
| 3rd place, bronze medalist(s) | Vishnu Saravanan (IND) | 1 | 5 | 1 | 7 | 5 | 2 | 5 | ~~(14)~~; RET | 5 | 2 | 1 | 34 | X | 34 |
| 4 | Nicholas Bezy (HKG) | 6 | 2 | 7 | 5 | 9 | 7 | 1 | 1 | 4 | 8 | ~~(14)~~; DNF | 50 | X | 50 |
| 5 | Arthit Mikhail Romanyk (THA) | 5 | ~~(7)~~ | 5 | 3 | 4 | 5 | 3 | 6 | 6 | 6 | 7 | 50 | X | 50 |
| 6 | Yoshihiro Suzuki (JPN) | 8 | 3 | 6 | 2 | 1 | 4 | 8 | 8 | ~~(9)~~ | 9 | 2 | 51 | X | 51 |
| 7 | Cui Yinsheng (CHN) | 3 | 6 | 4 | ~~(14)~~; UFD | 6 | 9 | 2 | 5 | 11 | 4 | 5 | 55 | X | 55 |
| 8 | Khairulnizam Afendy (MAS) | 7 | ~~(8)~~ | 3 | 6 | 8 | 8 | 7 | 7 | 7 | 5 | 3 | 61 | X | 61 |
| 9 | Abdulla Janahi (BRN) | 9 | 9 | 9 | 8 | 7 | 6 | ~~(10)~~ | 3 | 2 | 7 | 8 | 68 | X | 68 |
| 10 | Adil Al-Bastaki (UAE) | ~~(11)~~ | 11 | 11 | 9 | 10 | 10 | 4 | 9 | 8 | 11 | 9 | 92 | X | 92 |
| 11 | Faris Al-Bakri (QAT) | 10 | ~~(12)~~ | 10 | 12 | 11 | 12 | 11 | 10 | 10 | 12 | 11 | 109 | | |
| 12 | Muzammil Hassan (PAK) | ~~(14)~~; RET | 10 | 12 | 10 | 12 | 11 | 13 | 11 | 12 | 10 | 10 | 111 | | |
| 13 | Nhov Chan (CAM) | 12 | ~~(13)~~ | 13 | 11 | 13 | 13 | 12 | 12 | 13 | 13 | 12 | 124 | | |
