= Ha Jee-min =

South Korean Olympic sailor

Personal information
- Born: 21 March 1989 (age 37) Busan, South Korea
- Height: 186 cm (6 ft 1 in)

Korean name
- Hangul: 하지민
- RR: Ha Jimin
- MR: Ha Chimin

Sailing career
- Sport: Sailing
- Club: Busan Sailing Federation
- Class: Laser
Medal record
Men's sailing
Representing South Korea
Asian Games
Gold medal – first place	2010 Guangzhou	Laser
Gold medal – first place	2014 Incheon	Laser
Gold medal – first place	2018 Jakarta	Laser
Silver medal – second place	2022 Hangzhou	Men's dinghy ILCA7

Ha Jee-min (Korean: 하지민; born 21 March 1989 in Busan) is a South Korean sailor. He competed at the 2008, 2012 and 2016 Summer Olympics in the Men's Laser class, finishing in 28th, 24th and 13th place respectively.
