= Michele Regolo =

Italian sailor

Michele Gino Regolo (born 17 August 1978 in Fermo) is an Italian sailor. He competed at the 2012 Summer Olympics in the Men's Laser class finishing in 35th place.
