= Sailing at the 2012 Summer Olympics – Laser =

Men's Laser at the Games of the XXX Olympiad
- Line drawing of the Laser
- Venue: Weymouth and Portland National Sailing Academy
- Dates: 30 July – 6 August
- Competitors: 49 from 49 nations

Medalists
1st place, gold medalist(s)		Tom Slingsby	Australia
2nd place, silver medalist(s)		Pavlos Kontides	Cyprus
3rd place, bronze medalist(s)		Rasmus Myrgren	Sweden

The men's Laser was a sailing event on the Sailing at the 2012 Summer Olympics program in Weymouth and Portland National Sailing Academy. Eleven races (last one a medal race) were scheduled and completed. 49 sailors, on 49 boats, from 49 nations competed. Ten boats qualified for the medal race. For the medal race, the top ten boats qualified. Each position scored double points. All medal races were sailed on course area Nothe in front of Weymouth.

== Schedule ==
●	Practice race	●	Race on Portland	●	Race on Nothe	●	Race on West	●	Race on South	●	Medal race on Nothe

Date	July						August												
Date	26 Thu	27 Fri	28 Sat	29 Sun	30 Mon	31 Tue	1 Wed	2 Thu	3 Fri		4 Sat	5 Sun	6 Mon	7 Tue	8 Wed	9 Thu	10 Fri	11 Sat	12 Sun
Men's Laser				●	2	2	2	Spare day	2	2	2	Spare day	MR						

== Course areas and course configurations ==
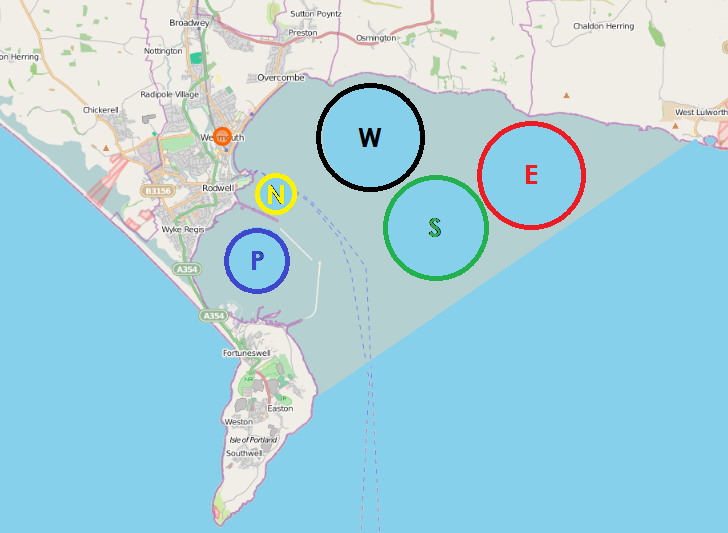
Course areas: Portland (P) Nothe (N) West (W) / South (S) East (E)

For the Laser course areas Portland, Nothe, West, and South were used. The location (50° 35.19’ N, 02° 26.54’ W) points to the center Portland course area, the location (50° 36.18’ N 02° 25.98’ W) points to the center of the Nothe course area, the location (50° 37.18’ N 02° 23.55’ W) points to the center of the West course area and the location (50° 35.71’ N 02° 22.08’ W) points to the center of the South course area. The target time for the course was 60 minutes for the races and 30 minutes for the medal race. The race management could choose from many course configurations.

== Results ==
Results of individual races
Pos	Helmsman	Country	I	II	III	IV	V	VI	VII	VIII	IX	X	MR	Tot	Pts
Gold medal	Tom Slingsby	Australia	2	1	2	6	9	2	14^{†}	1	1	1	18	57.0	43.0
Silver medal	Pavlos Kontides	Cyprus	9	4	1	1	2	4	12^{†}	7	7	4	20	71.0	59.0
Bronze medal	Rasmus Myrgren	Sweden	11	5	4	5	25^{†}	10	4	9	10	2	DPI 12	97.0	72.0
4	Tonči Stipanović	Croatia	5	6	20^{†}	4	3	1	8	13	6	15	16	97.0	77.0
5	Andrew Murdoch	New Zealand	12	8	17	18^{†}	1	7	13	15	3	3	8	105.0	87.0
6	Simon Grotelüschen	Germany	14	12	19^{†}	3	7	8	19	4	13	10	2	111.0	92.0
7	Paul Goodison	Great Britain	10	23^{†}	16	2	4	9	17	12	9	8	6	116.0	93.0
8	Alejandro Foglia	Uruguay	15	3	28	27	30^{†}	6	9	3	5	6	4	136.0	106.0
9	Juan Ignacio Maegli	Guatemala	1	10	7	13	5	20	7	10	27^{†}	21	14	129.0	108.0
10	Jean-Baptiste Bernaz	France	3	21	6	9	19	11	2	18	20	34^{†}	10	153.0	119.0
11	Julio Alsogaray	Argentina	20	7	5	11	12	23	1	BFD 50^{†}	26	7		162.0	112.0
12	Javier Hernández	Spain	34^{†}	17	13	15	26	13	6	17	2	9		152.0	118.0
13	Bruno Fontes	Brazil	17	2	12	19	10	27^{†}	23	21	16	5		152.0	125.0
14	Rutger van Schaardenburg	Netherlands	33^{†}	11	14	7	11	14	26	5	19	23		163.0	130.0
15	Colin Cheng	Singapore	4	25	26	20	27	34^{†}	10	2	17	14		179.0	145.0
16	Kristian Ruth	Norway	32	14	10	17	15	5	DNF 50^{†}	24	8	20		195.0	145.0
17	Kacper Ziemiński	Poland	22	13	8	24	18	15	28^{†}	11	22	12		173.0	145.0
18	Karl-Martin Rammo	Estonia	7	18	3	21	8	12	30	31	18	39^{†}		187.0	148.0
19	Thorbjørn Schierup	Denmark	36^{†}	16	24	8	23	16	5	23	24	18		193.0	157.0
20	Andreas Geritzer	Austria	6	20	22	16	6	28	22	22	32^{†}	16		190.0	158.0
21	Zsombor Berecz	Hungary	30	34^{†}	11	12	33	3	21	14	4	31		193.0	159.0
22	Gustavo Lima	Portugal	21	24	27	35^{†}	13	18	3	20	34	13		208.0	173.0
23	David Wright	Canada	18	15	9	30	14	24	41^{†}	6	29	38		225.0	184.0
24	Ha Jee-min	South Korea	8	9	15	14	35	DNF 50^{†}	DSQ 50	28	12	17		238.0	188.0
25	Cy Thompson	Virgin Islands	24	22	32	23	17	21	16	26	36^{†}	22		239.0	203.0
26	Evangelos Cheimonas	Greece	DPI 13	19	21	41	DSQ 50^{†}	33	15	30	15	19		256.0	206.0
27	Igor Lisovenko	Russia	28	40^{†}	36	22	24	19	25	16	28	33		271.0	231.0
28	Viktor Teplý	Czech Republic	29	27	31	34	32	25	11	34	37^{†}	11		271.0	234.0
29	Rob Crane	United States	35	42	30	28	16	26	18	8	33	44^{†}		280.0	236.0
30	Milivoj Dukić	Montenegro	26	33	35	32	22	30	24	38^{†}	23	24		287.0	249.0
31	Karlo Hmeljak	Slovenia	23	30	18	33	34	31	DNF 50^{†}	25	27	32		303.0	253.0
32	Matías del Solar	Chile	16	32	25	43	20	17	BFD 50^{†}	29	44	29		305.0	255.0
33	Mattias Lindfors	Finland	25	28	23	29	36	22	20	42^{†}	39	40		305.0	263.0
34	Wannes Van Laer	Belgium	19	26	29	26	29	38	31	BFD 50^{†}	42	36		326.0	276.0
35	Michele Regolo	Italy	31	35	46^{†}	10	21	32	43	35	43	30		326.0	280.0
36	James Espey	Ireland	38	44	39	36	46^{†}	42	27	27	25	35		359.0	313.0
37	Andrew Lewis	Trinidad and Tobago	46	43	38	40	28	47^{†}	34	46	14	26		362.0	315.0
38	Ricardo Montemayor	Mexico	39	41	44	46^{†}	45	29	29	40	11	42		366.0	320.0
39	Mustafa Çakır	Turkey	43	29	41	DNF 50^{†}	37	35	44	19	DNF 50	27		375.0	325.0
40	Andrey Quintero	Colombia	40	31	37	25	39	41	36	39	DNF 50^{†}	37		375.0	325.0
41	José Ruiz	Venezuela	45	46^{†}	34	37	41	36	33	44	35	28		379.0	333.0
42	Rokas Milevičius	Lithuania	37	37	33	38	43	37	40	43	31	46^{†}		385.0	339.0
43	Shi Jian	China	27	39	43	45	42	46^{†}	32	41	30	41		386.0	340.0
44	Valeriy Kudryashov	Ukraine	48^{†}	38	42	DPI 30	38	40	35	36	38	43		389.0	341.0
45	Youssef Akrout	Tunisia	41	36	40	44	31	39	39	33	45	48^{†}		396.0	348.0
46	Damien Desprat	Monaco	44	45^{†}	45	39	40	43	42	32	41	25		396.0	351.0
47	Khairulnizam Afendy	Malaysia	42	47	48^{†}	47	47	44	37	45	40	45		442.0	394.0
48	Keerati Bualong	Thailand	47	48	47	42	44	45	DSQ 50^{†}	37	47	47		454.0	404.0
49	Ilya Ignatiev	Kyrgyzstan	49^{†}	49	49	48	48	48	38	47	46	49		471.0	422.0

Scoring system: low-point system; Source:
Legend: – Qualified for medal race(s); BFD – Black flag disqualification; DNF – Did not finish; DPI – Discretionary penalty imposed; DSQ – Disqualified; † – Discarded race not counted in the overall result;

== Daily standings ==
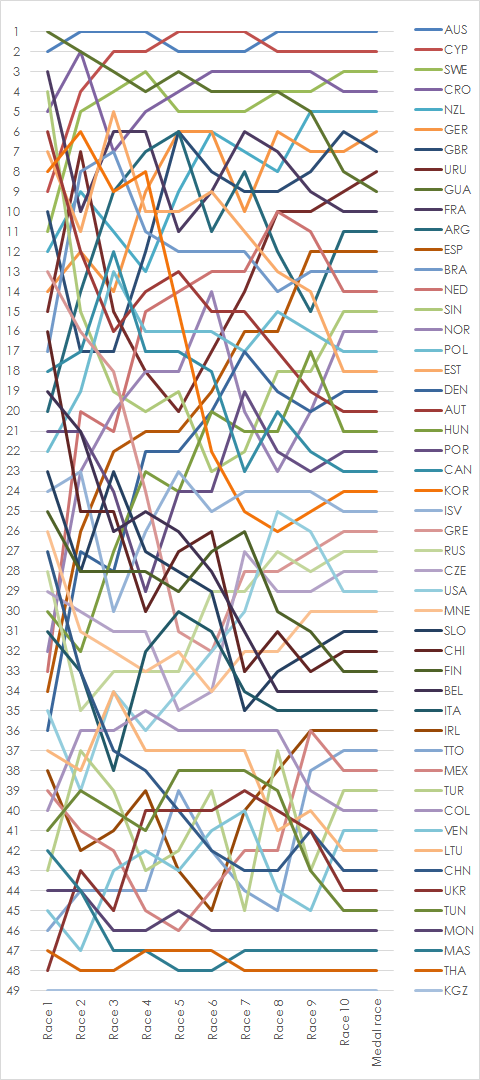
Graph showing the daily standings in the Men's Laser during the 2012 Summer Olympics
