= Rob Crane =

American yacht racer

Rob Crane is an American sailor. He competed at the 2012 Summer Olympics in the Men's Laser class.
