= Manami Doi =

Japanese sailor (born 1993)

Personal information
- Nationality: Japanese
- Born: August 29, 1993 (age 33) Yokohama, Japan
- Height: 166 cm (5 ft 5 in) (2012)
- Weight: 56 kg (123 lb) (2012)

Sailing career
- Sport: Sailing
- Class: Laser Radial
Medal record
Women's sailing
Representing Japan
World Championships
Bronze medal – third place	2017 Medemblik	Laser Radial
Asian Games
Silver medal – second place	2014 Incheon	Laser Radial
Gold medal – first place	2018 Jakarta-Palembang	Laser Radial
- Updated on July 2017

Manami Doi (土居 愛実, Doi Manami; born August 29, 1993 in Yokohama) is a Japanese sports sailor.

At the 2012 Summer Olympics, she competed in the Women's Laser Radial class, finishing in 31st place. At the 2016 Summer Olympics, she competed in the Women's Laser Radial class, finishing in 20th place. She competed at the 2020 Summer Olympics in Tokyo 2021, in Laser Radial and she finished in 15th place.
