= Mattias Lindfors =

Finnish sailor (born 1989)

Mattias Lindfors (12 April 1989, Helsinki) is a Finnish sailor. He competed at the 2012 Summer Olympics in the Men's Laser class finishing in 33rd.
