= Stephanie Norton =

Hong Kong sailor (born 2000)

Personal information
- Full name: Stephanie Louise Norton
- Nationality: Hong Kong
- Born: 18 September 2000 (age 25)
- Height: 1.75 m (5 ft 9 in)

Sailing career
- Sport: Sailing
- Class(es): ILCA 6, ILCA 4, 49erFX
Medal record
Women's sailing
Representing Hong Kong
Asian Games
Silver medal – second place	2022 Hangzhou	Women's ILCA6

Stephanie Louise Norton (Chinese: 洛雅怡, born 18 September 2000) is a Hong Kong sailor. She competed in the Laser Radial event at the 2020 Summer Olympics.
