= Elisa Yukie Yokoyama =

Singaporean sailor

Personal information
- Nationality: Singapore
- Born: 22 February 1997 Singapore
- Height: 1.47 m (4 ft 10 in)

Sailing career
- Sport: Sailing
Medal record
Sailing
Optimist World Championship
Gold medal – first place	2012 Boca Chica	Individual
Gold medal – first place	2012 Boca Chica	Team
Gold medal – first place	2011 Napier	Team
Optimist Asian Championship
Gold medal – first place	2012	Girl
Gold medal – first place	2012	Team
Silver medal – second place	2016	Team
Silver medal – second place	2016	Fleet
Southeast Asian Games
Gold medal – first place	Kuala Lumpur 2017	470
Gold medal – first place	Singapore 2015	420
Gold medal – first place	Jakarta-Palembang 2011	420

Elisa Yukie Yokoyama (born 22 February 1997) is a Singaporean sailor.

== Early life ==
Yokoyama studied in CHIJ Katong Convent Primary School and then at Raffles Girls’ School.

She started sailing and racing at 9 years old.

== Sailing career ==
Yokoyama won her first medal at the 2009 Optimist World Championship in Brazil, clinching the bronze medal in the team racing event.

In 2011, Yokoyama won her first Southeast Asian Games (SEA Games) medal by winning the gold medal in the Optimist class.

In 2011, she was also part of the racing team for the Nation's Cup (Miami Herald Trophy) at the 2011 Optimist World Championship, which won the gold medal.

At the 2015 SEA Games, Yokoyama, with her crew, Samantha Annabelle Neubronner, won the Under-19 double-handed 420 class. After the SEA games, Yokoyama was left without a crew as Samantha stopped sailing to focus on her studies.

Yokoyama then paired up with Cheryl Teo as her new crew for the 420 class in 2015. After competing together at the 2016 youth world championships in the 420 class, they decided to switch to the 470 class in August 2016. Both of them deferred their studies in 2017 to concentrate for the 2018 Asian Games and qualifying in the 470 class for the 2020 Summer Olympics at Tokyo, Japan.

At the 2017 470 World Championships held in Greece, Yokoyama injured her arm when a mast fell and hit her arm during the boat setup with Teo. As a result, they could not race in the championships. However, Yokoyama managed to recover in time for the 2017 SEA Games held in Kuala Lumpur, Malaysia, where she and Teo won the gold medal in the 470 class.

At the 2018 Asian Games, Yokoyama and Teo managed a fourth place placing in the 470 class.

== Personal life ==
Yokoyama has an elder sister, Natasha Yokoyama, who also represents Singapore in sailing. She also has an younger sister, Adelia Naomi Yokoyama, who represents Singapore in bowling.

Yokoyama is currently an environmental studies student at the National University of Singapore and is on an NUS Global Merit Scholarship. She deferred her studies to train for the 2020 Summer Olympics.

== Awards ==
- 2013 Singapore Sports Award - Sportsgirl of the Year
