= Ilia Ignatev =

Kyrgyzstani sailor (born 1992)

Ilia Ignatev (born 9 May 1992) is a Kyrgyz sailor. He competed at the 2012 Summer Olympics in the Men's Laser class.
