= Nur Shazrin Mohd Latif =

Malaysian sailor (born 1998)

Nur Shazrin Mohamad Latif
Personal information
- Full name: Nur Shazrin binti Mohamad Latif
- Nickname: Eyin
- Nationality: Malaysian
- Born: 2 February 1998 (age 28) Pasir Gudang, Johor, Malaysia

Sailing career
- Sport: Sailing
- Class(es): ILCA 6, Byte
Medal record
Women's Sailing
Representing Malaysia
Asian Games
Gold medal – first place	2022 Hangzhou	Women's ILCA6
Bronze medal – third place	2018 Jakarta-Palembang	Laser radial
Southeast Asian Games
Gold medal – first place	2015 Singapore	Women's Youth Laser Radial
Gold medal – first place	2015 Singapore	Women's Team Racing Laser Radial
Silver medal – second place	2017 Kuala Lumpur	Women's Racing Laser Radial
Silver medal – second place	2025 Thailand	Women's ILCA6
Bronze medal – third place	2017 Kuala Lumpur	Women's Team Racing Laser Radial
- Updated on September 2023

Nur Shazrin binti Mohamad Latif (born 2 February 1998) is a Malaysian competitive sailor. She won a gold medal at the 2022 Asian Games for the Women's ILCA 6, the first gold medal for the nation in the games. She won two gold medals at the 2015 Southeast Asian Games. She competed at the 2016 Summer Olympics in Rio de Janeiro, in the women's Laser Radial. She won a bronze medal in Laser Radial at the 2018 Asian Games in Jakarta. She competed at the 2020 Summer Olympics in Tokyo 2021, in Laser Radial. She is the flag bearer of Malaysia at the 2024 Summer Olympics opening ceremony alongside diver Bertrand Rhodict Lises.

Olympic Games
Preceded by Lee Zii Jia; Goh Liu Ying	Flagbearer for Malaysia (with Bertrand Rhodict Lises); Paris 2024	Succeeded by Incumbent
