= Vishnu Saravanan =

Indian sailor (born 1999)

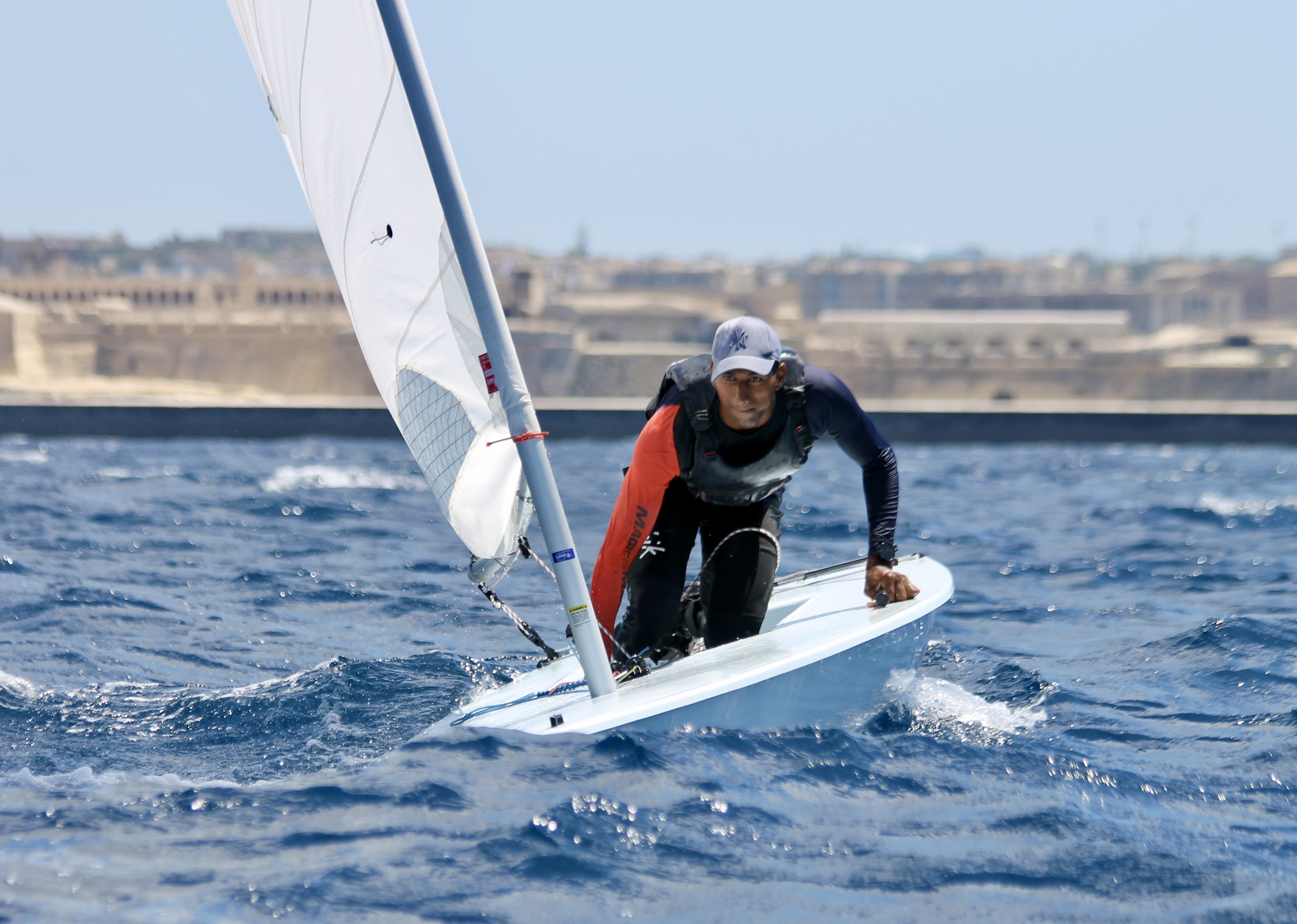
- Training at Malta before Tokyo Olympics

Personal information
- Nationality: Indian
- Born: 24 February 1999 (age 27) Vellore, Tamil Nadu, India
- Height: 1.88 m (6 ft 2 in)
- Weight: 85 kg (187 lb)

Sailing career
- Sport: Sailing
- Club: Army Yachting Node Mumbai
- Coached by: Nenad Viali
- Class: Laser Standard
Medal record
Asian Games
Bronze medal – third place	2022 Hangzhou	Men's dinghy ILCA7
Laser Under 21 World Championships
Bronze medal – third place	2019 Split	Laser

Vishnu Saravanan (born 24 February 1999) is an Indian sailor. He qualified for the Tokyo Olympic Games. He is the first Indian sailor to qualify for the 2024 Summer Olympics. He finished 26th out of 152 sailors from 52 countries in the ILCA7 world championships at Adelaide to qualify for the 2024 Summer Olympic Games in Paris.

== Early life ==
Saravanan is from Vellore, Tamil Nadu but is based in Mumbai. He is a subedar in the Indian Army. He trains at the Army Yachting Node in Mumbai. His father, Ramachandran Saravanan, was a national sailor and his sister, Ramya Saravanan, also represented India in the sailing events abroad.

== Career ==
In 2019, Saravanan won a bronze medal at the Under-21 World Championships in Croatia, which was his first notable achievement. He won the bronze medal at the Men's dinghy ILCA7 event in the 2022 Asian Games. He became the second Indian sailor to qualify for more than one Olympics after Farokh Tarapore, who took part in the 1984, 1988 and 1992 Olympics. The sailing quota place he earned, is for the country, and the National Olympic Committee is likely to nominate him. He spent a month training for the Olympics at Marseille. He is training under Croatian coach Milan Vujasinovic. He trained alongside Pavlos Kontides of Cyprus, a silver medallist at 2012 London and Tonci Stipanovic of Croatia, a silver medallist at Rio and Tokyo at Marseille. They will also be some of his tough rivals at Paris. "The fighter mentality makes me want to beat the top guys before they quit,” Saravanan was quoted in the Hindustan Times on 11 June 2024.
