= Ryan Lo =

Singaporean sailor (born 1997)

Personal information
- Full name: Ryan Lo Jun Han
- Born: 26 February 1997 (age 29) Singapore
- Height: 1.77 m (5 ft 10 in)

Sailing career
- Sport: Sailing
- Class: ILCA 7
Medal record
Men's sailing
Representing Singapore
World Championships
Gold medal – first place	2011 Napier	Optimist (Team)
World Cup
Silver medal – second place	2019 Marseille	Laser
Asian Games
Gold medal – first place	2022 Hangzhou	ILCA 7
Bronze medal – third place	2018 Jakarta-Palembang	Laser
Bronze medal – third place	2010 Guangzhou	Optimist
Asian Championships
Silver medal – second place	2008 Bali	Optimist
Southeast Asian Games
Gold medal – first place	2017 Kuala Lumpur	Laser
Gold medal – first place	2017 Kuala Lumpur	Laser (Team)
Gold medal – first place	2019 Philippines	Laser
Gold medal – first place	2023 Cambodia	Laser
Gold medal – first place	2025 Thailand	ILCA7
Silver medal – second place	2015 Singapore	Laser (Team)

Ryan Lo Jun Han (born 26 February 1997) is a Singaporean sailor. Lo is the reigning Asiad champion of the ILCA 7 class and competed in the Laser event at the 2020 Summer Olympics. He is also a three-time SEA Games individual gold medalist of the same discipline.

On 6 July 2024, the Singapore National Olympic Council (SNOC), designated to him and the female sprinter athlete Shanti Pereira as the flag bearers to the París 2024 Olympic Games.

Olympic Games
Preceded by Yu Mengyu; Loh Kean Yew	Flagbearer for Singapore; Paris 2024; With: Shanti Pereira	Succeeded by Incumbent
