= Zhang Dongshuang =

China sailor

Personal information
- Nationality: Chinese
- Born: 13 December 1989 (age 35); Shanghai

Sport
- Sport: Sailing

Zhang Dongshuang (born 13 December 1989) is a Chinese sailor. She competed in the Laser Radial event at the 2020 Summer Olympics.
