= Kamolwan Chanyim =

Thai sailor (born 1996)

Kamolwan Chanyim OLY
Personal information
- Nickname: Bambam
- Nationality: Thai
- Born: 3 January 1996 (age 30) Chonburi, Thailand
- Height: 1.75 m (5 ft 9 in) (2016)
- Weight: 65 kg (143 lb) (2016)

Sport
- Country: Thailand
- Sport: Sailing
Medal record
Women's sailing
Representing Thailand
Asian Games
Bronze medal – third place	2014 Incheon	Laser Radial
Southeast Asian Games
Silver medal – second place	2011 Indonesia	Laser Radial
Bronze medal – third place	2013 Myanmar	Laser Radial
Gold medal – first place	2015 Singapore	Laser Radial
Gold medal – first place	2019 Philippines	Laser Radial

Kamolwan Chanyim (born 3 January 1996) is a Thai competitive sailor. She was born in Chonburi province eastern of Thailand. She graduated with first-class honors in International Business Management from Burapha University. Her father is an influencer for sailing; she began sailing when she was 8. In the earlier she hated sailing but later when she did better she changed her mindset: " I started to think that anything is possible if you work hard at it."

She competed at the 2016 Summer Olympics in Rio de Janeiro, in the women's Laser Radial. She is also the first Thai woman that qualified for the Olympics in sailboat. She finished rank 34 in Laser Radial competition for 2020 Summer Olympics, this is second appearance in Summer Olympics first was in Rio 2016 ranked 32.
