= Colin Cheng =

Singaporean sailor

Personal information
- Native name: 鄭忻如
- Born: Cheng Xinru; 10 September 1989 (age 37) Singapore
- Height: 175 cm (5 ft 9 in)
- Weight: 80 kg (176 lb)

Sailing career
- Sport: Sailing
- Coached by: Brett Beyer
- Classes: Laser 4.7, Laser Standard
Medal record
Men's sailing
Representing Singapore
World Championships
Gold medal – first place	2006 Hourtin	Laser 4.7
Asian Games
Gold medal – first place	2006 Doha	Laser 4.7
Silver medal – second place	2010 Guangzhou	Laser
Bronze medal – third place	2014 Incheon	Laser
Asian Championships
Silver medal – second place	2008 Bali	Laser
- Updated on 11 June 2016

Colin Cheng Xinru (Chinese: 鄭忻如; pinyin: Zhèng Xīnrú; born 10 September 1989) is a Singaporean sailor. He has been cited as "the top Asian sailor in the men’s laser standard class".

Cheng won the gold medal at the Laser 4.7 competition at the 2006 Asian Games held in Doha. He switched to Laser class and won the silver medal at the 2010 Asian Games held in Guangzhou, China.

Cheng has resided in New South Wales, Australia since 2010, where he has studied and trained at the University of New South Wales.

Cheng competed at the 2012 Summer Olympics in the men's Laser class, finishing 15th of 49.

In 2014, Cheng competed in the 2014 Asian Games held in Incheon, South Korea and won the bronze medal.

In 2015, he competed in the 2015 SEA Games. In March–April 2016 he finished 13th in the Trofeo Princesa Sofía regatta in Spain and in May 2016 he finished 26th out of 112 in the Laser World Championships in Riviera Nayarit, Mexico. He competed at the 2016 Summer Olympics.
