= Nethra Kumanan =

Indian sailor

Personal information
- Nationality: India
- Born: 21 August 1997 (age 29) Chennai, Tamil Nadu, India
- Height: 1.62 m (5 ft 4 in)

Sailing career
- Sport: Sailing
- Club: Tamil Nadu Sailing Association
- Coached by: Mr Tamas Eszes
- Class: ILCA 6

Nethra Kumanan (born 21 August 1997) is an Olympian from India in the Sport of ILCA6 Women (popularly known as Laser Radial Sailing). She qualified as Olympic qualifier for the 2024 Paris Summer Olympics at the Last Chance Regatta, in Hyeres, France on 26 April 2024. She claimed the quota under the Emerging Nations Programme and acknowledged as the second to qualify from India after Vishnu Saravanan.

== Early life and education ==
Nethra Kumanan was born in Chennai, Tamil Nadu, India. Her father V. C. Kumanan is an entrepreneur who runs an IT company and her mother Sreeja Kumanan is a HR Professional.

Nethra attended Pathashaala Montessori School up to Standard 6 and studied at The School, KFI (Krishnamurti Foundation India) till Standard 10. She also attended the National Institute of Schooling (NIOS) to finish her 12th level. This helped her to stay focused on her sailing training.

Nethra has recently completed her B.Tech in Mechanical Engineering from SRM University, Vadapalani campus. She is now pursuing her MBA. Earlier, she joined Anna University and took up Mechanical Engineering under the sports quota in 2017 but had to drop out after a year to prepare for the Asian Games.

=== Co-curricular activities ===
In her formative years, she learnt a lot of arts and sports and won many trophies. These include Bharatanatyam which she learnt for about six years under her guru Alarmel Valli, a leading Indian Classical dancer and choreographer, a Padma Shri and Padma Bhushan awardee. She was an avid arts person and has won trophies at Global Art International Competitions held in Singapore, Vietnam, Indonesia in various years. She also learnt Kalaripayattu, mountain biking, tennis, skating, basketball, swimming and was also good in her academics.

She started learning to sail at a summer class in 2010 at Tamil Nadu Sailing Association's 'Summer Sailing Camp'.

== Career ==
Nethra is the first Indian woman to qualify for the 2020 Tokyo Olympics for the sailing sport. At her maiden Olympics, she finished 35th overall and was 15th in the third race of the Laser Radial category for women out of 44 participants.

Earlier in January 2020, Nethra Kumanan became the first Indian woman to win a bronze medal at the Hempel Sailing World Cup Series, in Miami, U.S.A. She has also won over 20 medals at national and international sailing championships and trained at India, Israel, Hungary, Denmark and Spain.

Nethra has represented India at the Asian Games in 2014 in South Korea and in 2018 in Jakarta where she finished seventh and fifth respectively.

== Past performances ==
=== Olympics ===
Rank	Event	Year	Location
35	Laser Radial	2020	Tokyo, Japan

=== World Championships ===
Rank	Event	Year	Location
70	ILCA6	2023	Hague, Netherlands
51	ILCA6	2022	Texas, USA
23	Laser Radial	2021	Mussanah, Oman
66	Laser Radial	2019	Sakaiminato, Japan
78	Laser Radial	2018	Aarhus, DEN

=== Asian Games ===
Rank	Event	Year	Location
5	Laser Radial	2018	Indonesia
7	Laser Radial	2014	S Korea

=== Asian Championships ===
Rank	Event	Year	Location
Gold	ILCA6	2022	Pattaya, Thailand
Silver	ILCA6	2022	Abu Dhabi, UAE
Gold	ILCA6	2021	Mussanah, Oman
4	Laser Radial	2019	Singapore, SIN

=== Class European Championships ===
Rank	Event	Year	Location
56	Laser Radial	2020	Gdansk, POL
24	ILCA6	2023	Andorra, Italy
Bronze	Europa Cup	2022	Balatonfured, Hungary

=== World Cup, Princess Sophy, etc. ===
Rank	Event	Year	Location
3	Laser Radial	2020	Miami, FL, USA
41	Laser Radial	2021	Medemblik, NED
49	Laser Radial	2019	Genoa, ITA
32	ILCA6	2023	Palma Mallorca, Spain

=== Class Championships Juniors ===
Rank	Event	Year	Location
39	Laser Radial	2017	Nieuwpoort, BEL
Gold	Laser Radial	2015	ASAF Youth
