= Khairulnizam Afendy =

Malaysian sailor (born 1993)

Khairulnizam Mohd Afendy
Personal information
- Born: 27 May 1993 (age 33) Kedah, Malaysia

Sailing career
- Sport: Sailing
Medal record
Men's sailing
Representing Malaysia
Asian Games
Silver medal – second place	2018 Jakarta–Palembang	Laser
Silver medal – second place	2014 Incheon	Laser
Bronze medal – third place	2026 Aichi-Nagoya	ILCA 7
Southeast Asian Games
Gold medal – first place	2015 Singapore	Team Racing Laser Standard
Gold medal – first place	2013 Naypyidaw	Laser Standard
Silver medal – second place	2017 Kuala Lumpur	Team Racing Laser Standard
Silver medal – second place	2015 Singapore	Laser Standard
Silver medal – second place	2025 Thailand	ILCA7
Bronze medal – third place	2019 Philippines	Laser Standard
Bronze medal – third place	2017 Kuala Lumpur	Laser Standard

Khairulnizam bin Mohd Afendy (born 27 May 1993) is a Malaysian sailor who competed at the 2012 Summer Olympics in the men's Laser class, finishing 47th.
