= Keerati Bualong =

Thai sailor (born 1992)

Personal information
- Born: December 6, 1992 (age 32)

Sport
- Country: Thailand
- Sport: Sailing

Keerati Bualong is a Thai sailor. In 2012, he became the first Thai to qualify for the Olympics in the men's one person dinghy. He competed at the 2012 Summer Olympics in the Men's Laser class. Keerati was the first Asian to win the Laser Radial Youth Worlds and has many medals to his name.

== Medals ==
Gold Medals:

- Asian Sailing Championships 2012 (Laser Standard)
- South East Asian (SEA) Games 2011 (Laser Radial)
- Asian Games 2010 (Laser Radial)
- Asia Pacific Laser Championships 2010 (Laser Standard)
- Laser Radial Youth World Championship 2009 (Laser Radial)
- Byte CII Asian Championship 2009 (Byte CII)
- Byte CII Asia Pacific Championship 2009 (Byte CII)
- Byte CII Open World Championship 2007 (Byte CII)

Silver Medals:

- Volvo Youth Sailing ISAF World Championship 2010 (Laser Radial)

Bronze Medals:

- Asian Beach Games 2008 (Laser 4.7)
