= SEA Games sports =

Sports played in the Southeast Asian Games

This is a list of sports played in the biennial Southeast Asian Games. Unlike the Olympic Games, there are no official limits to the number of sports which may be contested, and the range may be decided by the organising host pending approval by the Southeast Asian Games Federation. Albeit for some core sports which must be featured, the host is also free to introduce other sports. Over time, this has meant as much as 43 sports in the 24th edition of the games, and the programme has included relatively obscure sports such as arnis, finswimming and pétanque.

In the 2019 Southeast Asian Games, medals in 56 different sports were contested—the most in its history.

== History ==
The Southeast Asian Peninsular Games, as the Southeast Asian Games was then known, was first held in Bangkok in 1959 with 12 sports, namely aquatics, athletics, badminton, basketball, boxing, cycling, football, shooting, table tennis, tennis, volleyball, and weightlifting.

== SEAGF Charter and Rules ==
Before and up to 2023, the SEAGF Charter and Rules dictated that the following sports be on the program:

- Minimum of 22 sports
  - Category 1: Aquatics and Athletics
  - Category 2 (at least 14): Sports at the Olympic and Asian Games
  - Category 3 (up to 8): Regional/Traditional sports

In 2023, the charter was modified to specify the following:

- Minimum of 36 sports
  - Category 1A: Aquatics and Athletics
  - Category 1B (at least 10): Sports at the Summer Olympic Games
  - Category 2 (at least 10): Sports at the:
    - Olympic Games (summer/winter)
    - Asian Games
    - Asian Indoor and Martial Arts Games
  - Category 3 (up to 4): Regional/Traditional sports

== Sports ==
The following sports (or disciplines of a sport) are part of the current program or were contested before, and are listed alphabetically according to the name used by the IOC. The figures in each cell indicate the number of events for each sport contested at the respective Games; a bullet (•) denotes that the sport was contested as a demonstration sport. A "Y" is used to indicate that a sport was played, but the number of events is not yet established. An "X" is used to indicate a sport that is set to be included in a future event.

Twelve of the sports (Aquatics, baseball and softball, basketball, cycling, equestrian, football, gymnastics, handball, hockey, volleyball, winter sports, and wrestling) consist of multiple disciplines. Disciplines from the same sport are grouped under the same colour:

Aquatics – Baseball and softball – Basketball – Cycling – Equestrian – Football – Gymnastics – Volleyball – Winter sports – Wrestling

| Sport (Discipline) | Body | 59 | 61 | 65 | 67 | 69 | 71 | 73 | 75 | 77 | 79 | 81 | 83 | 85 | 87 | 89 | 91 | 93 | 95 | 97 | 99 | 01 | 03 | 05 | 07 | 09 | 11 | 13 | 15 | 17 | 19 | 21 | 23 | 25 | 27 |
|---|---|---|---|---|---|---|---|---|---|---|---|---|---|---|---|---|---|---|---|---|---|---|---|---|---|---|---|---|---|---|---|---|---|---|---|
| Artistic swimming | WAquatics | | | | | | | | | | | | | | | | | | | | | | Y | | | | | 5 | | 3 | 5 | | | 3 | X |
| Diving | WAquatics | | | 4 | 4 | 4 | 4 | 4 | 4 | 4 | 4 | 4 | 4 | 4 | 4 | 4 | 4 | Y | Y | Y | Y | Y | 8 | 10 | 10 | 8 | 8 | 8 | 8 | 13 | 4 | 8 | 4 | 4 | X |
| Open water swimming | WAquatics | | | | | | | | | | | | | | | | | | | | | | | | | | 4 | | | | 1 | | | 3 | |
| Swimming | WAquatics | 6 | 13 | 24 | Y | Y | Y | Y | Y | Y | Y | Y | Y | Y | Y | Y | Y | Y | Y | Y | Y | Y | 32 | 32 | 32 | 32 | 38 | 32 | 38 | 40 | 38 | 40 | 39 | 38 | X |
| Water polo | WAquatics | | | 1 | 1 | 1 | 1 | 1 | 1 | 1 | 1 | 1 | 1 | 1 | 1 | 1 | 1 | 1 | 1 | 1 | 1 | 1 | 1 | 1 | 1 | 1 | 2 | 1 | 2 | 2 | 2 | | 2 | 2 | X |
| Archery | WArchery | | | | | | | | | 12 | 12 | 12 | 12 | 12 | 4 | 4 | 4 | 4 | 4 | 4 | 4 | 4 | 4 | 8 | 8 | 8 | 10 | 10 | 10 | 10 | 10 | 10 | | 10 | X |
| Arnis | WEKAF | | | | | | | | | | | | | | | | • | | | | | | | 6 | | | | | | | 20 | | 12 | | |
| Athletics | WAthletics | 28 | Y | Y | Y | Y | Y | Y | Y | Y | Y | Y | Y | Y | Y | Y | Y | Y | Y | Y | Y | Y | 45 | 42 | 45 | 45 | 46 | 47 | 46 | 45 | 48 | 45 | 47 | 47 | X |
| Badminton | BWF | 2 | 5 | 7 | 5 | 5 | 7 | 7 | 7 | 7 | 7 | 7 | 7 | 7 | 7 | 7 | 7 | 7 | 7 | 7 | 7 | 7 | 7 | 7 | 7 | 7 | 7 | 5 | 7 | 7 | 7 | 7 | 8 | 7 | X |
| Baseball | WBSC | | | | | | | | | | | | | | | | | | | | | | | 1 | 1 | | 1 | | | | 1 | | | 1 | |
| Softball | WBSC | | | | | | | | | | | | | | | | | | | | | | | 2 | 2 | | 1 | | 2 | | 2 | | | 2 | |
| Baseball5 | WBSC | | | | | | | | | | | | | | | | | | | | | | | | | | | | | | | | | 1 | |
| 3x3 Basketball | FIBA | | | | | | | | | | | | | | | | | | | | | | | | | | | | | | 2 | 2 | 2 | 2 | |
| Basketball | FIBA | 1 | 1 | 2 | 2 | 2 | 2 | 2 | 2 | 2 | 2 | 2 | 2 | 2 | 2 | 2 | 2 | 2 | 2 | 2 | 1 | 2 | 2 | | 2 | | 2 | 2 | 2 | 2 | 2 | 2 | 2 | 2 | X |
| Billiards and snooker | WCBS | | | | | | | | | | | | | | Y | | Y | Y | Y | Y | Y | Y | 12 | 13 | 12 | 10 | 10 | 12 | 10 | 7 | 10 | 10 | 10 | 10 | X |
| Bodybuilding | IFBB | | | | | | | | | | | | | | | | | | | | | | 8 | 6 | 5 | | | 5 | | | | 10 | | | |
| Bowling | IBF | | | | | | | | | | | | | | | | | | | | | | | 10 | 11 | | 10 | | 10 | 11 | 9 | 6 | | 6 | X |
| Boxing | WBoxing | Y | Y | Y | Y | Y | Y | Y | Y | Y | Y | Y | Y | Y | Y | Y | Y | Y | Y | Y | Y | Y | 9 | 14 | 17 | 15 | 14 | 14 | 11 | 6 | 13 | 13 | 16 | 17 | X |
| Bridge | WBF | | | | | | | | | | | | | | | | | | | | | | | | | | 9 | | | | | | | | |
| Canoeing (sprint) | PW | | | | | | | | | | | | | | | | | | | | | | 15 | 7 | 12 | | 15 | 16 | 17 | | 7 | 11 | | 10 | |
| Canoeing (slalom) | PW | | | | | | | | | | | | | | | | | | | | | | | | | | | | | | | | | 2 | |
| Chess | FIDE | | | | | | | | | | | | | | | | | | | | | | 8 | 8 | | | 9 | 18 | | | 5 | 10 | | 8 | |
| Cricket | ICC | | | | | | | | | | | | | | | | | | | | | | | | | | | | | 3 | | | 8 | 4 | X |
| Ouk chaktrang | | | | | | | | | | | | | | | | | | | | | | | | | | | | | | | | | 7 | | |
| Xiangqi | WXF | | | | | | | | | | | | | | | | | | | | | | | | | | | | | | | 4 | 4 | | |
| BMX | UCI | | | | | | | | | | | | | | | | | | | | | | | | | | 2 | 2 | | 2 | 3 | | | 2 | X |
| Mountain biking | UCI | | | | | | | | | | | | | | | | | | | | | | | 4 | 4 | 4 | 4 | 5 | | | 4 | 4 | 5 | 3 | |
| Road cycling | UCI | 3 | 3 | 10 | 13 | 8 | | | | | | | | | | | | | | | | | Y | 5 | 4 | 4 | 5 | 6 | 6 | 5 | 6 | 8 | 4 | 7 | X |
| Track cycling | UCI | | | | | | | | | | | | | | | | | | | | | | | 3 | 11 | | 7 | | | 13 | | | | 5 | X |
| Aquathlon | WTriathlon | | | | | | | | | | | | | | | | | | | | | | | | | | | | | | | | 3 | 3 | |
| Duathlon | WTriathlon | | | | | | | | | | | | | | | | | | | | | | | | 2 | | | | | | | 3 | 2 | 3 | |
| Triathlon | WTriathlon | | | | | | | | | | | | | | | | | | | | | | | 2 | 2 | | | | 2 | 2 | 3 | 4 | 2 | 5 | X |
| Dancesport | WDSF | | | | | | | | | | | | | | | | | | | | | | | 2 | 10 | | | | | | 14 | 12 | 2 | | X |
| Disc golf | WFDF | | | | | | | | | | | | | | | | | | | | | | | | | | | | | | | | | • | |
| E-sports | GEF | | | | | | | | | | | | | | | | | | | | | | | | | | | | | | 6 | 10 | 9 | 6 | X |
| Dressage | FEI | | | | | | | | | | | | | | | | | | | | | | | | 2 | | 2 | 2 | 2 | 2 | | | | 2 | X |
| Endurance | FEI | | | | | | | | | | | | | | | | | | | | | | | | | | | | | 2 | | | | | |
| Eventing | FEI | | | | | | | | | | | | | | | | | | | | | | | | 2 | | 2 | 2 | | | | | | 2 | X |
| Jumping | FEI | | | | | | | | | | | | | | | | | | | | | | | 2 | 2 | | 2 | 2 | 2 | 2 | | | | 2 | X |
| Fencing | FIE | | | | | | | | | | | | | | | | | | | | | | 10 | 12 | 12 | | 12 | | 12 | 6 | 12 | 12 | 12 | 12 | X |
| Finswimming | CMAS | | | | | | | | | | | | | | | | | | | | | | 16 | | | 16 | 16 | | | | | 13 | 24 | | |
| Floorball | IFF | | | | | | | | | | | | | | | | | | | | | | | | | | | • | 2 | | 2 | | 2 | 2 | |
| Football | FIFA | 1 | 1 | 1 | 1 | 1 | 1 | 1 | 1 | 1 | 1 | 1 | 1 | 2 | 1 | 1 | 1 | 1 | 2 | 2 | 1 | 2 | 2 | 2 | 2 | 2 | 1 | 2 | 1 | 2 | 2 | 2 | 2 | 2 | X |
| Futsal | FIFA | | | | | | | | | | | | | | | | | | | | | | | | 2 | | 2 | 2 | | 2 | | 2 | | 2 | X |
| Golf | IGF | | | | | | | | | | | | | | | | | | | | | | | 4 | 4 | 4 | 4 | 4 | 4 | 4 | 4 | 4 | 4 | 4 | X |
| Artistic | WGymnastics | | | | | | | | | | | | | | | | | | | | | | 14 | 13 | 13 | | 14 | | 14 | 12 | 12 | 14 | 8 | 10 | X |
| Rhythmic | WGymnastics | | | | | | | | | | | | | | | | | | | | | | 6 | 5 | 6 | | 1 | | 2 | 8 | 5 | 2 | | 4 | X |
| Aerobic | WGymnastics | | | | | | | | | | | | | | | | | | | | | | 4 | 4 | 4 | | 2 | | | | 3 | 5 | 5 | 2 | |
| Handball (indoor) | IHF | | | | | | | | | | | | | | | | | | | | | | 2 | | 2 | | | | | | | 2 | | 2 | |
| Handball (beach) | IHF | | | | | | | | | | | | | | | | | | | | | | 2 | | 2 | | | | | | 1 | 1 | | | |
| Field hockey | FIH | | | | | | | | | | | | | | | | | | | | | | | | 2 | | | 2 | 2 | 2 | | | 2 | 2 | X |
| Indoor hockey | FIH | | | | | | | | | | | | | | | | | | | | | | | | | | | | | 2 | 2 | | 2 | 2 | X |
| Hockey5s | FIH | | | | | | | | | | | | | | | | | | | | | | | | | | | | | | | | | 2 | |
| Jet ski | UIM | | | | | | | | | | | | | | | | | | | | | | | | | | | | | | | | 6 | 6 | |
| Judo | IJF | | | | | | | | | | | | | | | | | | | | | | 16 | 8 | 16 | 18 | 16 | 18 | 12 | 6 | 16 | 13 | 13 | 12 | X |
| Ju-jitsu | JJIF | | | | | | | | | | | | | | | | | | | | | | | | | | | | | | 11 | 6 | 13 | 18 | |
| Kabaddi | IKF | | | | | | | | | | | | | | | | | | | | | | | | | | | | | | | | | 6 | X |
| Karate | WKF | | | | | | | | | | | | | | | | | | | | | | 19 | 18 | 18 | 17 | 16 | 17 | | 16 | 13 | 15 | 17 | 15 | X |
| Kenpō | IKF | | | | | | | | | | | | | | | | | | | | | | | | | | 16 | 18 | | | | | | | |
| Kickboxing | WAKO | | | | | | | | | | | | | | | | | | | | | | | | | | | | | | 8 | 12 | 17 | 8 | |
| Kun bokator | | | | | | | | | | | | | | | | | | | | | | | | | | | | | | | | | 21 | | |
| Kun khmer | | | | | | | | | | | | | | | | | | | | | | | | | | | | | | | | | 19 | | |
| Kurash | IKA | | | | | | | | | | | | | | | | | | | | | | | | | | | | | | 10 | 10 | | | |
| Lawn bowls | WBowls | | | | | | | | | | | | | | | | | | | | | | | | 6 | | | | | 8 | 6 | | | | X |
| Mixed martial arts | IMMAF | | | | | | | | | | | | | | | | | | | | | | | | | | | | | | | | | • | |
| Modern pentathlon | UIPM | | | | | | | | | | | | | | | | | | | | | | | | | | | | | | 6 | | | 6 | |
| Muay thai | IFMA | | | | | | | | | | | | | | | | | | | | | | | 7 | 11 | 13 | | 14 | | 5 | 9 | 11 | | 18 | X |
| Netball | WNetball | | | | | | | | | | | | | | | | | | | | | 1 | | | | | | | 1 | 1 | 1 | | | 1 | X |
| Obstacle race | FISO | | | | | | | | | | | | | | | | | | | | | | | | | | | | | | 6 | | 4 | | |
| Padel | FIPadel | | | | | | | | | | | | | | | | | | | | | | | | | | | | | | | | | | X |
| Paragliding | FAI | | | | | | | | | | | | | | | | | | | | | | | | | | 12 | | | | | | | • | |
| Paramotoring | FAI | | | | | | | | | | | | | | | | | | | | | | | | | | | | | | | | | • | |
| Pencak silat | IPSF | | | | | | | | | | | | | | | | | | | | | | 22 | 13 | 17 | 18 | 15 | 13 | 13 | 20 | 9 | 16 | 22 | 13 | X |
| Pétanque | FIPJP | | | | | | | | | | | | | | | | | | | | | | 6 | 4 | 9 | 11 | 6 | 11 | 10 | 7 | 4 | 8 | 11 | 11 | X |
| Polo | FIPolo | | | | | | | | | | | | | | | | | | | | | | | | 1 | | | | | 1 | 1 | | | 2 | X |
| Roller speed skating | WSkate | | | | | | | | | | | | | | | | | | | | | | | | | | 12 | | | | | | | | |
| Rowing | WRowing | | | | | | | | | | | | | | | | | | | | | | 8 | 9 | 11 | | 11 | 9 | 18 | | 6 | 16 | | 10 | |
| Rugby sevens | WRugby | | | | | | | | | | | | | | | | | | | | | | | | | | | | 2 | 2 | 2 | | | 2 | X |
| Rugby union | WRugby | | | | 1 | | | | 1 | 1 | | | | | | | | | | | | | | | 2 | | | | | | | | | | |
| Sailing | WSailing | | | | | | | | | | | | | | | | | | | | | | | 12 | 17 | | 9 | 13 | 20 | 14 | 11 | | 9 | 14 | X |
| Sambo | FIAS | | | | | | | | | | | | | | | | | | | | | | | | | | | | | | 7 | | | | |
| Sepak takraw | ISTAF | | | | | | | | | | | | | | | | | | | | | | 4 | 4 | 6 | 6 | 6 | 8 | 6 | 8 | 4 | 8 | 8 | 7 | X |
| Hoop | ISTAF | | | | | | | | | | | | | | | | | | | | | | 2 | 2 | 2 | 2 | | 2 | | | 2 | | 2 | 2 | |
| Chinlone | ISTAF | | | | | | | | | | | | | | | | | | | | | | | | | | | 8 | 4 | 4 | | | 11 | 2 | X |
| Shooting | ISSF | Y | Y | Y | Y | Y | Y | Y | Y | Y | Y | Y | Y | Y | Y | Y | Y | Y | Y | Y | Y | Y | 42 | 22 | 33 | 34 | 14 | 12 | 26 | 14 | 14 | 22 | | 30 | X |
| Shuttlecock | ISF | | | | | | | | | | | | | | | | | | | | | | 7 | | | 7 | | | | | | | | | |
| Skateboarding | WSkate | | | | | | | | | | | | | | | | | | | | | | | | | | | | | | 8 | | | 4 | |
| Soft tennis | ISTF | | | | | | | | | | | | | | | | | | | | | | | | | | 7 | | | | 3 | | 7 | | |
| Sport climbing | WClimbing | | | | | | | | | | | | | | | | | | | | | | | | | | 10 | | | | | | | 6 | |
| Squash | WSquash | | | | | | | | | | | | | | | | | | | | | | | 2 | 1 | | | | 5 | 9 | 5 | | | 4 | X |
| Surfing | ISA | | | | | | | | | | | | | | | | | | | | | | | | | | | | | | 4 | | | | |
| Table tennis | ITTF | 1 | 1 | 7 | 7 | 7 | 7 | 7 | 7 | 7 | 7 | 7 | 7 | 7 | 7 | 7 | 7 | Y | Y | Y | Y | Y | 7 | 7 | 7 | 7 | 5 | 4 | 7 | 7 | 4 | 7 | 7 | 7 | X |
| Taekwondo | WTaekwondo | | | | | | | | | | | | | | | | | | | | | | 16 | 16 | 16 | 21 | 21 | 21 | 15 | 16 | 22 | 19 | 24 | 20 | X |
| Tennis | World Tennis | Y | Y | Y | Y | Y | Y | Y | Y | Y | Y | Y | Y | Y | Y | Y | Y | Y | Y | Y | Y | Y | 7 | 7 | 7 | 7 | 7 | | 7 | 5 | 5 | 7 | 7 | 7 | X |
| Teqball | FITEQ | | | | | | | | | | | | | | | | | | | | | | | | | | | | | | | | • | 5 | X |
| Traditional boat race | IDBF | | | | | | | | | | | | | | | 4 | 4 | | | | | | 4 | 6 | 4 | | 10 | 17 | 8 | | 6 | | 13 | 8 | |
| Tug of war | TWIF | | | | | | | | | | | | | | | | | | | | | | | | | | | | | | | | | • | |
| Ultimate | WFDF | | | | | | | | | | | | | | | | | | | | | | | | | | | | | | | | | • | |
| Underwater hockey | CMAS | | | | | | | | | | | | | | | | | | | | | | | | | | | | | | 4 | | | | |
| Volleyball (indoor) | FIVB | 1 | 1 | 2 | 2 | 2 | 2 | 2 | 2 | 2 | 2 | 2 | 2 | 2 | 2 | 2 | 2 | | | | | | 2 | 2 | 2 | 2 | 2 | 2 | 2 | 2 | 2 | 2 | 2 | 2 | X |
| Volleyball (beach) | FIVB | | | | | | | | | | | | | | | | | | | | | | 2 | 2 | 2 | 2 | 2 | | | | 2 | 2 | 2 | 2 | |
| Waterskiing | IWaterskiWakeboardF | | | | | | | | | | | | | | Y | | | | | Y | | | | | | | 11 | | 11 | 11 | 5 | | | 4 | X |
| Weightlifting | IWeightliftingF | | | | | | | | | | | | | | | | | | | | | | 13 | 10 | 13 | 13 | 14 | 11 | | 5 | 10 | 14 | 14 | 14 | X |
| Ice hockey | IIHF | | | | | | | | | | | | | | | | | | | | | | | | | | | | | 1 | 1 | | | 2 | X |
| Figure skating | ISU | | | | | | | | | | | | | | | | | | | | | | | | | | | | | 2 | 2 | | | 2 | X |
| Short track speed skating | ISU | | | | | | | | | | | | | | | | | | | | | | | | | | | | | 6 | 6 | | | 7 | X |
| Woodball | IWoodballF | | | | | | | | | | | | | | | | | | | | | | | | | | | | | | | | | 6 | |
| Freestyle | UWW | | | | | | | | | | | | | | | | | | | | | | Y | 5 | 9 | 10 | 10 | 14 | | | | 18 | 20 | 8 | |
| Greco-roman | UWW | | | | | | | | | | | | | | | | | | | | | | Y | | 5 | 9 | 10 | 10 | | | 14 | | 10 | 4 | |
| Wushu | IWUF | | | | | | | | | | | | | | | | 14 | 14 | | 19 | | 20 | 28 | 22 | 14 | 21 | 20 | 23 | 20 | 17 | 16 | 21 | 22 | 24 | X |
| Vovinam | WVVF | | | | | | | | | | | | | | | | | | | | | | | | | | 14 | 18 | | | | 15 | 30 | | |
| Total events | | | | | | | | | | | | | | | | | | | | 440 | 233 | 391 | 442 | 443 | 475 | 372 | 543 | 461 | 402 | 404 | 529 | 523 | 580 | 574 | ??? |

=== Non-Olympic sports ===
The SEA Games features numerous non-Olympic sports in its programme, reflecting the popularity of some sports to the region, or as a means of introducing more obscure sports to the region and beyond. Some sports dropped from the Olympic programme may still be retained in the SEAG, although the games does not feature all of the Olympic sports, often in favour of the traditional ones.

| Sport | Introduced | Remarks |
|---|---|---|
| Billiards and snooker | 1987 (Indonesia) | Also in Asian Games, East Asian Games |
| Bodybuilding | 1987 (Indonesia) | Also in Asian Games |
| Bowling | 1975 (Thailand) | Also in Asian Games, Asian Youth Games, East Asian Games, Pan American Games, Special Olympics World Games, West Asian Games, World Games |
| Chess | 2003 (Vietnam) | Also in Asian Games |
| Dancesport | 2005 (Philippines) | Former Olympic sport (breaking only), also in Asian Games, East Asian Games, World Games |
| Esports | 2019 (Philippines) | Also in Asian Games |
| Finswimming | 2003 (Vietnam) | Also in World Games |
| Futsal | 2007 (Thailand) | Also in Asian Indoor and Martial Arts Games |
| Karate | 1987 (Indonesia) | Former Olympic sport, also in Asian Games, East Asian Games, South Asian Games, West Asian Games |
| Lawn bowls | 1999 (Brunei) | |
| Pétanque | 2001 (Malaysia) | Also in World Games |
| Polo | 2007 (Thailand) | Former Olympic sport |
| Rugby union | 1967 (Thailand) | Former Olympic sport, also in Asian Games, East Asian Games |
| Softball | 1979 (Indonesia) | Former Olympic sport, also in Asian Games, Pan American Games |
| Squash | 1991 (Philippines) | To be an Olympic sport, also in Asian Games, East Asian Games, South Asian Games, West Asian Games, Pan American Games |
| Teqball | 2023 (Cambodia) (demonstration); 2025 (Thailand) (full sport) | Also in Asian Youth Games |
| Traditional boat race | 1993 (Singapore) | Also in Asian Games, Asian Beach Games, East Asian Games |
| Waterskiing | 1987 (Indonesia) | Also in Asian Beach Games, Pan American Games |
| Woodball | 2025 (Thailand) | Also in Asian Beach Games |
| Wushu | 1991 (Philippines) | Also in Asian Games, East Asian Games, South Asian Games |

==== Traditional sports ====
| Sport | Common in | Introduced | Remarks |
|---|---|---|---|
| Arnis | Philippines | 1991 (Philippines) | Unique to SEAG |
| Chinlone | Myanmar | 2013 (Myanmar) | Unique to SEAG |
| Muay thai | Thailand | 2005 (Philippines) | Unique to SEAG |
| Pencak silat | Indonesia | 1987 (Indonesia) | Unique to SEAG |
| Sepak takraw | Throughout Southeast Asia | 1965 (Malaysia) | Also in Asian Games |
| Shuttlecock | Malaysia and Vietnam | 2003 (Vietnam) | Unique to SEAG |
| Vovinam | Vietnam | 2011 (Indonesia) | Unique to SEAG |
