= On course side =

Sailing term

On the course side is an expression used in sailboat racing to indicate that a boat was on the wrong side of the starting line when the starting signal was given. According to the Sailing Instructions valid for a specific racing event, being on the course side may entail an immediate disqualification, or it may allow to maneuver for correcting the start procedure.

The corresponding scoring abbreviation is OCS, whose technical meaning is as follows:

OCS Did not start; on the course side of the starting line at her starting signal and failed to start, or broke rule 30.1

— 2017-2020 Racing Rules of Sailing, p. 57, World Sailing (Southampton, UK, June 2016)
