= National Sailing Centre =

Sports venue in Singapore

Coordinates: 1.314851°N 103.961472°E

The National Sailing Centre (NSC) is located at the south-eastern tip of Singapore along the East Coast Park. It occupies 2.4 hectares of land.

== History ==
Opened in June 1999, the NSC is approximately 51 minutes away from the Youth Olympic Village via the highway.

Equipped with a large berthing area for boats, it also comprises an administration block, a multi-purpose sports hall, a cafeteria, a dormitory and an auditorium, the centre has been the first-choice location for regional and international competitions.

An ideal location for sailing competitions, the National Sailing Centre's strategic position makes full use of the south-west and north-east winds for year-round sailing. Since its opening, the National Sailing Centre has hosted many international and regional events. These include the World Byte Championships (2003), the World Hobie Tiger (2005), the ASEAN Optimist Championship (2006), the Asia Pacific Laser Championships (2006), and the Asian Optimist Championships (2007).

NSC's lease on its current premises ends in early 2024 and will move out of East Coast Park due to future land reclamation plans along the East Coast. It is planning to move to the site of Keppel Club by the planned Greater Southern Waterfront.

== 2010 Summer Youth Olympics ==
The National Sailing Centre will be used as a competition venue for sailing during the 2010 Summer Youth Olympics.
