= IYRU Women's Sailing World Championships =

The IYRU Women's Sailing World Championships was a World Championship organised by World Sailing from 1978 to 1992. It was done in order to increase female participation and ended with sailing hosting it first female only Olympic Event in 1992 using the 470.

== Events ==
=== One Person Dinghy ===
Year	Class	No. Boats	Gold	Silver	Bronze
1978	Laser	44	Lyndal Coxon (AUS)	Vanessa Dudley (AUS)	Heleen Wolters (NED)
1979	Laser	42	Marit Soderstrom (SWE)	Gunilla Berg (SWE)	Vanessa Dudley (AUS)
1980	Laser	42	Lynne Jewell (USA)	Kathryn Karlson (USA)	Virginia Perry (USA)
1981	Laser	40	Marit Soderstrom (SWE)	Ginny Perry (USA)	Elizabeth (Betsy) Gelenitis Alison (USA)
1982	Laser	35	Marit Soderstrom (SWE)	Betsy Alison (USA)	Carolle Spooner (CAN)
1983	Laser	28	Marit Soderstrom (SWE)	Lynne Jewell (USA)	Betsy Alison (USA)
1984	Laser	30	Lynne Jewell (USA)	Cathy Shaw (CAN)	Sussanne Madsen (DEN)
1985	Europe	41	Theresa Zabell (ESP)	Laurence Fremanteau (FRA)	Karin Andersson (SUI)
1986	Laser	17	Francesca Pavesi (ITA)	Karin Andersson (SUI)	Michelle Baker (NZL)
1987	Laser	27	Francesca Pavesi (ITA)	Cathy Shaw (CAN)	Michelle Baker (NZL)
1988	Laser	26	Francesca Pavesi (ITA)	Paolo Ferrario (ITA)	Courtenay Becker-Dey (USA)
1989	Europe	43	Alessandra Ingangi (ITA)	Linda Andersen (NOR)	Mette Gurvin (NOR)
1990	Europe	78	Dorte Jensen (DEN)	Mette Gurvin (NOR)	Martine Van Leeuwen (NED)
1991	Europe		Tine Moberg (NOR)	Arianna Bogatec (ITA)	Diane Burton (USA)
1992	Europe	55	Karianne Eikeland (NOR)	Helena Drodin (SUI)	Sabrina Landi (ITA)

=== Two Person Dinghy ===
Year	Class	No. Boats	Gold	Silver	Bronze
1978	420	33	Cathy Foster (GBR); Wendy Hilder (GBR)	Marie-Christine Hue (FRA); Claire Le Fur (FRA)	Genevieve Le Vaillant (FRA); Blandine Le Vaillant (FRA)
1979	420	24	Cathy Foster (GBR); Wendy Hilder (GBR)	Taylor (USA); Lewis (USA)	Mimie Currey (GBR); Jill Blake (GBR)
1980	420	30	Christina Mazzaferro (ITA); Emanuela Galeazzi (ITA)	Anna Bacchiega (ITA); Paola Bacchiega (ITA)	Marie-Christine Hue (FRA); Claire Le Fur (FRA)
1981	420	27	Christina Mazzaferro (ITA); Manuela Galeazzi (ITA)	Cathy Foster (GBR); Wendy Hilder (GBR)	Anna Bacchiega (ITA); Nives Monico (ITA)
1982	470	25	Anna Bacchiega (ITA); Nives Monico (ITA)	Christine Briand (FRA); Claire Fountaine (FRA)	Christina Mazzaferro (ITA); Emanuela Galeazzi (ITA)
1983	470	21	Christine Briand (FRA); Claire Fountaine (FRA)	Leslie Jean Egnot (NZL); Michelle Holland (NZL)	Anna Bacchiega (ITA); Nives Monico (ITA)
1984	470	18	Anna Bacchiega (ITA); Nives Monico (ITA)	Tonni Van De Vooren (NED); Henneke Stavenuiter (ITA)	Karen Johnson (CAN); Gail Johnson (CAN)
1985	470	31	Tonny Vermeulen (NED); Henneke Stavenuiter (ITA)	Karen Johnson (CAN); Gail Johnson (CAN)	Florence Le Brun (FRA); Sophie Berge (FRA)
1986	470	16	JJ Isler (Nee Fetter) (USA); Amy Wardell (USA)	Christine Briand (FRA); Claire Fountaine (FRA)	Karen Johnson (CAN); Gail Johnson (CAN)
1987	470	39	Florence Le Brun (FRA); Sophie Berge (FRA)	Susanne Theel (GDR); Silke Preuss (GDR)	Karen Johnson (CAN); Gail Johnson (CAN)
1988	470	21	Susan Taylor (USA); Cory Fischer (USA)	Lisa Niece (USA); Pat Raymond (USA)	JJ Isler (Nee Fetter) (USA); Amy Wardell (USA)
1989	420	24	Nuria Bover (ESP); Sylvia Summer (ESP)	Giorgia Gaudino (ITA); Sara Gaudino (ITA)	Stephanie Pornin (FRA): Rouan (FRA)
1990	470	27	Ines Bohn (GER); Sabine Rohatzsch (GER)	Wilma Kramer (NED); Henneke Stavenuiter (NED)	Florence Le Brun (FRA); Odile Barre (FRA)
1991	470		Larisa Moskalenko (RUS); UNKNOWN	Maria Quarra (ITA); UNKNOWN	JJ Isler (Nee Fetter) (USA); UNKNOWN
1992	470	28	Peggy Hardwiger (GER); Christina Pinnow (GER)	Yumiko Shige (JPN); Yurie Alicia Kinoshita (JPN)	Ines Bohn (GER); Sabine Rohatzsch (GER)

=== Windsurfing ===
Year	Class	Gold	Silver	Bronze
1982	Windglider	Santha Patel (NZL)	Veronique De Just (FRA)	Anne Gardner (USA)
1983	Mistral	Manuela Mascia (ITA)	Anick Graveline (CAN)	Karen Morch (CAN)
1984	Mistral	Lisa Neuburger (ISV)	Santha Patel (NZL)	Liesbeth Kort (NED)
1985	Mistral	Giuseppina Miglioranza (ITA)	Carol Ann Alie (CAN)	Barbara Kendall (NZL)
1986	Mistral	Penny Way (GBR)	Dong Yue (CHN)	Xiaodong Zhang (CHN)
1987	Mistral	Jessica Crisp (AUS)	Kathy Steele (USA)	Penny Way (GBR)
1988	Mistral	Carol Ann Alie (CAN)	Alessandra Sensini (ITA)	Penny Way (GBR)
1989	Div II	Li Ke (CHN)	Zhang Xiaodong (CHN)	Penny Way (GBR)
1990	Div II	Alessandra Sensini (ITA)	Lanee Butler (USA)	Marga Stalman (NED)
1991	Lechner	Penny Way (GBR)	Nathalie Le Lievre (FRA)	Jayne Fenner (USA)
1992	Lechner	R Swatland (USA)	M Wray (USA)	L Harnosky (USA)
