= Sailing at the 1988 Summer Olympics – Women's 470 =

Sailing at the Olympics

Women's 470 at the Games of the XXIII Olympiad
- 470
- Venue: Busan 부산 釜山
- Dates: 20–27 September
- Competitors: 42 from 21 nations
- Teams: 21

Medalists
1st place, gold medalist(s)		Allison Jolly; Lynne Jewell	United States
2nd place, silver medalist(s)		Marit Söderström; Birgitta Bengtsson	Sweden
3rd place, bronze medalist(s)		Larisa Moskalenko; Iryna Chunykhovska	Soviet Union

The Women's 470 was a sailing event on the Sailing at the 1988 Summer Olympics program in Pusan, South Korea. Seven races were scheduled. 42 sailors, on 21 boats, from 21 nations competed.

== Results ==
Rank	Helmsman (Country)	Crew	Race I		Race II		Race III		Race IV		Race V		Race VI		Race VII		Total Points	Total -1
Rank	Helmsman (Country)	Crew	Rank	Points	Rank	Points	Rank	Points	Rank	Points	Rank	Points	Rank	Points	Rank	Points	Total Points	Total -1
1st place, gold medalist(s)	Allison Jolly (USA)	Lynne Jewell	3	5.7	1	0.0	1	0.0	2	3.0	~~DSQ~~	~~28.0~~	2	3.0	9	15.0	54.7	26.7
2nd place, silver medalist(s)	Marit Söderström (SWE)	Birgitta Bengtsson	1	0.0	2	3.0	10	16.0	~~15~~	~~21.0~~	5	10.0	4	8.0	2	3.0	61.0	40.0
3rd place, bronze medalist(s)	Larisa Moskalenko (URS)	Iryna Chunykhovska	4	8.0	3	5.7	7	13.0	1	0.0	3	5.7	~~8~~	~~14.0~~	7	13.0	59.4	45.4
4	Bettina Lemström (FIN)	Annika Lemström	5	10.0	4	8.0	2	3.0	4	8.0	4	8.0	5	10.0	~~RET~~	~~28.0~~	75.0	47.0
5	Susanne Meyer (FRG)	Katrin Adlkofer	11	17.0	12	18.0	3	5.7	3	5.7	~~RET~~	~~28.0~~	1	0.0	5	10.0	84.4	56.4
6	Nicola Green (AUS)	Karyn Davis	2	3.0	~~14~~	~~20.0~~	14	20.0	10	16.0	2	3.0	9	15.0	1	0.0	77.0	57.0
7	Susanne Theel (GDR)	Silke Preuß	7	13.0	~~DSQ~~	~~28.0~~	13	19.0	8	14.0	1	0.0	3	5.7	3	5.7	85.4	57.4
8	Florence Le Brun (FRA)	Sophie Berge	9	15.0	15	21.0	5	10.0	~~18~~	~~24.0~~	10	16.0	6	11.7	4	8.0	105.7	81.7
9	Fiona Galloway (NZL)	Jan Shearer	~~16~~	~~22.0~~	5	10.0	11	17.0	13	19.0	7	13.0	7	13.0	6	11.7	105.7	83.7
10	Adelina González (ESP)	Patricia Guerra	8	14.0	6	11.7	4	8.0	5	10.0	~~RET~~	~~28.0~~	DSQ	28.0	13	19.0	118.7	90.7
11	Karen Johnson (CAN)	Gail Johnson	~~13~~	~~19.0~~	8	14.0	12	18.0	7	13.0	12	18.0	10	16.0	8	14.0	112.0	93.0
12	Anna Bacchiega (ITA)	Nives Monico	~~20~~	~~26.0~~	10	16.0	6	11.7	9	15.0	11	17.0	13	19.0	11	17.0	121.7	95.7
13	Henny Vegter (NED)	Marion Bultman	10	16.0	11	17.0	9	15.0	~~17~~	~~23.0~~	9	15.0	11	17.0	10	16.0	119.0	96.0
14	Mette Munch (DEN)	Lone Sørensen	6	11.7	7	13.0	8	14.0	11	17.0	8	14.0	~~RET~~	~~28.0~~	RET	28.0	125.7	97.7
15	Debbie Jarvis (GBR)	Sue Hay-Carr	~~DSQ~~	~~28.0~~	9	15.0	15	21.0	6	11.7	6	11.7	14	20.0	RET	28.0	135.4	107.4
16	Cinthia Knoth (BRA)	Márcia Pellicano	12	18.0	~~RET~~	~~28.0~~	16	22.0	14	20.0	RET	28.0	12	18.0	12	18.0	152.0	124.0
17	Keiko Nogami (JPN)	Aiko Saito	14	20.0	16	22.0	18	24.0	16	22.0	13	19.0	18	24.0	~~RET~~	~~28.0~~	159.0	131.0
18	Cathy MacAleavey (IRL)	Aisling Byrne-Bowman	15	21.0	13	19.0	19	25.0	12	18.0	RET	28.0	17	23.0	RET	28.0	162.0	134.0
19	Eliane Fierro (MEX)	Tania Fierro	18	24.0	17	23.0	17	23.0	19	25.0	14	20.0	16	22.0	~~RET~~	~~28.0~~	165.0	137.0
20	Chen Ruili (CHN)	Chen Xiumei	17	23.0	~~DSQ~~	~~28.0~~	20	26.0	DNF	28.0	RET	28.0	15	21.0	RET	28.0	182.0	154.0
21	Kim Hye-suk (KOR)	Han Jung-mi	19	25.0	~~RET~~	~~28.0~~	21	27.0	DNF	28.0	RET	28.0	19	25.0	RET	28.0	189.0	161.0

DNF = Did not finish, DSQ = Disqualified, PMS = Premature start
Crossed out results did not count for the total result.
= Male, = Female

=== Daily standings ===
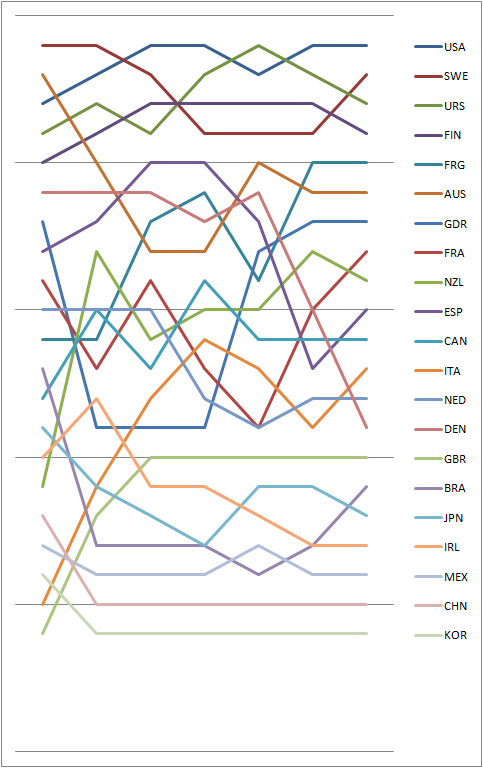
Graph showing the daily standings in the 470 during the 1988 Summer Olympics
