= Sailing at the 2008 Summer Olympics – Laser Radial =

Women's Laser Radial at the Games of the XXIX Olympiad
- Line drawing of the Laser Radial
- Venue: Qingdao International Sailing Centre
- Dates: First race: 12 August 2008; Last race: 19 August 2008
- Competitors: 28 from 28 nations

Medalists
1st place, gold medalist(s)		Anna Tunnicliffe	United States
2nd place, silver medalist(s)		Gintarė Scheidt	Lithuania
3rd place, bronze medalist(s)		Xu Lijia	China

The Laser Radial was a sailing event on the Sailing at the 2008 Summer Olympics program in Qingdao International Sailing Centre. Eleven races (last one a medal race) were scheduled. Only ten races were completed including the medal race due to lack of wind. 28 sailors, on 28 boats, from 28 nations competed. Ten boats qualified for the medal race.

== Race schedule ==
●	Practice race	●	Race on Yellow	●	Race on Green	●	Medal race on Yellow

Date	August																	
Date	7 Thu	8 Fri	9 Sat	10 Sun	11 Mon	12 Tue	13 Wed	14 Thu	15 Fri	16 Sat	17 Sun	18 Mon	19 Tue	20 Wed	21 Thu	22 Fri	23 Sat	24 Sun
Scheduled
Actual					PR	S1,2	S3	No wind	S4	S5	S6	S7,8,9	MR					

== Course areas and course configurations ==
For the Laser Radial course areas A (Yellow) and C (Green) were used. The location (36°1'26"’N, 120°26'52"E) points to the center of the 0.6nm radius Yellow course area and the location (36°2'44"N, 120°28'9"E) points to the center of the 0.75nm radius Green course area. The target time for the course was about 60 minutes for the races and 30 minutes for the medal race. The race management could choose from several course configurations.

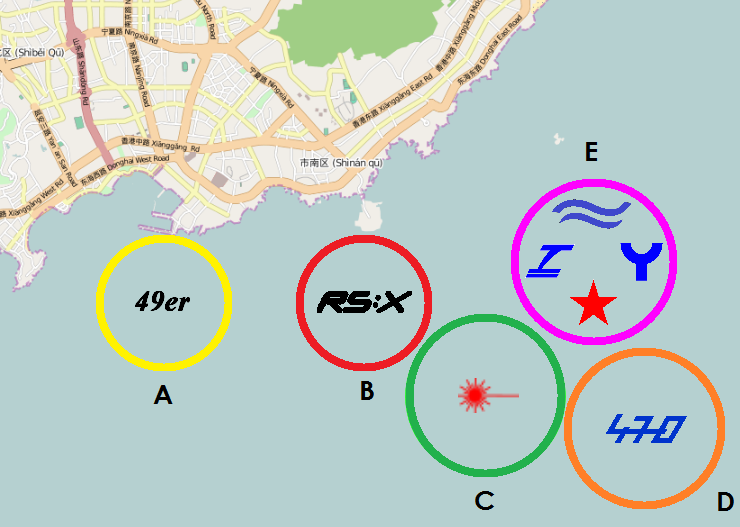
Course Areas

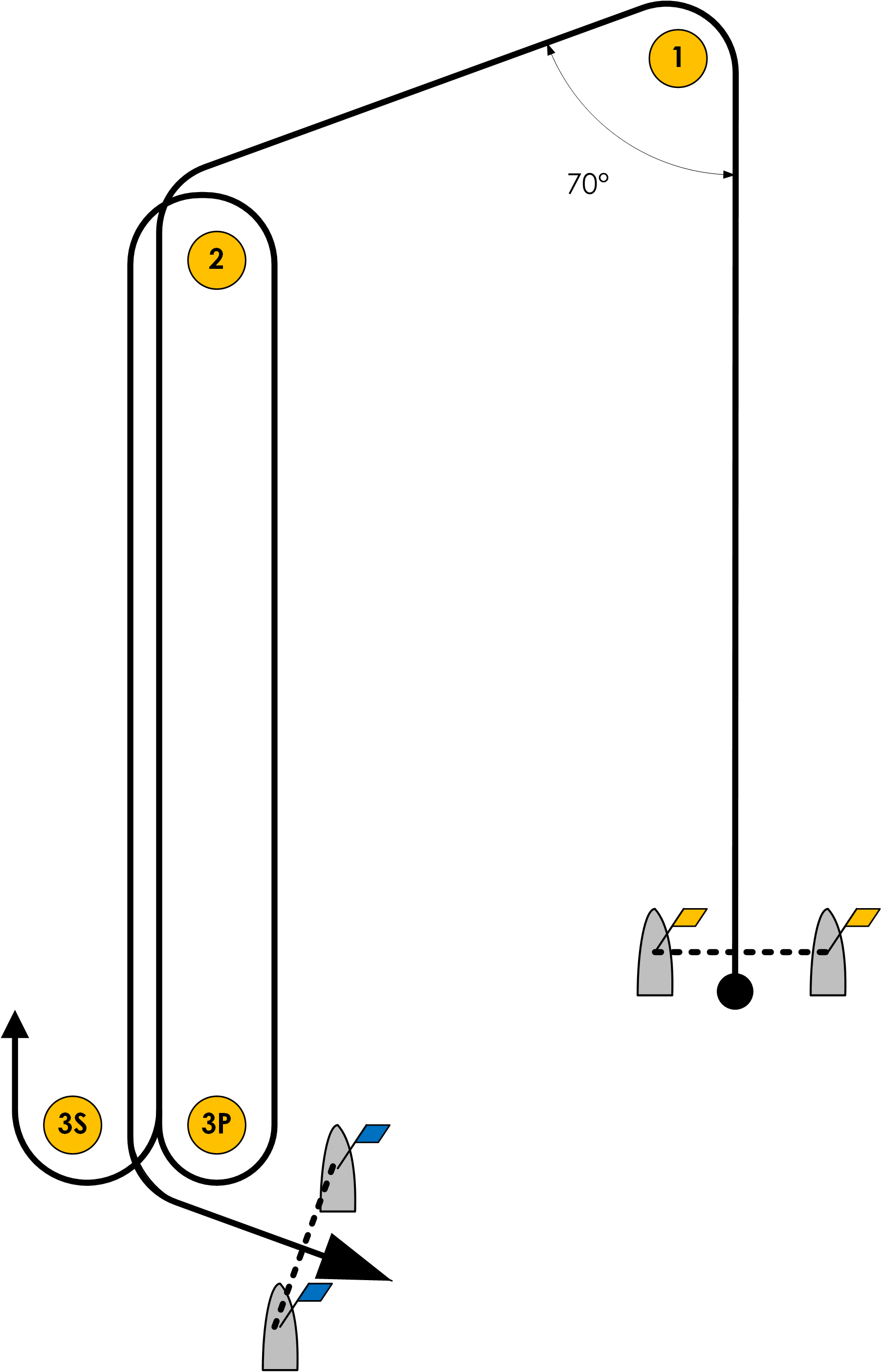
70° Trapezoid Outer Course (O)

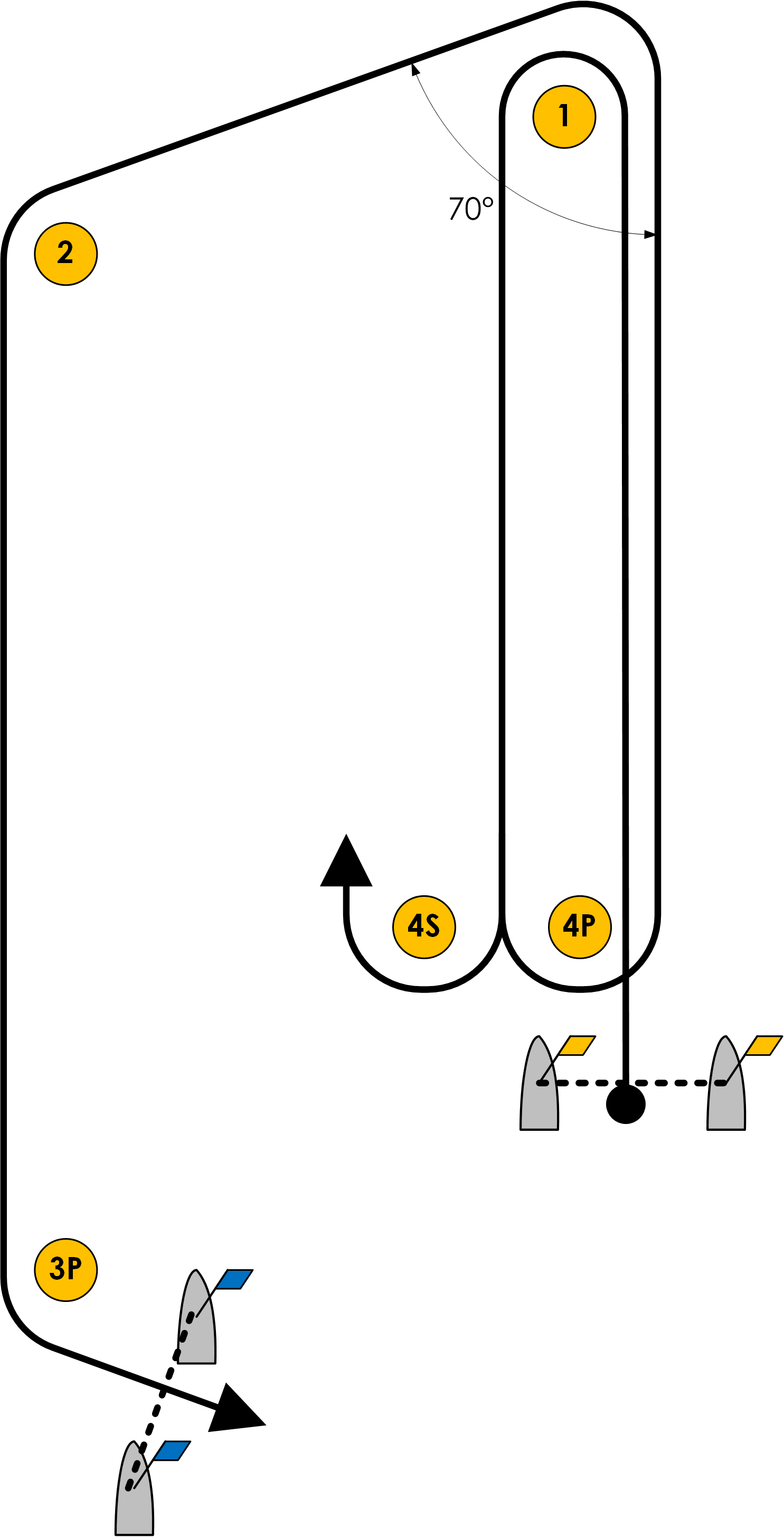
70° Trapezoid Inner Course (I)

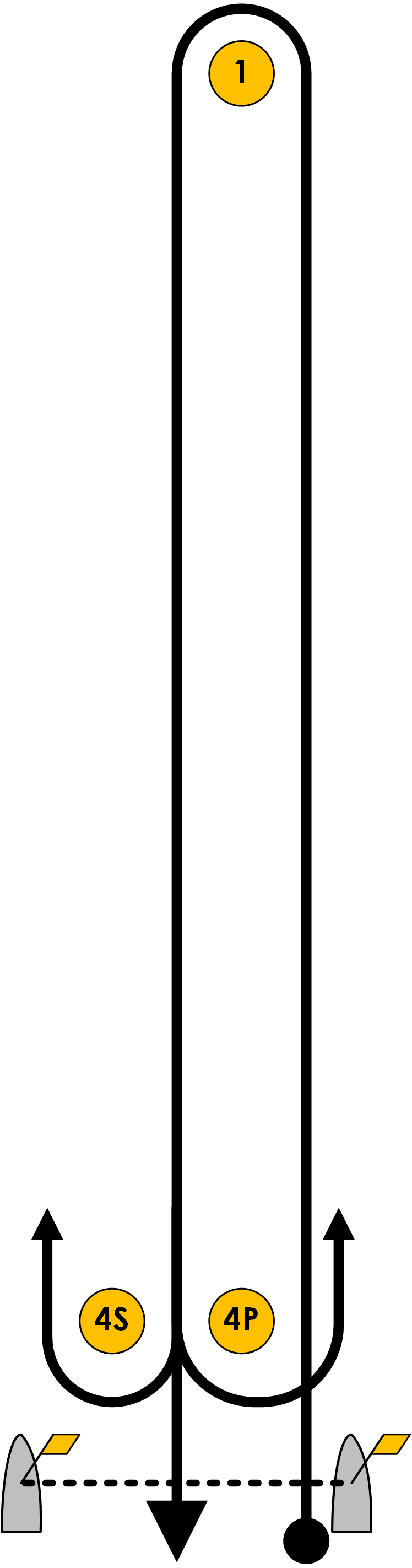
Windward - Leeward Course (W)

=== Outer courses ===
- O1: START – 1 – 2 – 3s/3p – 2 – 3p – FINISH
- O2: START – 1 – 2 – 3s/3p – 2 – 3s/3p – 2 – 3p – FINISH
- O3: START – 1 – 2 – 3s/3p – 2 – 3s/3p – 2 – 3s/3p – 2 – 3p – FINISH

=== Inner courses ===
- I1: START – 1 – 4s/4p – 1 – 2 – 3p – FINISH
- I2: START – 1 – 4s/4p – 1 – 4s/4p – 1 – 2 – 3p – FINISH
- I3: START – 1 – 4s/4p – 1 – 4s/4p – 1 – 4s/4p – 1 – 2 – 3p – FINISH

=== Windward-Leeward courses ===
- W2: START – 1 – 4s/4p – 1 – FINISH
- W3: START – 1 – 4s/4p – 1 – 4s/4p – 1 – FINISH
- W4: START – 1 – 4s/4p – 1 – 4s/4p – 1 – 4s/4p – 1 – FINISH

== Weather conditions ==
In the lead up to the Olympics many questioned the choice of Qingdao as a venue with very little predicted wind. During the races the wind was pretty light and quite unpredictable. Due to lack of wind (< 1.6 knots) one racing day had to be cancelled and the medal race needed to be postponed to the next day.

== Final results ==
Rank	Country	Helmsman	Race 1		Race 2		Race 3		Race 4		Race 5		Race 6		Race 7		Race 8		Race 9		Medalrace		Total	Total – discard
Rank	Country	Helmsman	Pos.	Pts.	Pos.	Pts.	Pos.	Pts.	Pos.	Pts.	Pos.	Pts.	Pos.	Pts.	Pos.	Pts.	Pos.	Pts.	Pos.	Pts.	Pos.	Pts.	Total	Total – discard
1st place, gold medalist(s)	United States	Anna Tunnicliffe	4	4.0	5	5.0	6	6.0	5	5.0	6	6.0	3	3.0	~~15~~	~~15.0~~	2	2.0	2	2.0	2	4.0	52.0	37.0
2nd place, silver medalist(s)	Lithuania	Gintarė Volungevičiūtė-Scheidt	3	3.0	13	13.0	8	8.0	1	1.0	1	1.0	4	4.0	~~21~~	~~21.0~~	6	6.0	4	4.0	1	2.0	63.0	42.0
3rd place, bronze medalist(s)	China	Xu Lijia	~~24~~	~~24.0~~	3	3.0	10	10.0	6	6.0	5	5.0	2	2.0	1	1.0	11	11.0	6	6.0	3	6.0	74.0	50.0
4	Australia	Sarah Blanck	6	6.0	11	11.0	7	7.0	~~19~~	~~19.0~~	4	4.0	12	12.0	8	8.0	1	1.0	5	5.0	4	8.0	81.0	62.0
5	France	Sarah Steyaert	11	11.0	1	1.0	21	21.0	3	3.0	~~BFD~~	~~29.0~~	1	1.0	3	3.0	10	10.0	11	11.0	8	16.0	106.0	77.0
6	Switzerland	Nathalie Brugger	13	13.0	6	6.0	12	12.0	12	12.0	~~22~~	~~22.0~~	10	10.0	10	10.0	8	8.0	9	9.0	5	10.0	112.0	90.0
7	New Zealand	Jo Aleh	~~22~~	~~22.0~~	4	4.0	2	2.0	2	2.0	2	2.0	14	14.0	14	14.0	14	14.0	20	20.0	9	18.0	112.0	90.0
8	Belgium	Evi Van Acker	1	1.0	10	10.0	16	16.0	10	10.0	12	12.0	6	6.0	12	12.0	4	4.0	~~18~~	~~18.0~~	10	20.0	109.0	91.0
9	Poland	Katarzyna Szotyńska	5	5.0	21	21.0	11	11.0	~~24~~	~~24.0~~	21	21.0	5	5.0	2	2.0	20	20.0	12	12.0	6	12.0	133.0	109.0
10	Great Britain	Penny Clark	2	2.0	22	22.0	1	1.0	22	22.0	3	3.0	17	17.0	18	18.0	~~23~~	~~23.0~~	13	13.0	7	14.0	135.0	112.0
11	Croatia	Mateja Petronijević	8	8.0	9	9.0	5	5.0	4	4.0	19	19.0	19	19.0	13	13.0	21	21.0	~~22~~	~~22.0~~	-	-	120.0	98.0
12	Argentina	Cecilia Carranza	15	15.0	8	8.0	9	9.0	20	20.0	8	8.0	15	15.0	6	6.0	~~DNC~~	~~29.0~~	23	23.0	-	-	133.0	104.0
13	Mexico	Tania Elías Calles	27	27.0	25	25.0	~~DNF~~	~~29.0~~	13	13.0	15	15.0	16	16.0	7	7.0	3	3.0	1	1.0	-	-	136.0	107.0
14	Sweden	Karin Söderström	19	19.0	19	19.0	4	4.0	25	25.0	9	9.0	18	18.0	~~OCS~~	~~29.0~~	5	5.0	8	8.0	-	-	136.0	107.0
15	Germany	Petra Niemann	20	20.0	20	20.0	19	19.0	8	8.0	~~BFD~~	~~29.0~~	7	7.0	4	4.0	17	17.0	14	14.0	-	-	138.0	109.0
16	Israel	Nufar Edelman	~~25~~	~~25.0~~	12	12.0	3	3.0	15	15.0	25	25.0	11	11.0	9	9.0	19	19.0	17	17.0	-	-	136.0	111.0
17	Canada	Lisa Ross	16	16.0	23	23.0	13	13.0	11	11.0	7	7.0	9	9.0	~~OCS~~	~~29.0~~	25	25.0	7	7.0	-	-	140.0	111.0
18	Greece	Efi Mantzaraki	14	14.0	18	18.0	14	14.0	18	18.0	16	16.0	8	8.0	5	5.0	22	22.0	~~24~~	~~24.0~~	-	-	139.0	115.0
19	Italy	Larissa Nevierov	17	17.0	15	15.0	22	22.0	9	9.0	11	11.0	13	13.0	16	16.0	~~24~~	~~24.0~~	21	21.0	-	-	148.0	124.0
20	Ireland	Ciara Peelo	23	23.0	17	17.0	15	15.0	7	7.0	13	13.0	24	24.0	~~25~~	~~25.0~~	18	18.0	10	10.0	-	-	152.0	127.0
21	Spain	Susana Romero	18	18.0	7	7.0	20	20.0	14	14.0	20	20.0	~~21~~	~~21.0~~	19	19.0	13	13.0	16	16.0	-	-	148.0	127.0
22	Finland	Tuula Tenkanen	10	10.0	16	16.0	~~25~~	~~25.0~~	21	21.0	17	17.0	20	20.0	20	20.0	9	9.0	15	15.0	-	-	153.0	128.0
23	Belarus	Tatiana Drozdovskaya	12	12.0	24	24.0	17	17.0	17	17.0	10	10.0	22	22.0	11	11.0	15	15.0	~~26~~	~~26.0~~	-	-	154.0	128.0
24	Paraguay	Florencia Cerutti	~~28~~	~~28.0~~	2	2.0	23	23.0	23	23.0	26	26.0	25	25.0	17	17.0	7	7.0	19	19.0	-	-	170.0	142.0
25	Singapore	Lo Man Yi	21	21.0	14	14.0	18	18.0	26	26.0	24	24.0	~~27~~	~~27.0~~	26	26.0	16	16.0	3	3.0	-	-	175.0	148.0
26	Peru	Paloma Schmidt	9	9.0	26	26.0	27	27.0	~~28~~	~~28.0~~	14	14.0	26	26.0	22	22.0	12	12.0	27	27.0	-	-	191.0	163.0
27	Russia	Anastasiya Chernova	7	7.0	~~28~~	~~28.0~~	26	26.0	16	16.0	18	18.0	23	23.0	24	24.0	26	26.0	28	28.0	-	-	196.0	168.0
28	Norway	Cathrine Gjerpen	26	26.0	27	27.0	24	24.0	27	27.0	23	23.0	~~28~~	~~28.0~~	23	23.0	27	27.0	25	25.0	-	-	230.0	202.0

Legend: – Qualified for next phase; BFD – Black flag disqualification; DNC – Did not come to the starting area; DNF – Did not finish; OCS – On the course side of the starting line;
Discard is crossed out and does not count for the overall result.

== Daily standings ==
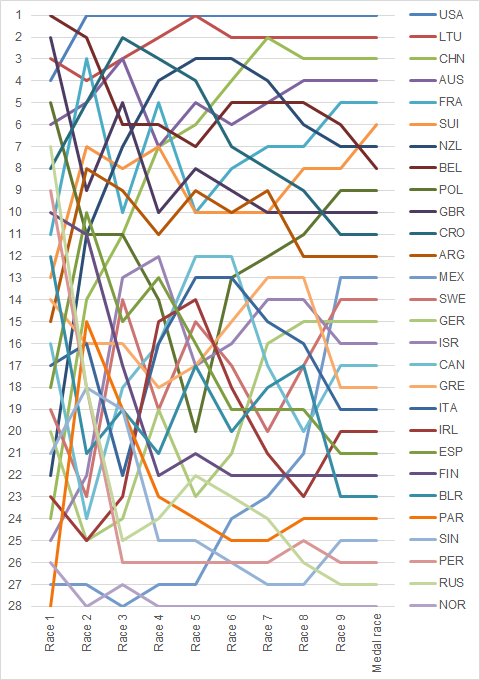
Graph showing the daily standings in the Laser Radial during the 2008 Summer Olympics
