= Lithuania at the 2008 Summer Olympics =

- IOC code: LTU
- NOC: Lithuanian National Olympic Committee
- Website: www.ltok.lt (in Lithuanian and English)

in Beijing
- Competitors: 71 in 16 sports
- Flag bearers: Šarūnas Jasikevičius (opening); Gintarė Volungevičiūtė (closing)
- Medals Ranked 56th: Gold 0 Silver 3 Bronze 2 Total 5

Summer Olympics appearances (overview)
- 1924; 1928; 1932–1988; 1992; 1996; 2000; 2004; 2008; 2012; 2016; 2020; 2024

Other related appearances
- Russian Empire (1908–1912); Soviet Union (1952–1988)

Lithuania was represented at the 2008 Summer Olympics in Beijing, China by the Lithuanian National Olympic Committee.

In total, 71 athletes including 44 men and 27 women represented Lithuania in 16 different sports including athletics, badminton, basketball, boxing, canoeing, cycling, gymnastics, judo, modern pentathlon, rowing, sailing, shooting, swimming, table tennis, weightlifting and wrestling.

Lithuania won a total five medals at the games including three silver and two bronze in athletics, sailing, modern pentathlon and wrestling.

== Competitors ==
In total, 71 athletes represented Lithuania at the 2008 Summer Olympics in Beijing, China across 16 different sports.

| Sport | Men | Women | Total |
|---|---|---|---|
| Athletics | 6 | 12 | 18 |
| Badminton | 1 | 1 | 2 |
| Basketball | 12 | 0 | 12 |
| Boxing | 3 | 0 | 3 |
| Canoeing | 4 | 0 | 4 |
| Cycling | 2 | 6 | 8 |
| Gymnastics | 0 | 1 | 0 |
| Judo | 1 | 0 | 1 |
| Modern pentathlon | 2 | 2 | 4 |
| Rowing | 1 | 0 | 1 |
| Sailing | 0 | 1 | 1 |
| Shooting | 0 | 1 | 1 |
| Swimming | 7 | 2 | 9 |
| Table tennis | 0 | 1 | 1 |
| Weightlifting | 1 | 0 | 1 |
| Wrestling | 4 | 0 | 4 |
| Total | 44 | 27 | 71 |

== Medalists ==
Lithuania won a total of five medals at the games after Gintarė Volungevičiūtė, Edvinas Krungolcas and Mindaugas Mizgaitis won silver in the sailing, modern pentathlon and wrestling respectively and Virgilijus Alekna and Andrejus Zadneprovskis won bronze in the athletics and modern pentathlon respectively.

| Medal | Name | Sport | Event |
|---|---|---|---|
| Silver | Gintarė Volungevičiūtė | Sailing | Women's Laser Radial |
| Silver | Edvinas Krungolcas | Modern pentathlon | Men's event |
| Silver | Mindaugas Mizgaitis | Wrestling | Men's Greco-Roman 120 kg |
| Bronze | Virgilijus Alekna | Athletics | Men's discus throw |
| Bronze | Andrejus Zadneprovskis | Modern pentathlon | Men's event |

== Athletics ==
In total, 18 Lithuanian athletes participated in the athletics events – Virgilijus Alekna in the men's discus throw, Eglė Balčiūnaitė in the women's 800 m, Živilė Balčiūnaitė and Rasa Drazdauskaitė in the women's marathon, Lina Grinčikaitė in the women's 100 m, Vitalij Kozlov in the men's 800 m, Sonata Milušauskaitė and Kristina Saltanovič in the women's 20 km walk, Zinaida Sendriūtė in the women's discus throw, Darius Škarnulis, Donatas Škarnulis and Tadas Šuškevičius in the men's 50 km walk, Austra Skujytė in the heptathlon, Inga Stasiulionytė in the women's javelin throw, Rasa Troup in the women's 3,000 m steeplechase, Karina Vnukova in the women's high jump and Marius Žiūkas in the men's 20 km walk.

Men
Track & road events

| Athlete | Event | Heat | | Semifinal | | Final | |
| Athlete | Event | Result | Rank | Result | Rank | Result | Rank |
|---|---|---|---|---|---|---|---|
| Vitalij Kozlov | 800 m | 1:48.96 | 6 | Did not advance | | | |
| Darius Škarnulis | 50 km walk | — | | | | DSQ | |
| Donatas Škarnulis | 50 km walk | — | | | | DNF | |
| Tadas Šuškevičius | 50 km walk | — | | | | 4:02:45 | 32 |
| Marius Žiūkas | 20 km walk | — | | | | 1:25.36 | 35 |

Field events

| Athlete | Event | Qualification | | Final | |
| Athlete | Event | Distance | Position | Distance | Position |
|---|---|---|---|---|---|
| Virgilijus Alekna | Discus throw | 65.84 | 2 Q | 67.79 | 3rd place, bronze medalist(s) |

Women
Track & road events

| Athlete | Event | Heat | | Quarterfinal | | Semifinal | | Final | |
| Athlete | Event | Result | Rank | Result | Rank | Result | Rank | Result | Rank |
|---|---|---|---|---|---|---|---|---|---|
| Eglė Balčiūnaitė | 800 m | 2:00.15 | 4 q | — | | 2:02.59 | 7 | Did not advance | |
| Živilė Balčiūnaitė | Marathon | — | | | | | | 2:29.33 | 12 |
| Rasa Drazdauskaitė | Marathon | — | | | | | | 2:35.09 | 37 |
| Lina Grinčikaitė | 100 m | 11.43 | 3 Q | 11.33 | 2 Q | 11.50 | 6 | Did not advance | |
| Sonata Milušauskaitė | 20 km walk | — | | | | | | 1:30:26 | 16 |
| Kristina Saltanovič | 20 km walk | — | | | | | | 1:31:03 | 19 |
| Rasa Troup | 3,000 m steeplechase | 9:30.21 NR | 8 | — | | | | Did not advance | |

Field events

| Athlete | Event | Qualification | | Final | |
| Athlete | Event | Distance | Position | Distance | Position |
|---|---|---|---|---|---|
| Zinaida Sendriūtė | Discus throw | 54.81 | 33 | Did not advance | |
| Inga Stasiulionytė | Javelin throw | 55.66 | 32 | Did not advance | |
| Karina Vnukova | High jump | 1.85 | 23 | Did not advance | |

Heptathlon
| Athlete | Event | 100H | HJ | SP | 200 m | LJ | JT | 800 m | Final | Rank |
|---|---|---|---|---|---|---|---|---|---|---|
| Austra Skujytė | Result | 14.46 | 1.77 | 17.02 | 25.40 | NM | DNS | — | DNF | |
| Austra Skujytė | Points | 914 | 941 | 997 | 850 | 0 | 0 | — | DNF | |
| Viktorija Žemaitytė | Result | 14.44 | 1.74 | 14.01 | 25.06 | NM | DNS | — | DNF | |
| Viktorija Žemaitytė | Points | 917 | 903 | 795 | 881 | 0 | 0 | — | DNF | |

== Badminton ==
In total, two Lithuanian athletes participated in the badminton events – Kęstutis Navickas in the men's singles and Akvilė Stapušaitytė in the women's singles.

| Athlete | Event | Round of 64 | Round of 32 | Round of 16 | Quarterfinal | Semifinal | Final / BM | |
| Athlete | Event | Opposition Score | Opposition Score | Opposition Score | Opposition Score | Opposition Score | Opposition Score | Rank |
|---|---|---|---|---|---|---|---|---|
| Kęstutis Navickas | Men's singles | Abián (ESP); W 23–21, 12–21, 21–9 | Pukhov (RUS); W 21–12, 21–17 | Lee C W (MAS); L 5–21, 7–21 | Did not advance | | | |
| Akvilė Stapušaitytė | Women's singles | Bye | Rasmussen (DEN); L 6–21, 8–21 | Did not advance | | | | |

== Basketball ==
In total, 12 Lithuanian athletes participated in the basketball events – Simas Jasaitis, Šarūnas Jasikevičius, Robertas Javtokas, Rimantas Kaukėnas, Linas Kleiza, Darjuš Lavrinovič, Kšyštof Lavrinovič, Mindaugas Lukauskis, Jonas Mačiulis, Marijonas Petravičius, Marius Prekevičius and Ramūnas Šiškauskas in the men's tournament.

Group play

| Pos | Team | Pld | W | L | PF | PA | PD | Pts | Qualification |
|---|---|---|---|---|---|---|---|---|---|
| 1 | Lithuania | 5 | 4 | 1 | 425 | 400 | +25 | 9 (Note: Head-to-head record: Lithuania 1–0 Argentina) | Quarterfinals |
| 2 | Argentina | 5 | 4 | 1 | 425 | 361 | +64 | 9 | Quarterfinals |
| 3 | Croatia | 5 | 3 | 2 | 399 | 380 | +19 | 8 (Note: Head-to-head record: Croatia 1–0 Australia) | Quarterfinals |
| 4 | Australia | 5 | 3 | 2 | 457 | 405 | +52 | 8 | Quarterfinals |
| 5 | Russia | 5 | 1 | 4 | 387 | 406 | −19 | 6 | |
| 6 | Iran | 5 | 0 | 5 | 323 | 464 | −141 | 5 | |

Source: FIBA archive
Rules for classification: 1) points; 2) head-to-head points; 3) head-to-head goal average; 4) head-to-head number of points scored.
Notes:

10 August 2008
16:45

Report

| Lithuania | 79–75 | Argentina |
Scoring by quarter: 14–11, 20–19, 17–15, 28–30
| Pts: Kleiza 13; Rebs: K. Lavrinovič 7 Asts: Jasikevičius 8 | | Pts: Ginobili 19; Rebs: Oberto 11; Asts: Oberto, Prigioni 3 |

Wukesong Indoor Stadium, Beijing
Attendance: 11,083
Referees: Nikolaos Zavlanos (GRE)

12 August 2008
09:00

Report

| Iran | 67–99 | Lithuania |
Scoring by quarter: 20–15, 14–31, 19–28, 14–25
| Pts: Haddadi 21; Rebs: Sahakian 12; Asts: Amini 4 | | Pts: Kleiza 22; Rebs: Kleiza 8 Asts: Jasikevičius, Lukauskis, Mačiulis 3 |

Wukesong Indoor Stadium, Beijing
Attendance: 11,083
Referees: Eddie Rush (USA)

14 August 2008
16:45

Report

| Lithuania | 86–79 | Russia |
Scoring by quarter: 23–24, 21–17, 25–21, 17–17
| Pts: Kaukėnas 20; Rebs: Kleiza 11; Asts: Jasikevičius 5 | | Pts: Holden 25; Rebs: Khriapa 9 Asts: Kirilenko 6 |

Wukesong Indoor Stadium, Beijing
Attendance: 11,083
Referees: Nikolaos Pitsilkas (GRE)

16 August 2008
14:30

Report

| Croatia | 73–86 | Lithuania |
Scoring by quarter: 15–13, 30–29, 17–16, 11–28
| Pts: Ukić 13; Rebs: Banić 7 Asts: Kus 3 | | Pts: Lukauskis 20; Rebs: K. Lavrinovič 7 Asts: Jasikevičius 6 |

Wukesong Indoor Stadium, Beijing
Attendance: 11,083
Referees: Nikolaos Zavlanos (GRE)

18 August 2008
11:15

Report

| Australia | 106–75 | Lithuania |
Scoring by quarter: 28–14, 27–15, 20–22, 31–24
| Pts: Bogut 23; Rebs: Mills 4 Asts: Anstey 4 | | Pts: K. Lavrinovič 14; Rebs: K. Lavrinovič 8 Asts: Jasikevičius 5 |

Wukesong Indoor Stadium, Beijing
Attendance: 11,083
Referees: Nikolaos Pitsilkas (GRE)

Quarterfinals

20 August 2008
16:45

Report

| Lithuania | 94–68 | China |
Scoring by quarter: 19–17, 22–13, 29–23, 24–15
Scoring by half: 41–30, 53–38
| Pts: Jasikevičius 23; Rebs: Kleiza 7 Asts: Jasikevičius 6 | | Pts: Yao 19; Rebs: Yi 9 Asts: Yao 3 |

Wukesong Indoor Stadium, Beijing
Attendance: 11,083
Referees: Nikolaos Pitsilkas (GRE)

Semifinals

22 August 2008
20:00

Report

| Spain | 91–86 | Lithuania |
Scoring by quarter: 21–19, 19–23, 22–24, 29–20
Scoring by half: 40–42, 51–44
| Pts: P Gasol 19; Rebs: Jiménez 7 Asts: Rubio 4 | | Pts: Jasaitis, Jasikevičius 19; Rebs: Jasaitis 8 Asts: Jasikevičius 6 |

Wukesong Indoor Stadium, Beijing
Attendance: 11,083
Referees: Nikolaos Pitsilkas (GRE)

Bronze medal game

24 August 2008
12:00

Report

| Lithuania | 75–87 | Argentina (bronze) |
Scoring by quarter: 21–24, 13–22, 15–22, 26–19
Scoring by half: 34–46, 41–41
| Pts: Šiškauskas 15; Rebs: Šiškauskas, K. Lavrinovič 6 Asts: Jasikevičius 3 | | Pts: Delfino 20; Rebs: Delfino 10; Asts: Prigioni 7 |

Wukesong Indoor Stadium, Beijing
Attendance: 11,083
Referees: Eddie Rush (USA)

== Boxing ==
In total, three Lithuanian athletes participated in the boxing events – Jaroslavas Jakšto in the super heavyweight category, Egidijus Kavaliauskas in the light welterweight category and Daugirdas Semiotas in the light heavyweight category.

| Athlete | Event | Round of 32 | Round of 16 | Quarterfinals | Semifinals | Final | |
| Athlete | Event | Opposition Result | Opposition Result | Opposition Result | Opposition Result | Opposition Result | Rank |
|---|---|---|---|---|---|---|---|
| Egidijus Kavaliauskas | Light welterweight | Vastine (FRA); L 2–13 | Did not advance | | | | |
| Daugirdas Semiotas | Light heavyweight | Shynaliyev (KAZ); L 3–11 | Did not advance | | | | |
| Jaroslavas Jakšto | Super heavyweight | — | Ohwarieme (NGR); W 11–1 | Price (GBR); L RSC | Did not advance | | |

== Canoeing ==
In total, four Lithuanian athletes participated in the canoeing events – Egidijus Balčiūnas and Alvydas Duonėla in the men's K-2 500 m and Tomas Gadeikis and Raimundas Labuckas in the men's C-2 500 m.

| Athlete | Event | Heats | | Semifinals | | Final | |
| Athlete | Event | Time | Rank | Time | Rank | Time | Rank |
|---|---|---|---|---|---|---|---|
| Tomas Gadeikis; Raimundas Labuckas | Men's C-2 500 m | 1:42.803 | 4 QS | 1:43.299 | 4 | Did not advance | |
| Egidijus Balčiūnas; Alvydas Duonėla | Men's K-2 500 m | 1:31.232 | 5 QS | 1:32.887 | 5 | Did not advance | |

Qualification Legend: QS = Qualify to semi-final; QF = Qualify directly to final

== Cycling ==
In total, eight Lithuanian athletes participated in the cycling events – Dainius Kairelis, Ignatas Konovalovas, Simona Krupeckaitė, Svetlana Pauliukaitė, Jolanta Polikevičiūtė, Edita Pučinskaitė, Vilija Sereikaitė and Modesta Vžesniauskaitė.

=== Road ===
| Athlete | Event | Time | Rank |
|---|---|---|---|
| Dainius Kairelis | Men's road race | 6:39:42 | 74 |
| Ignatas Konovalovas | Men's road race | 6:26:17 | 29 |
| Edita Pučinskaitė | Women's road race | 3:32:45 | 9 |
| Edita Pučinskaitė | Women's time trial | 38:55.37 | 23 |
| Jolanta Polikevičiūtė | Women's road race | 3:32:45 | 12 |
| Modesta Vžesniauskaitė | Women's road race | 3:33:17 | 27 |

=== Track ===
Sprint

| Athlete | Event | Qualification | | Round 1 | Repechage 1 | Quarterfinals | Semifinals | Final | |
| Athlete | Event | Time Speed (km/h) | Rank | Opposition Time Speed (km/h) | Opposition Time Speed (km/h) | Opposition Time Speed (km/h) | Opposition Time Speed (km/h) | Opposition Time Speed (km/h) | Rank |
|---|---|---|---|---|---|---|---|---|---|
| Simona Krupeckaitė | Women's sprint | 11.222; 64.159 | 5 | Reed (USA); L | Grankovskaya (RUS); Hijgenaar (NED); W 12.123; 59.391 | Pendleton (GBR); L, L | Did not advance | 5th-8th place Sanchez (FRA); Tsylinskaya (BLR); Reed (USA); L | 8 |

Pursuit

| Athlete | Event | Qualification | | Semifinals | | Finals | |
| Athlete | Event | Time | Rank | Opponent Results | Rank | Opponent Results | Rank |
|---|---|---|---|---|---|---|---|
| Svetlana Pauliukaitė | Women's individual pursuit | 3:45.691 | 12 | Did not advance | | | |
| Vilija Sereikaitė | Women's individual pursuit | 3:36.063 | 6 Q | Kalytovska (UKR); 3:36.808 | 6 | Did not advance | |

Omnium

| Athlete | Event | Points | Laps | Rank |
|---|---|---|---|---|
| Svetlana Pauliukaitė | Women's points race | 2 | 0 | 12 |

== Gymnastics ==
In total, one Lithuanian athlete participated in the gymnastic events – Jelena Zanevskaya in the women's artistic individual all-around.

| Athlete | Event | Qualification | | | | | | Final | | | | | |
| Athlete | Event | Apparatus | | | | Total | Rank | Apparatus | | | | Total | Rank |
| Athlete | Event | F | V | UB | BB | Total | Rank | F | V | UB | BB | Total | Rank |
|---|---|---|---|---|---|---|---|---|---|---|---|---|---|
| Jelena Zanevskaya | All-around | 13.350 | 13.875 | 13.350 | 13.375 | 53.950 | 54 | Did not advance | | | | | |

== Judo ==
In total, one Lithuanian athlete participated in the judo events – Albert Techov in the men's −60 kg category.

| Athlete | Event | Preliminary | Round of 32 | Round of 16 | Quarterfinals | Semifinals | Repechage 1 | Repechage 2 | Repechage 3 | Final / BM | |
| Athlete | Event | Opposition Result | Opposition Result | Opposition Result | Opposition Result | Opposition Result | Opposition Result | Opposition Result | Opposition Result | Opposition Result | Rank |
|---|---|---|---|---|---|---|---|---|---|---|---|
| Albert Techov | Men's −60 kg | Bye | Guédez (VEN); L 0000–1000 | Did not advance | | | | | | | |

== Modern pentathlon ==
In total, four Lithuanian athletes participated in the modern pentathlon events – Laura Asadauskaitė and Donata Rimšaitė in the women's competition and Edvinas Krungolcas and Andrejus Zadneprovskis in the men's competition.

| Athlete | Event | Shooting (10 m air pistol) | | | Fencing (épée one touch) | | | Swimming (200 m freestyle) | | | Riding (show jumping) | | | Running (3000 m) | | | Total points | Final rank |
| Athlete | Event | Points | Rank | MP Points | Results | Rank | MP points | Time | Rank | MP points | Penalties | Rank | MP points | Time | Rank | MP Points | Total points | Final rank |
|---|---|---|---|---|---|---|---|---|---|---|---|---|---|---|---|---|---|---|
| Edvinas Krungolcas | Men's | 185 | 7 | 1156 | 21–14 | 5 | 904 | 2:07.63 | 23 | 1272 | 56 | 4 | 1144 | 9:42.65 | 25 | 1072 | 5548 | 2nd place, silver medalist(s) |
| Andrejus Zadneprovskis | Men's | 182 | 17 | 1120 | 15–20 | 24 | 760 | 2:02.27 | 5 | 1336 | 28 | 2 | 1168 | 9:25.00 | 13 | 1140 | 5524 | 3rd place, bronze medalist(s) |
| Laura Asadauskaitė | Women's | 175 | 25 | 1036 | 12–23 | =31 | 688 | 2:21.76 | 22 | 1220 | 0 | 2 | 1200 | 10:18.95 | 4 | 1248 | 5392 | 15 |
| Donata Rimšaitė | Women's | 175 | 24 | 1036 | 17–18 | =18 | 808 | 2:20.57 | 21 | 1236 | 112 | 22 | 1088 | 10:13.76 | 3 | 1268 | 5436 | 13 |

== Rowing ==
In total, one Lithuanian athlete participated in the rowing events – Mindaugas Griškonis in the men's single sculls.

| Athlete | Event | Heats | | Quarterfinals | | Semifinals | | Final | |
| Athlete | Event | Time | Rank | Time | Rank | Time | Rank | Time | Rank |
|---|---|---|---|---|---|---|---|---|---|
| Mindaugas Griškonis | Single sculls | 7:28.05 | 2 QF | 6:54.47 | 2 SA/B | 7:20.32 | 6 FB | 7:09.323 | 8 |

Qualification Legend: FA=Final A (medal); FB=Final B (non-medal); FC=Final C (non-medal); FD=Final D (non-medal); FE=Final E (non-medal); FF=Final F (non-medal); SA/B=Semifinals A/B; SC/D=Semifinals C/D; SE/F=Semifinals E/F; QF=Quarterfinals; R=Repechage

== Sailing ==
In total, one Lithuanian athlete participated in the sailing events – Gintarė Volungevičiūtė in the women's laser radial.

| Athlete | Event | Race | | | | | | | | | | | Net points | Final rank |
| Athlete | Event | 1 | 2 | 3 | 4 | 5 | 6 | 7 | 8 | 9 | 10 | M* | Net points | Final rank |
|---|---|---|---|---|---|---|---|---|---|---|---|---|---|---|
| Gintarė Volungevičiūtė | Laser Radial | 3 | 13 | 8 | 1 | 1 | 4 | ~~21~~ | 6 | 4 | CAN | 2 | 42 | 2nd place, silver medalist(s) |

M = Medal race; EL = Eliminated – did not advance into the medal race; CAN = Race cancelled;

== Shooting ==
In total, one Lithuanian athlete participated in the shooting events – Daina Gudzinevičiūtė in the women's trap.

| Athlete | Event | Qualification | | Final | |
| Athlete | Event | Points | Rank | Points | Rank |
|---|---|---|---|---|---|
| Daina Gudzinevičiūtė | Trap | 69 | 5 Q | 86 | 5 |

== Swimming ==
In total, nine Lithuanian athletes participated in the swimming events – Saulius Binevičius, Edvinas Dautartas, Raminta Dvariškytė, Rolandas Gimbutis, Vytautas Janušaitis, Rugilė Mileišytė, Rimvydas Šalčius, Giedrius Titenis and Paulius Viktoravičius.

Men

| Athlete | Event | Heat | | Semifinal | | Final | |
| Athlete | Event | Time | Rank | Time | Rank | Time | Rank |
|---|---|---|---|---|---|---|---|
| Saulius Binevičius | 200 m freestyle | 1:51.80 | 47 | Did not advance | | | |
| Edvinas Dautartas | 200 m breaststroke | 2:13.11 | 31 | Did not advance | | | |
| Rolandas Gimbutis | 50 m freestyle | 24.36 | 58 | Did not advance | | | |
| Vytautas Janušaitis | 100 m backstroke | 55.65 | 32 | Did not advance | | | |
| Vytautas Janušaitis | 200 m individual medley | 1:59.63 | 11 Q | 2:00.76 | 15 | Did not advance | |
| Rimvydas Šalčius | 100 m butterfly | 52.90 | 34 | Did not advance | | | |
| Giedrius Titenis | 100 m breaststroke | 1:00.11 | 6 Q | 1:00.66 | 12 | Did not advance | |
| Paulius Viktoravičius | 100 m freestyle | 49.27 | 28 | Did not advance | | | |

Women

| Athlete | Event | Heat | | Semifinal | | Final | |
| Athlete | Event | Time | Rank | Time | Rank | Time | Rank |
|---|---|---|---|---|---|---|---|
| Raminta Dvariškytė | 200 m breaststroke | 2:33.32 | 35 | Did not advance | | | |
| Rugilė Mileišytė | 50 m freestyle | 26.19 | 39 | Did not advance | | | |

== Table tennis ==
In total, one Lithuanian athlete participated in the table tennis events – Rūta Paškauskienė in the women's singles.

| Athlete | Event | Preliminary round | Round 1 | Round 2 | Round 3 | Round 4 | Quarterfinals | Semifinals | Final / BM | |
| Athlete | Event | Opposition Result | Opposition Result | Opposition Result | Opposition Result | Opposition Result | Opposition Result | Opposition Result | Opposition Result | Rank |
|---|---|---|---|---|---|---|---|---|---|---|
| Rūta Paškauskienė | Women's singles | Nonaka (BRA); W 4–0 | Kim M-Y (PRK); W 4–3 | Tóth (HUN); L 3–4 | Did not advance | | | | | |

== Weightlifting ==
In total, one Lithuanian athlete participated in the weightlifting events – Ramūnas Vyšniauskas in the men's −105 kg category.

| Athlete | Event | Snatch | | Clean & Jerk | | Total | Rank |
| Athlete | Event | Result | Rank | Result | Rank | Total | Rank |
|---|---|---|---|---|---|---|---|
| Ramūnas Vyšniauskas | Men's −105 kg | 180 | 10 | ~~220~~ | DNF | 180 | DNF |

== Wrestling ==
In total, four Lithuanian athletes participated in the wrestling events – Mindaugas Ežerskis in the men's Greco-Roman −96 kg category, Aleksandr Kazakevič in the men's Greco-Roman −66 kg category, Mindaugas Mizgaitis in the men's Greco-Roman −120 kg category and Valdemaras Venckaitis in the men's Greco-Roman −74 kg category.

| Athlete | Event | Qualification | Round of 16 | Quarterfinal | Semifinal | Repechage 1 | Repechage 2 | Final / BM | |
| Athlete | Event | Opposition Result | Opposition Result | Opposition Result | Opposition Result | Opposition Result | Opposition Result | Opposition Result | Rank |
|---|---|---|---|---|---|---|---|---|---|
| Aleksandr Kazakevič | −66 kg | Siamionau (BLR); L 1–3 ^{PP} | Did not advance | | | | | | 15 |
| Valdemaras Venckaitis | −74 kg | Bye | Barrera (PER); L 1–3 ^{PP} | Did not advance | | | | | 14 |
| Mindaugas Ežerskis | −96 kg | Rezaei (IRI); W 3–1 ^{PP} | Khushtov (RUS); L 1–3 ^{PP} | Did not advance | | Bye | Mambetov (KAZ); L 1–3 ^{PP} | Did not advance | 7 |
| Mindaugas Mizgaitis | −120 kg | Bye | Kayaalp (TUR); W 3–1 ^{PP} | Baroev (RUS); L 1–3 ^{PP} | Did not advance | Bye | Hashemzadeh (IRI); W 3–1 ^{PP} | Szczepaniak (FRA); W 3–1 ^{PP} | 2nd place, silver medalist(s) |

- Mindaugas Mizgaitis originally finished third, but in November 2016, he was promoted to second place due to disqualification of Khasan Baroyev.

== See also ==
- Lithuania at the 2008 Summer Paralympics
