= Women's ILCA 6 World Championship =

Championship

The Women's ILCA 6 World Championship, until 2020 the Women's Laser Radial World Championship, has been held every year since 1980, organised by the International Sailing Federation. Laser Radial is an Olympic sailing class. The event was held together with the Men's Laser Radial World Championships between 1989 and 2010. In additional the Laser Radial was used the IYRU Women's Sailing World Championships before the class established its own title.

== Editions ==
Year	City	Country	Dates	Athletes	Nations	Notes
1980	Kingston	Canada				
1982	Sardinia	Italy				
1983	Gulfport	United States				
1985	Halmstad	Sweden				
1988	Falmouth	United Kingdom				
1989	Aarhus	Denmark		part of the 1989 Laser Radial World Championships		
1990	Newport	United States		part of the 1990 Laser Radial World Championships		
1991	Porto Carras	Greece		part of the 1991 Laser Radial World Championships		
1993	Takapuna	New Zealand		part of the 1993 Laser Radial World Championships		
1994	Wakayama	Japan		part of the 1994 Laser Radial World Championships		
1995	Tenerife	Spain		part of the 1995 Laser Radial World Championships		
1996	Simon's Town	South Africa	23–30 April	part of the 1996 Laser Radial World Championships		
1997	Mohammedia	Morocco	20–26 July	part of the 1997 Laser Radial World Championships		
1998	Medemblik	Netherlands	1–8 August	part of the 1998 Laser Radial World Championships		

Event			Host			Sailor			Ref.
Ed.	Date	Year	Host club	City	Country	Comp	Nat.	Cont.	Ref.
1	-	1999	Societe des Regates Rochelaises	La Rochelle, Charente-Maritime	France				
2	-	2000		Cesme, TURKEY	{{}}	31	17	5	
3	13-20 Jul	2001	Club Nautico Vilanova	Vilanova, Barcelona	Spain	56	25	6	
4	21-27 Jul	2002	Buffalo Canoe Club	Fort Erie, Ontario	Canada	37	10	5	
5	-	2003	Fraglia Vela Riva	Riva del Garda	Italy	50	16	5	
6	1-8 Apr	2004	Royal Queensland Yacht Squadron	Manly, Brisbane, Queensland	Australia	37	12	5	
X	2-9 Dec	2005	Iate Clube de Fortaleza	Fortaleza, Ceará	Brazil	76	32	5	
X	28Jul -4Aug	2006	California Yacht Club	Marina del Rey, California	United States	89	31	5	
X	27Jul -13Aug	2007	Clube Naval de Cascais	Cascais	Portugal	107	49	5	
X	15-20 Mar	2008	Takapuna Boating Club	Takapuna, Auckland	New Zealand	116	40	5	
X	25Jul -2Aug	2009		Karatsu	Japan	87	30	5	
X	6-14 Jul	2010	Largs Sailing Club	Largs	United Kingdom	114	39	5	
X	5-11 Dec	2011	Fremantle Sailing Club	Fremantle, Western Australia	Australia	102	51	6	
X	11-20 May	2012		Boltenhagen	Germany	133	53	5	
X	28Sep -7Oct	2013		Rizhao City	China	77	31	5	
X	8-21 Sep	2014	Real Club Maritimo de Santander	Santander, Cantabria	Spain	120	55	6	
X	17-26 Nov	2015	Al Musannah Sports City	Al Musannah	Oman	100	49	5	
X	12-20 Apr	2016	Vallarta Yacht Club	Nuevo Vallarta, Nayarit	Mexico	71	32	6	
X	19-26 Aug	2017	Royal Yacht Club Hollandia, Regatta Centre	Medemblik	Netherlands	99	40	5	
X	30Jul -12Aug	2018	Sailing Aarhus	Aarhus	Denmark	119	53	5	
X	17-24 Jul	2019		Sakaiminato-City	Japan	111	49	6	
X	21-28 Feb	2020	Sandringham Yacht Club	Sandringham, Victoria	Australia	105	40	5	
X	29Nov -6Dec	2021	Al Musannah Sports City	Al Musannah	Oman	63	31	4	
X	9-16 Oct	2022	Texas Corinthian Yacht Club	Kemah	United States	85	40	5	
X	8-20 Aug	2023	Seaport The Hague-Scheveningen	The Hague	Netherlands	110	53	6	
X	3-10 Jan	2024	Yacht Club Argentino - Mar del Plata	Mar del Plata	Argentina	101	45	6	
X	10-17 May	2025	Agios Kosmas Sailing Centre		Greece	99	40	5	
X	5-12 Sep	2026	Royal St George Yacht Club; National Yacht Club	Dún Laoghaire	Ireland	107	42	5	
X	15-23 Jan	2027	Iate Clube de Fortaleza	Fortaleza, Ceará	Brazil				

== Multiple medalists ==
#	Athlete	Country	Gold	Silver	Bronze	Total
1	Marit Bouwmeester	Netherlands	4	4	0	8
2	Anne-Marie Rindom	Denmark	4	0	3	7
3	Katarzyna Szotyńska	Poland	4	0	0	4
4	Jacqueline Ellis	Australia	2	1	1	4
4	Sari Multala	Finland	2	1	1	4
6	Ardis Bollweg	Netherlands	2	1	0	3
7	Emma Plasschaert	Belgium	2	0	2	4

== Medalists ==
year	Gold	Silver	Bronze	Ref.
1980 Kinston	Marit Söderström (SWE)	Lynne Jewell (USA)	Cheryl Smith (NZL)	
1982 Sardinia	Marion Steenhuis (NED)	Vittoria Masotto (ITA)	Francesca Pavesi (ITA)	
1983 Kingsport	Betsy Gelenitis (USA)	Lynne Jewell (USA)	Carolle Spooner (CAN)	
1985 Halmstad	Marit Söderström (SWE)	Lynne Jewell (USA)	Francesca Pavesi (ITA)	
1988 Fallmouth	Jacqueline Ellis (AUS)	Ardis Bollweg (NED)	Ann Keates (GBR)	
1989 Aarhus	Ardis Bollweg (NED)	Giselle Camet (USA)	Ulrika Antonsson (SWE)	
1990 Newport	Ardis Bollweg (NED)	Ulrika Antonsson (SWE)	Jacqueline Ellis (AUS)	
1991 Porto Carras	Maria Vlachou (GRE)	Carolijn Brouwer (NED)	Ourania Flabouri (GRE)	
1993 Takapuna	Carolijn Brouwer (NED)	Giselle Camet (USA)	Alexandra Verbeek (NED)	
1994 Wakayama	Melanie Dennison (AUS)	Jacqueline Ellis (AUS)	Tracey Tan (SIN)	
1995 Tenerife	Heidi Gordon (AUS)	Larissa Nevierov (ITA)	Roberta Hartley (GBR)	
1996 Simon's Town	Jacqueline Ellis (AUS)	Larissa Nevierov (ITA)	Kathryn McQueen (AUS)	
1997 Mohemedia	Sarah Blanck (AUS)	Helen Waite (GBR)	Anja Sahlberg (SWE)	
1998 Medemblik	Larissa Nevierov (ITA)	Carolijn Brouwer (NED)	Jeanette Dagson (SWE)	
1999 La Rochelle	Kelly Hand (CAN)	Jeanette Dagson (SWE)	Helene Viazzo (FRA)	
2000 Cesme	Katarzyna Szotyńska (POL)	Nicola Muller (GBR)	Jayne Singleton (GBR)	
2001 Vilanova	Katarzyna Szotyńska (POL)	Larissa Nevierov (ITA)	Sara Lane Wright (BER)	
2002 Buffalo	Katarzyna Szotyńska (POL)	Miranda Powrie (NZL)	Ciara Peelo (IRL)	
2003 Lake Garda	Katarzyna Szotyńska (POL)	Krystal Weir (AUS)	Jeanette Dagson (SWE)	
2004 Manly	Krystal Weir (AUS)	Christine Bridge (AUS)	Cecilia Carranza (ARG)	
2005 Fortaleza	Paige Railey (USA)	Sophie de Turckheim (FRA)	Anna Tunnicliffe (USA)	
2006 Los Angeles	Xu Lijia (CHN)	Petra Niemann (GER)	Tania Calles (MEX)	
2007 Cascais	Tatiana Drozdovskaya (BLR)	Sari Multala (FIN)	Petra Niemann (GER)	
2008 Auckland	Sarah Steyaert (FRA)	Xu Lijia (CHN)	Andrea Brewster (GBR)	
2009 Karatsu	Sari Multala (FIN)	Sophie de Turckheim (FRA)	Anna Tunnicliffe (USA)	
2010 Largs	Sari Multala (FIN)	Marit Bouwmeester (NED)	Paige Railey (USA)	
2011 Perth	Marit Bouwmeester (NED)	Evi Van Acker (BEL)	Paige Railey (USA)	
2012 Boltenhagen	Gintarė Scheidt (LTU)	Xu Lijia (CHN)	Sari Multala (FIN)	
2013 Rizhao	Tina Mihelić (CRO)	Tuula Tenkanen (FIN)	Paige Railey (USA)	
2014 Santander	Marit Bouwmeester (NED)	Josefin Olsson (SWE)	Evi Van Acker (BEL)	
2015 Al Mussanah	Anne-Marie Rindom (DEN)	Marit Bouwmeester (NED)	Evi Van Acker (BEL)	
2016 Nayarit	Alison Young (GBR)	Paige Railey (USA)	Anne-Marie Rindom (DEN)	
2017 Medemblik	Marit Bouwmeester (NED)	Evi Van Acker (BEL)	Manami Doi (JPN)	
2018 Aarhus	Emma Plasschaert (BEL)	Marit Bouwmeester (NED)	Anne-Marie Rindom (DEN)	
2019 Sakaiminato	Anne-Marie Rindom (DEN)	Marit Bouwmeester (NED)	Alison Young (GBR)	
2020 Melbourne	Marit Bouwmeester (NED)	Maxime Jonker (NED)	Line Flem Høst (NOR)	
2021 Al Mussanah	Emma Plasschaert (BEL)	Agata Barwińska (POL)	Viktorija Andrulytė (LTU)	
2022 Kemah	Anne-Marie Rindom (DEN)	Maud Jayet (SUI)	Emma Plasschaert (BEL)	
2023 The Hague	Mária Érdi (HUN)	Maud Jayet (SUI)	Anne-Marie Rindom (DEN)	
2024 Mar del Plata	Anne-Marie Rindom (DEN)	Charlotte Rose (USA)	Emma Plasschaert (BEL)	
2025 Qingdao	Louise Cervera (FRA)	Agata Barwińska (POL)	Eve McMahon (IRL)	
2026 Dún Laoghaire	Charlotte Rose (USA)	Emma Plasschaert (BEL)	Anna Munch (DEN)	

== See also - Class Events ==
- ILCA Main Worlds
  - Men's ILCA 6 World Championship
  - Women's ILCA 6 World Championship
  - Open ILCA 7 World Championship No Longer Held
  - Male ILCA 7 World Championship
- ILCA Age Related Worlds
  - Male Under 18 ILCA 4 World Championships
  - Female Under 18 ILCA 4 World Championships
  - Open Youth ILCA 6 World Championships No Longer Held
  - Male Youth ILCA 6 World Championships
  - Female Youth ILCA 6 World Championships
  - Female Under 21 ILCA 6 World Championships
  - Male Under 21 ILCA 7 World Championships
  - Open Over 30,45,55,65,75 ILCA Masters World Championships
- None Class Worlds
  - Youth Sailing World Championships
  - World Sailing Inclusion Championships
