= Xu Lijia =

Chinese sailor

Personal information
- Native name: 徐莉佳
- Nickname: Lily
- Nationality: Chinese
- Born: 30 August 1987 (age 38) Shanghai, China
- Education: Shanghai Jiao Tong University
- Height: 1.76 m (5 ft 9 in)
- Weight: 60 kg (132 lb)

Sport
- Country: China
- Sport: Sailing
- Event: Laser Radial
- Coached by: Liu Xiaoma (刘小马); Jon Emmett
Medal record
Olympic Games
Gold medal – first place	2012 London	Laser Radial
Bronze medal – third place	2008 Beijing	Laser Radial
World Championships
Gold medal – first place	2006 Los Angeles	Laser Radial
Silver medal – second place	2008 Auckland	Laser Radial
Silver medal – second place	2012 Boltenhagen	Laser Radial
- Updated on 13 August 2012

Xu Lijia (Chinese: 徐莉佳; pinyin: Xú Lìjiā; born 30 August 1987 in Shanghai) is a Chinese sailboat racer who won a bronze medal in women's Laser Radial class at the 2008 Summer Olympics and a gold medal in the same event at the 2012 Summer Olympics, where she was the flag bearer for China at the closing ceremony.

== Early life and career ==
Xu Lijia was born nearly deaf in one ear and nearly blind in one eye. She started swimming at age four and attended a sports school in the Changning District of Shanghai. When she was ten Xu was chosen by coach Zhang Jing to train for sailing.

Just a year after she started sailing, Xu Lijia won the 1998 Chinese National Championships held in Hong Kong.

In 1999, when she was twelve, Xu Lijia narrowly escaped death in a sudden storm while training on the open sea off the coast of Fujian Province with her coach and teammates. Wind speeds reached 20 meters per second (45 mph), resulting in 17-meter (56 ft) high waves, capsizing their boats. They were stranded at sea for more than two hours before managing to return to the base.

== Optimist and Europe classes ==
Xu Lijia began her international career aged 11 in the Optimist class in the 1998 Asian Championships, winning her first international gold medal in the 1999 Asian Championships. She then won the gold medals in the 2001 and 2002 World Championships, and the 2002 Asian Games, all in the Optimist class.

After she reached 15, in 2003 Xu progressed to the Europe class (then an Olympic class) according to International Sailing Federation (ISAF) rules. She switched to coach Liu Xiaoma, the husband of her old coach Zhang Jing.

== Tumor ==
During a routine physical examination before the 2004 Summer Olympics, doctors found a giant-cell tumor of bone near Xu Lijia's left knee. She initially hoped to postpone the tumor-removal surgery until after the Olympics, but doctors warned that the tumor could spread within months which would necessitate amputation of the leg. Xu underwent the surgery and missed the Athens Olympics.

== Laser Radial class ==
In 2005 Xu began racing Laser Radial class dinghies after the ISAF decided to replace the Europe class with Laser Radial in the women's sailing competition of the Olympics. The next year she won gold medals at the 2006 World Championships in Los Angeles and the 2006 Asian Games in Doha.

In March 2008 Xu Lijia won a silver medal at the World Championships in Auckland, New Zealand. In August she won her first Olympic medal, a bronze at the Qingdao regatta of the 2008 Summer Olympics, behind American sailor Anna Tunnicliffe and Gintare Volungeviciute of Lithuania.

After winning a gold medal at the 2009 National Games of China, Xu took a long break from the sport in order to recover from her back injuries and to commence her studies at Shanghai Jiao Tong University, majoring in Business Management. She resumed training in May 2011 and won a silver medal in May 2012 at the World Championships held in Boltenhagen, Germany.

== 2012 Summer Olympics ==
On 6 August 2012, Xu Lijia won the gold medal in the women's Laser Radial race at the 2012 Summer Olympics, beating Marit Bouwmeester of the Netherlands and Evi Van Acker of Belgium. It was China's second ever Olympic gold in sailing.

Partly because of her story of overcoming multiple adversities to become an Olympic champion, Xu was chosen over many better known athletes to be China's flag bearer at the closing ceremony of the London Olympics.

== Major wins ==
- 1998 Chinese Championships – 1st Optimist class
- 1999 Asian Championships – 1st Optimist class
- 2001 World Championships – 1st Optimist class
- 2002 World Championships – 1st Optimist class
- 2002 Asian Games – 1st Optimist class
- 2005 Chinese National Games – 2nd Europe class
- 2006 World Championships – 1st Laser Radial class
- 2006 Asian Games – 1st Laser Radial class
- 2008 World Championships – 2nd Laser Radial class
- 2008 Olympics – 3rd Laser Radial class
- 2009 National Games of China – 1st Laser Radial class
- 2012 World Championships – 2nd Laser Radial class
- 2012 Olympics - 1st Laser Radial class

Olympic Games
Preceded by Zhang Ning	Flagbearer for China at the Olympics closing ceremony London 2012	Succeeded by Ding Ning
