= 2021 ILCA 6 World Championships =

Sailing competition

2021 World Championships
- Location: Al-Musannah, Oman
- Dates: 29 November – 6 December

The 2021 Laser Radial World Championships were held from 29 November to 6 December 2021 in Al-Musannah, Oman.

== Medal summary ==
Event	Gold	Silver	Bronze
Men details	Nik Pletikos (SLO)	Al Muatasem Al Farsi (OMA)	Abdul Malik Al Hinai (OMA)
Women details Archived 2021-12-06 at the Wayback Machine	Emma Plasschaert (BEL)	Agata Barwińska (POL)	Viktorija Andrulytė (LTU)
