= Keiko Nogami =

Keiko Nogami may refer to:

- Keiko Nogami (runner) (野上 恵子, born 1985), Japanese long-distance runner
- Keiko Nogami (sailor) (野上 敬子, born 1947), Japanese sailor
