= Katarzyna Szotyńska =

Polish sailor

Personal information
- Nationality: Poland
- Born: 12 August 1980 (age 45) Warsaw, Poland
- Height: 1.68 m (5 ft 6 in)
- Weight: 68 kg (150 lb)

Sailing career
- Sport: Sailing
- Club: AZS UW Warsaw
- Coached by: Bartłomiej Szotyński
- Class: Dinghy
Medal record
Women's sailing
Representing Poland
World Championships
| Gold medal – first place | 2000 Ceşme | Laser Radial |
| Gold medal – first place | 2001 Vilanova | Laser Radial |
| Gold medal – first place | 2002 Buffalo | Laser Radial |
| Gold medal – first place | 2003 Lake Garda | Laser Radial |
Summer Universiade
| Gold medal – first place | 2005 İzmir | Laser Radial |

Katarzyna Szotyńska (born 12 August 1980), also known as Katarzyna Deberny, is a Polish former sailor who specialized in the Laser Radial class. She represented her country Poland at the 2008 Summer Olympics and came closest to the medal haul in the final race of her signature fleet, finishing in ninth place. Outside her Olympic career, Szotyńska collected a total of five gold medals in a major international regatta, spanning four editions of the World Championships (2000 to 2003) and the 2005 Summer Universiade in İzmir, Turkey. A senior member of the sailing roster at the University of Warsaw's sport academy (Polish: AZS Uniwersytet Warszawski), Szotyńska trained most of her competitive sporting career under the tutelage of her personal coach and brother Bartłomiej.

Szotyńska competed for the Polish sailing squad in the inaugural Laser Radial class at the 2008 Summer Olympics in Beijing. Building up to her maiden Games, she came closest to the podium finish in fourth place to secure one of the nineteen quota places offered and eventually, to top the country's Laser Radial spot at the 2007 ISAF Worlds in Cascais, Portugal. Entering the final race with a triad of top-five marks over the past ten legs, Szotyńska steered her way to touch the line in the ninth position with 109 net points. Furthermore, Szotyńska's overall score spared her from the back of the fleet by a slim three-point edge over Great Britain's Penny Clark.
