= Emma Plasschaert =

Belgian sailor (born 1993)

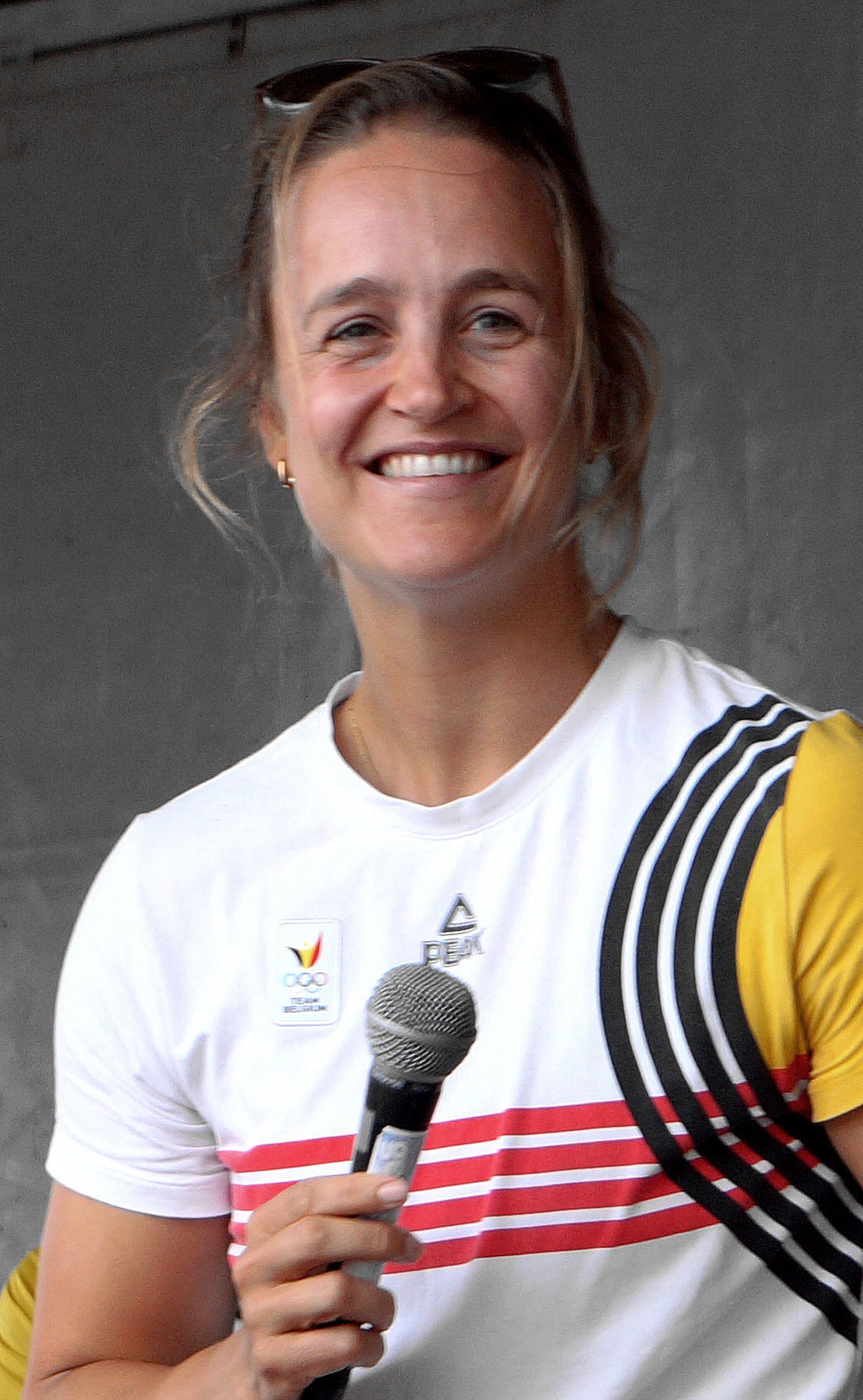

Personal information
- Nationality: Belgian
- Born: 1 November 1993 (age 32) Ostend, Belgium

Sailing career
- Sport: Sailing
- Class: ILCA 6
Medal record
Representing Belgium
World Championships
Gold medal – first place	2018 Aarhus	Laser Radial
Gold medal – first place	2021 Al-Mussanah	Laser Radial
Bronze medal – third place	2022 Trinity Bay	Laser Radial
Bronze medal – third place	2024 Mar del Plata	Laser Radial

Emma Plasschaert (born 1 November 1993) is a Belgian sailor. She is a two-time World Champion in the Laser Radial class (2018 and 2021). She ended fourth in that class at the 2020 Summer Olympics.

== Career ==
Plasschaert was born in Ostend, the largest city on the Belgian coast. She started her career in the small Optimist class, and after five years switched to the Europe class. She then switched to the Laser Radial class in 2010, and became part of the team around Evi Van Acker, who would win the bronze medal the 2012 Olympics. Plasschaert got her first top ten finishes at the World Championships in 2013 and 2014.

In August 2018, Plasschaert became world champion in the Laser Radial class, beating 2016 Olympic gold medalist Marit Bouwmeester. Three years later she won a second world title, also finishing fourth in the Tokyo 2020 Olympics. She married Australian sailor Matthew Wearn in 2023, before she participated in her second Olympics the following year.

== Awards ==
- 2011: Young Sailor of the Year award from Belgian Sailing
- 2013: Female Sailor of the Year award from Belgian Sailing
- 2018: Female Sailor of the Year award from Belgian Sailing
- 2019: Female Sailor of the Year award from Belgian Sailing
