= Chen Ruili =

Chinese sailor (born 1968)

Personal information
- Nationality: Chinese
- Born: 23 August 1968 (age 57)

Sport
- Sport: Sailing

Chen Ruili (born 23 August 1968) is a Chinese sailor. She competed in the women's 470 event at the 1988 Summer Olympics.
