= Han Jeong-mi =

South Korean sailor (born 1968)

Personal information
- Nationality: South Korean
- Born: 5 June 1968 (age 56)
- Height: 165 cm (5 ft 5 in)
- Weight: 64 kg (141 lb)

Sport
- Sport: Sailing

Han Jeong-mi (Korean: 한정미, also known as Han Jung-mi, born 5 June 1968) is a South Korean sailor. She competed in the women's 470 event at the 1988 Summer Olympics.
