= Louise Cervera =

French sailor

Personal information
- Nationality: French
- Born: 14 April 1998 (age 28) Grasse, France

Sailing career
- Sport: Sailing
- Class: Laser Radial
Medal record
Sailing
Gold medal – first place	2025	World Championships
Bronze medal – third place	2024	ILCA 6 European Championships

Louise Cervera (born 14 April 1998) is a French competitive sailor who competes in the ILCA 6 (Laser Radial) class. She is a world champion and European bronze medalist in the discipline, and represented France at the 2024 Summer Olympics.

== Career ==
She competed at the 2014 Summer Youth Olympics in the Byte CII class, finishing 15th.

At the 2024 Summer Olympics in Paris, Cervera competed in the ILCA 6 event and finished 10th overall.

Cervera won the bronze medal at the ILCA 6 European Championships and the gold medal at the 2025 Women's ILCA 6 World Championship.
