= Adelina González =

Spanish sailor (born 1964)

Personal information
- Full name: Adelina González Muñoz
- Born: 6 August 1964 (age 61) Las Palmas, Spain

Sport
- Country: Spain
- Sport: Sailing

Adelina González Muñoz (Note: In this Spanish name, the first or paternal surname is González and the second or maternal family name is Muñoz.) (born 6 August 1964) is a former Spanish female sailor. She competed at the 1988 Summer Olympics representing Spain in the Women's 470 event.
