= Florencia Cerutti =

Argentinian sailor

Personal information
- Full name: Florencia Cerutti Bogado
- Nationality: Paraguay
- Born: 12 September 1982 (age 43)
- Height: 1.62 m (5 ft 4 in)
- Weight: 69 kg (152 lb)

Sailing career
- Sport: Sailing
- Class: Laser Radial
Medal record
Sailing
Representing Argentina
Pan American Games
Bronze medal – third place	2003 Santo Domingo	Laser Radial

Florencia Cerutti Bogado (Note: In this Spanish name, the first or paternal surname is Cerutti and the second or maternal family name is Bogado.) (born 12 September 1982) is a Laser Radial sailor from Argentina, who made an official debut for her sporting discipline at the 2008 Summer Olympics in Beijing. She placed twenty-second in the Laser Radial class, with a score of 125 points at the end of nine races.

Shortly after the Olympics, Cerutti had achieved a sixth-place position at the Palamos Christmas Race in Palamos, Spain.

She has had many coaching jobs around the world and currently teaches at Chicago Yacht Club in Chicago, IL, USA.
