= Eliane Fierro =

Mexican sailor (born 1964)

Personal information
- Nationality: Mexican
- Born: 19 November 1964 (age 60)

Sport
- Sport: Sailing

Eliane Fierro (born 19 November 1964) is a Mexican sailor. She competed in the women's 470 event at the 1988 Summer Olympics.
