= Cathy MacAleavey =

Irish sailor

Personal information
- Nationality: Irish
- Born: 21 April 1958 (age 66)

Sport
- Sport: Sailing

Cathy MacAleavey (born 21 April 1958) is an Irish sailor. She competed in the women's 470 event at the 1988 Summer Olympics.
