= Ciara Peelo =

Irish sailor

Medal record

Sailing

Representing Ireland

World Championships
Bronze medal – third place	2002 Buffalo	Laser Radial

Ciara Peelo (born 1 October 1979) is an Irish sailor. Born in Dublin, Ireland, Peelo represented Ireland at the 2008 Summer Olympics in the women's Laser Radial class, where she finished 20th. She was the Irish flagbearer during the 2008 Summer Olympics opening ceremony in Beijing.
