= Line Flem Høst =

Norwegian sailors

Line Høst
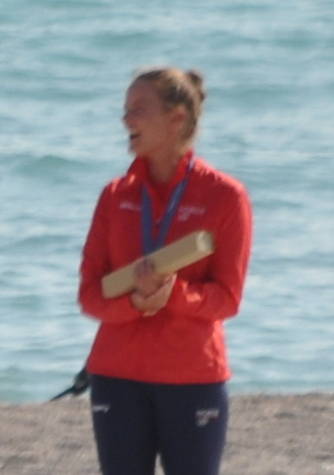
- Høst at the 2024 Summer Olympics

Personal information
- Nationality: Norwegian
- Born: 10 November 1995 (age 30) Oslo, Norway

Sport
- Sport: Sailing
- Club: Royal Norwegian Yacht Club
Medal record
Representing Norway
Olympic Games
Bronze medal – third place	2024 Paris	Laser Radial
World Championships
Bronze medal – third place	2020 Melbourne	Laser Radial

Line Flem Høst (born 10 November 1995) is a Norwegian competitive sailor, born in Oslo. She won a bronze medal at the 2020 Women's Laser Radial World Championship in Melbourne. She competed at the 2020 Summer Olympics in Tokyo 2021, in Laser Radial.

She was selected to represent Norway at the 2024 Summer Olympics, where she won the bronze medal.
