= Laser Radial World Championships =

Laser Radial World Championships may refer to:

- Men's Laser Radial World Championships
- Women's Laser Radial World Championships
