= Maria Vlachou =

Greek sailor (born 1973)

Personal information
- Nationality: Greek
- Born: 8 August 1973 (age 52)

Sailing career
- Sport: Sailing
- Class: Europe
Medal record
Sailing
Representing Greece
World Championships
Gold medal – first place	1991 Porto Carras	Laser Radial

Maria Vlachou (Greek: Μαρία Βλάχου; born 8 August 1973) is a Greek sailor.

Vlachou won the 1991 Women's Laser Radial World Championship in Porto Carras. She competed in the Europe event at the 2000 Summer Olympics, where she finished 18th.
