= Cinthia Knoth =

Brazilian sailor

Personal information
- Born: August 18, 1962 (age 62); Rio de Janeiro, Brazil

Sport
- Country: Brazil
- Sport: Sailing

Cinthia Knoth (born 18 August 1962) is a former Brazilian female sailor. She competed at the 1988 Summer Olympics representing Brazil in the Women's 470 event.
