= Tania Fierro =

Mexican sailor (born 1972)

Personal information
- Nationality: Mexican
- Born: 2 February 1972 (age 53)

Sport
- Sport: Sailing

Tania Fierro (born 2 February 1972) is a Mexican sailor. She competed in the women's 470 event at the 1988 Summer Olympics.
