= Gail Johnson (sailor) =

Canadian sailor (born 1964)

Personal information
- Born: 16 November 1964 (age 62) Montreal, Quebec, Canada

Sport
- Sport: Sailing

Gail Johnson (born 16 November 1964) is a Canadian sailor. She competed in the women's 470 event at the 1988 Summer Olympics.
