= Larissa Nevierov =

Italian sailor

Personal information
- Nationality: Italian
- Born: 18 September 1974 (age 52) Trieste, Italy
- Height: 177 cm (5 ft 10 in)
- Weight: 70 kg (154 lb)

Sport
- Country: Italy
- Sport: Sailing
- Event: Laser Radial
- Club: Aeronautica Militare
Medal record
Sailing
Representing Italy
Laser Radial World Championships
Gold medal – first place	1998 Medemblik	Laser Radial
Silver medal – second place	1995 Tenerife	Laser Radial
Silver medal – second place	1996 Simon's Town	Laser Radial
Silver medal – second place	2001 Vilanove	Laser Radial
Mediterranean Games
Silver medal – second place	2001 Tunis	Laser Radial
Summer Universiade
Bronze medal – third place	1999 Palma de Mallorca	Europe

Larissa Nevierov (born 18 September 1974) is an Italian sailor who won the Laser Radial World Championships in 1998.

She participated in three editions of the Summer Olympics (2000, 2004, 2008). Now she is coach of the Italian women's Laser Radial national team.
