= Gintarė Scheidt =

Lithuanian sailor (born 1982)

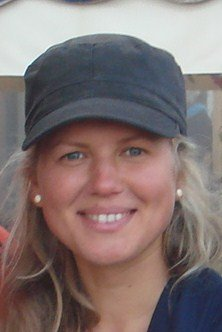

Personal information
- Full name: Gintarė Volungevičiūtė-Scheidt
- Nationality: Lithuanian
- Born: 12 November 1982 (age 43) Kaunas, Lithuanian SSR, Soviet Union
- Height: 1.71 m (5 ft 7 in)
- Weight: 64 kg (141 lb)

Sailing career
- Sport: Sailing
- Class(es): Laser Radial, Snipe
Medal record
Women's Sailing
Representing Lithuania
Olympic Games
Silver medal – second place	2008 Beijing	Laser Radial
Women's World Championships
Gold medal – first place	2012 Boltenhagen	Laser Radial
Silver medal – second place	2023 Valencia	Snipe
Women's European Championships
Silver medal – second place	2006 Riccone	Laser Radial
Bronze medal – third place	2010 Tallinn	Laser Radial
Gold medal – first place	2019 Antwerp	Snipe

Gintarė Volungevičiūtė-Scheidt (born 12 November 1982) is an Olympic medal-winning dinghy sailor from Lithuania.

== Career ==
Growing up in Kaunas, she frequently went to the Kaunas Reservoir yacht club, where her uncle worked. Growing fond of sailing, she decided at an early age to take up the sport.

Volungevičiūtė competed in the Olympic debut series for the women's single-handed dinghy class, the Laser Radial, during the 2008 Summer Olympics in China. She was the only sailor in the Lithuanian 2008 Olympic team. Volungevičiūtė won the 4th and 5th fleet races in the Olympic Laser Radial series, as well as the medal race, the last (10th), winning the silver medal.

During a test event for the Olympics China held in 2007, Volungevičiūtė met Brazilian sailor Robert Scheidt, a two-time Laser gold medalist – who would also win a medal in 2008, in the Star class. The two started dating, and married in October 2008, with Gintarė taking his surname. The couple lives in Italy with their two children.

Scheidt was chosen as the Lithuania flag bearer during the 2016 Summer Olympics.

== Olympics results ==
Year	Event	Race										Final	Score	Rank
Year	Event	1	2	3	4	5	6	7	8	9	10	Final	Score	Rank
2008	Laser Radial	3	13	8	1	1	4	~~21~~	6	4	CAN	1st	42	2
2012	Laser Radial	2	13	9	10	3	~~14~~	11	7	7	6	7th	82	6th
2016	Laser Radial	~~38~~	1	8	8	12	5	12	21	4	11	4th	90	7th

== Other notable international results ==
Year	Class	Competition	Position
2023	Snipe – Women	Class World Championship	2
2019	Snipe – Women	Class European Championship	1
2016	Laser Radial – Women	Class World Championship	5
2016	Laser Radial – Women	Class European Championship	4
2015	Laser Radial – Women	Class World Championship	19
2014	Laser Radial – Women	ISAF Sailing World Championships	34
2012	Laser Radial – Women	Class World Championship	1
2011	Laser Radial – Women	ISAF Sailing World Championships	5
2010	Laser Radial – Women	Class European Championship	3
2010	Laser Radial – All	Lithuanian Championships	1
2008	Laser Radial – Women	Class World Championship	4
2007	Laser Radial – Women	ISAF Sailing World Championships	21
2007	Laser Radial – Women	Class European Championship	4
2007	Laser Radial – All	Lithuanian Championships	1
2006	Laser Radial – Women	Class European Championship	2
2006	Laser Radial – All	Lithuanian Championships	1
2005	Laser Radial – Women	Class European Championship	7
2005	Laser Radial – Women	Class World Championship	20
2005	Laser Radial – Women	Kiel Week	1
2005	Laser Radial – All	Lithuanian Championships	1
2003	Europe – Women	ISAF Sailing World Championships	60
1998	Laser Radial – All	Lithuanian Championships	1

Olympic Games
Preceded by Virgilijus Alekna	Flagbearer for Lithuania; Rio de Janeiro 2016	Succeeded by Sandra Jablonskytė; Giedrius Titenis
