= Sarah Blanck =

Australian sailor

Medal record

Sailing

Representing Australia

World Championships
| Gold medal – first place | 1997 Mohemedia | Laser Radial |

Sarah Blanck (born 18 January 1977 in Melbourne) is an Australian olympic sailor.

A member of the Royal Brighton Yacht Club, she has represented Australia at both the 2004 and the 2008 Olympics, sailing the women's singlehanded dinghy, the Laser Radial. In both Games she finished fourth. She was an Australian Institute of Sport scholarship holder.

World Championship Titles

- 1st 1995 IYRU Youth World Championships
- 1st 1997 Laser Radial Women's World Championship
- 1st 2002 Europe World Championships

Blanck attended Luther College during her high school years.
