= Iryna Chunykhovska =

Soviet sailor (born 1967)

Medal record

Representing Soviet Union

Sailing

Olympic Games
Bronze medal – third place	1988 Seoul	470 class

Iryna Volodymyrivna Chunykhovska (Ukrainian: Ірина Володимирівна Чуниховська; born 16 July 1967) is a former sailor, who competed for the Soviet Union. She won a bronze medal in the 470 class at the 1988 Summer Olympics with Larisa Moskalenko.
