= Silke Preuß =

German sailor (born 1965)

Personal information
- Nationality: German
- Born: 5 October 1965 (age 60) Berlin, Germany

Sport
- Sport: Sailing

Silke Preuß (born 5 October 1965) is a German sailor. She competed in the women's 470 event at the 1988 Summer Olympics.
