= Albert Techov =

Lithuanian judoka (born 1980)

Albert Techov (born March 28, 1980, in Vilnius) is a Lithuanian judoka.

== Achievements ==
Year	Tournament	Place	Weight class
2007	European Judo Championships	5th	Extra lightweight (60 kg)
