= Lynne Jewell =

American sailor (born 1959)

Personal information
- Born: November 26, 1959 (age 66) Burbank, California, U.S.

Sport
- College team: Boston University
Medal record
Women's sailing
Representing the United States
Olympic Games
Gold medal – first place	1988 Seoul	470 class
World Championships
Silver medal – second place	1980 Kingston	Laser Radial
Silver medal – second place	1983 Kingsport	Laser Radial
Silver medal – second place	1985 Halmstad	Laser Radial

Lynne M. Jewell (born November 26, 1959, in Burbank, California) is an American sailor and Olympic champion.

Jewell attended Boston University and while there participated in competitive yachting. She was the Yachtswoman of the Year of the New York Yacht Club in 1980, the champion of the International Yacht Racing Union in 1980 and 1984, and the Rolex Yachtswoman of the Year in 1980 and 1988. In 1983, Jewel was the U. S. Singlehanded National Champion. She won a gold medal in the 470 Class at the 1988 Summer Olympics in Seoul, together with Allison Jolly.

Jewell earned her bachelor's degree in 1981 and continued with a master's degree in science and education from Northeastern University in Boston. She married Bill Shore and in 1985 moved to Rhode Island. After attending Rhode Island School of Design, Shore became an interior designer. She was inducted into the Rhode Island Heritage Hall of Fame in 2004.
