= Viktorija Andrulytė =

Lithuanian yacht racer (born 1992)

Medal record

Women's sailing

Representing Lithuania

World Championships
| Bronze medal – third place | 2021 Al-Mussanah | Laser Radial |

European Championships
| Silver medal – second place | 2024 Athens | ILCA 6 |

European U-18 Championships
| Silver medal – second place | 2009 Finland | Laser 4.7 |

Viktorija Andrulytė (born 16 April 1992) is a Lithuanian yacht racer. She competes in Laser Radial class.

== Biography ==
In 2009 Andrulytė won silver in European junior championships. In 2010 Andrulytė participated in senior European championships where she finished 29th in Laser Radial class. In 2011 Andrulytė finished 15th at European Championships. In 2014 Andrulytė finished 10th in European championships. During 2014 ISAF Sailing World Championships she finished 22nd and secured qualification quota for Lithuania in 2016 Summer Olympics.

In 2013 Andrulytė was awarded Best Lithuanian Female Sailor of the Year title.

In 2021 Andrulytė finished 25th at the 2020 Summer Olympics.
