= Keiko Nogami (sailor) =

Japanese sailor (born 1947)

Personal information
- Nationality: Japanese
- Born: 20 December 1947 (age 77)

Sport
- Sport: Sailing

Keiko Nogami (野上 敬子, Nogami Keiko; born 20 December 1947) is a Japanese sailor. She competed in the women's 470 event at the 1988 Summer Olympics.
