= Susanne Theel =

German sailor

Personal information
- Nationality: German
- Born: 11 June 1963 (age 61); Berlin, Germany

Sport
- Sport: Sailing

Susanne Theel (born 11 June 1963) is a German sailor. She competed in the women's 470 event at the 1988 Summer Olympics.
