= Darius Škarnulis =

Lithuanian racewalker (born 1977)

Personal information
- Nationality: Lithuania
- Born: 21 October 1977 (age 48) Alytus, Lithuania
- Height: 1.86 m (6 ft 1 in)
- Weight: 68 kg (150 lb)

Sport
- Sport: Athletics
- Event: Race walking

Darius Škarnulis (born October 21, 1977, in Alytus) is a Lithuanian race walker. Škarnulis represented Lithuania at the 2008 Summer Olympics in Beijing, and competed in the men's 50 km race walk, along with his teammate and twin brother Donatas. While his twin brother did not finish the walk, Darius received a final warning (a total of three red cards) for not following the proper form during the 10 km lap, and was subsequently disqualified.

Škarnulis is from Vilnius, Lithuania. He was also a successful marathon runner, winning the 2009 Vilnius Marathon in a time of 2:33:16. The marathon also served as the Lithuanian Athletics Championships over the distance, making him the 2009 national marathon champion. In 2018, Škarnulis won the final stage of the Lithuanian Running Cup over the half marathon distance.
