= Nives Monico =

Italian yacht racer (born 1964)

Nives Monico (born 3 July 1964) is an Italian yacht racer who competed in the 1988 Summer Olympics.
