= Larisa Moskalenko =

Soviet sailor

Medal record

Sailing

Olympic Games

Representing Soviet Union
Bronze medal – third place	1988 Seoul	470 class

World Championships

Representing Soviet Union
Silver medal – second place	1991 Brisbane	470 class

Goodwill Games

Representing Soviet Union
Silver medal – second place	1986 Moscow	470 class

European Championships

Representing Soviet Union
Silver medal – second place	1991 Bergen	470 class

Representing CIS
Bronze medal – third place	1992 Nieuwpoort	470 class

Larysa Moskalenko (born 3 January 1963) is a former sailor, who competed for the Soviet Union and Unified Team. She won a bronze medal in the 470 class at the 1988 Summer Olympics with Iryna Chunykhovska.

She moved to Italy in 1993 and ran a luxury boat rental business. In 2013, she was arrested after she had been hired to provide speed boats to a norwegian company who specialized in helping returning kidnapped children.."
