= Sophie Berge =

French yacht racer (born 1964)

Sophie Berge (born 5 July 1964) is a French yacht racer who competed in the 1988 Summer Olympics.
