= Florence Lebrun =

French yacht racer

Florence Lebrun (born 24 March 1959) is a French offshore sailor and yacht racer who also competed in the 1988 Summer Olympics, in the 1992 Summer Olympics, and in the 1996 Summer Olympics.
