= Anna Bacchiega =

Italian yacht racer (born 1957)

Anna Maria Bacchiega (born 18 July 1957) is an Italian yacht racer who competed in the 1988 Summer Olympics.
