= 2023 Sailing World Championships – ILCA 6 =

ILCA 6 at the 2023 Sailing World Championships
- Venue: The Hague, the Netherlands
- Dates: 13–20 August
- Competitors: 110 from 54 nations

Medalists
gold medal	Mária Érdi	Hungary
silver medal	Maud Jayet	Switzerland
bronze medal	Anne-Marie Rindom	Denmark

The ILCA 6 competition at the 2023 Sailing World Championships was the women's dinghy event and was held in The Hague, the Netherlands, 13–20 August 2023. The entries were limited to 120 boats. The competitors participated in an opening series that was planned to 10 races, followed by a medal race. The medal race was planned for 20 August.

The competition served as a qualifying event for the 2024 Olympic sailing competition with 16 out of 43 national quota being distributed at the event.

== Summary ==
Anne-Marie Rindom of Denmark was the reigning world champion, having won the 2022 ILCA 6 World Championships in Kemah, Texas. The entry list also included Dutch sailor, three-time Olympic medallist, and reigning European champion Marit Bouwmeester. Bouwmeester had also won the Paris 2024 Test Event the month before. In the Sailing World Cup, Bouwmeester had won the Trofeo Princesa Sofía, Sarah Douglas of Canada had won the Semaine Olympique Française, Maxime Jonker of the Netherlands had won the Allianz Regatta, and Nazlı Çağla Dönertaş of Turkey had won the Kiel Week.

After the first day, two sailors were standing on six points – Mária Érdi of Hungary who had taken one race win and one fifth place, and Carolina Albano of Italy, who had recorded one fourth place and one second place. By 17 August, Emma Plasschaert of Belgium had overtaken the lead, one point ahead of Érdi, followed by Maud Jayet of Switzerland and Josefin Olsson of Sweden, all within 11 points. Into the medal race, five sailors stood within nine points, Jayet four points ahead of Érdi and Rindom, further five points ahead of Bouwmeester and Charlotte Rose of the United States. Érdi, finishing third in the medal race, won the title ahead of Jayet, who had become penalised on the second leg, and Rindom received the bronze medal.

With the final results, national quotas were awarded Hungary, Switzerland, Denmark, the Netherlands, the United States, Belgium, Sweden, Portugal, Italy, Australia, Great Britain, Germany, Poland, Norway, Argentina and Canada.

== Results ==
Results of individual races
Pos	Helmsman	Country	I	II	III	IV	V	VI	VII	VIII	IX	X	MR	Tot	Pts
Gold medal	Mária Érdi	Hungary	5	1	3	7	17	4	22	6	49^{†}	4	6	124	75
Silver medal	Maud Jayet	Switzerland	21	15	43^{†}	1	1	2	2	7	3	13	14	122	79
Bronze medal	Anne-Marie Rindom	Denmark	2	12	8	3	9	24^{†}	19	5	10	1	12	105	81
4	Marit Bouwmeester	Netherlands	1	19	7	11	5	11	7	36^{†}	6	7	10	120	84
5	Charlotte Rose	United States	4	9	39^{†}	23	12	7	5	1	15	2	18	135	96
6	Emma Plasschaert	Belgium	7	11	30	2	2	3	15	2	31^{†}	22	4	129	98
7	Josefin Olsson	Sweden	1	13	9	10	23	9	1	10	27	BFD 56^{†}	2	161	105
8	Vasileia Karachaliou	Portugal	15	8	25	6	4	13	12	12	UFD 56^{†}	11	8	170	114
9	Carolina Albano	Italy	4	2	4	22	10	16	21	8	24^{†}	19	20	150	126
10	Mara Stransky	Australia	28	2	2	22	15	25	40^{†}	14	4	10	STP 17	179	139
11	Hannah Snellgrove	Great Britain	28	3	22	2	7	15	3	40	41^{†}	3	–	164	123
12	Anna Munch	Denmark	3	20	15	9	11	20	4	37^{†}	14	29	–	162	125
13	Julia Büsselberg	Germany	2	11	4	30	6	34	18	39^{†}	1	23	–	168	129
14	Mirthe Akkerman	Netherlands	30^{†}	15	23	26	27	6	13	4	11	8	–	163	133
15	Erika Reineke	United States	3	20	7	8	29	DSQ 56^{†}	25	16	7	18	–	189	133
16	Casey Imeneo	Australia	16	5	8	35	3	1	36^{†}	24	26	28	–	182	146
17	Maxime Jonker	Netherlands	BFD 56^{†}	16	2	47	20	8	8	25	12	16	–	210	154
18	Agata Barwińska	Poland	18	21	9	6	35^{†}	27	6	22	32	14	–	190	155
19	Line Flem Høst	Norway	16	27	13	17	13	29	14	18	9	BFD 56^{†}	–	212	156
20	Chiara Benini Floriani	Italy	14	14	52^{†}	32	33	10	9	3	39	9	–	215	163
21	Marie Barrue	France	25	24	1	45^{†}	34	12	24	15	21	12	–	213	168
22	Pia Kuhlmann	Germany	17	32	19	28	8	39^{†}	23	9	2	32	–	209	170
23	Lucía Falasca	Argentina	10	3	21	23	21	23	28^{†}	21	28	24	–	202	174
24	Sarah Douglas	Canada	BFD 56^{†}	14	35	4	45	5	10	30	13	21	–	233	177
25	Monika Mikkola	Finland	6	22	26	12	DSQ 56^{†}	14	32	19	35	17	–	239	183
26	Daisy Collingridge	Great Britain	8	4	36	21	22	31	38	20	48^{†}	5	–	233	185
27	Christina Sakellaris	United States	BFD 56^{†}	9	14	21	36	18	11	28	29	26	–	248	192
28	Ecem Güzel	Turkey	13	18	3	46^{†}	16	17	43	41	17	25	–	239	193
29	Silvia Zennaro	Italy	32	BFD 56^{†}	16	5	24	38	16	11	23	30	–	251	195
30	Anja von Allmen	Switzerland	15	7	34	4	49^{†}	40	30	33	16	20	–	248	199
31	Elyse Ainsworth	Australia	12	7	46^{†}	27	28	26	20	34	33	15	–	248	202
32	Nazlı Çağla Dönertaş	Turkey	22	4	20	37	18	19	34	35	20	BFD 56^{†}	–	265	209
33	Lillian Myers	United States	26	10	43	13	26	28	49	50^{†}	22	6	–	273	223
34	Stephanie Norton	Hong Kong	19	23	10	30	31	37	53^{†}	23	18	38	–	282	229
35	Zoe Thomson	Australia	11	23	18	16	19	33	42	27	42	43^{†}	–	274	231
36	Matilda Nicholls	Great Britain	25	22	29	15	14	30	46	45	8	BFD 56^{†}	–	290	234
37	Shai Kakon	Israel	21	40	45^{†}	5	37	21	33	26	19	37	–	284	239
38	Hannah Anderssohn	Germany	13	36	15	53^{†}	30	22	44	13	46	27	–	299	246
39	Cristina Pujol	Spain	9	28	RET 56^{†}	18	25	48	27	17	43	33	–	304	248
40	Wiktoria Gołębiowska	Poland	7	17	41	10	42	DSQ 56^{†}	39	47	5	46	–	310	254
41	Sandra Lulić	Croatia	27	18	14	39	46	50^{†}	17	29	38	35	–	313	263
42	Matilda Talluri	Italy	17	5	38	7	43	42	45	48^{†}	47	34	–	326	278
43	Ebru Bolat	Romania	42	1	17	40	38	35	29	49^{†}	40	36	–	327	278
44	Florencia Chiarella	Peru	35	10	19	24	40	36	51^{†}	31	44	41	–	331	280
45	Nur Shazrin Mohd Latif	Malaysia	BFD 56^{†}	16	24	17	47	32	41	38	25	45	–	341	285
46	Luciana Cardozo	Argentina	12	8	12	48	48	45	35	42	36	BFD 56^{†}	–	342	286
47	Maura Dewey	Canada	8	6	BFD 56^{†}	20	41	51	31	46	45	40	–	344	288
48	Laura Schewe	Germany	31	32	37	3	51^{†}	49	26	32	34	44	–	339	288
49	Zhang Dongshuang	China	10	33	10	46	32	46	52^{†}	43	30	48	–	350	298
50	Sylvie Stannage	Australia	9	26	23	38	39	43	47	53^{†}	50	31	–	359	306
51	Hanna Koba	Sweden	5	37	16	40	44	53^{†}	37	44	51	42	–	369	316
52	Yumiko Tombe	Japan	39	6	5	36	54^{†}	47	54	52	52	39	–	384	330
53	Cristina Castellanos	Guatemala	38	13	6	43	52	44	48	51	RET 56^{†}	47	–	398	342
54	Alina Shapovalova	Ukraine	BFD 56^{†}	17	21	15	53	52	50	54	37	49	–	404	348
55	Gabriella Kidd	Brazil	23	BFD 56^{†}	22	11	50	41	DNC 56	DNC 56	DNC 56	DNC 56	–	427	371
56	Eve McMahon	Ireland	11	BFD 56^{†}	47	31	1	2	2	3	3	1	–	157	101
57	Marissa Ijben	Netherlands	BFD 56^{†}	21	13	32	4	7	5	14	9	10	–	171	115
58	Louise Cervera	France	BFD 56^{†}	BFD 56	12	20	17	5	1	6	6	7	–	186	130
59	Yelena Vorobeva	Croatia	27	39^{†}	34	34	9	12	14	2	2	2	–	175	136
60	Giorgia Della Valle	Italy	37	28	26	12	6	3	UFD 56^{†}	4	18	3	–	193	137
61	Martina Reino	Spain	BFD 56^{†}	25	BFD 56	1	5	8	4	13	7	23	–	198	142
62	Evie Saunders	Australia	35^{†}	33	5	33	26	10	7	1	10	19	–	179	144
63	Dolores Moreira	Uruguay	30	19	BFD 56^{†}	35	10	DPI 17	8	9	16	14	–	214	158
64	Molly Sacker	Great Britain	22	29	32^{†}	18	2	27	11	21	20	15	–	197	165
65	Pernelle Michon	France	31	BFD 56^{†}	49	51	3	16	3	7	1	5	–	222	166
66	Viktorija Andrulytė	Lithuania	33	31	48^{†}	14	25	15	12	16	4	16	–	214	166
67	Eline Verstraelen	Belgium	36	12	25	44^{†}	30	37	6	8	14	4	–	216	172
68	Coralie Vittecoq	Canada	24	31	11	34^{†}	8	19	9	23	21	27	–	207	173
69	Nancy Jane Highfield	Hong Kong	20	37	29	45^{†}	13	13	15	20	8	21	–	221	176
70	Nethra Kumanan	India	34	24	11	41^{†}	21	9	10	22	23	31	–	226	185
71	Olivia Christie	New Zealand	19	43	17	55^{†}	14	29	22	10	17	24	–	250	195
72	Clara Gravely	Canada	46	29	18	28	11	35	UFD 56^{†}	5	13	11	–	252	196
73	Marilena Makri	Cyprus	29	38	1	48	12	21	RET 56^{†}	19	19	17	–	260	204
74	Ana Moncada	Spain	18	26	51	24	34	4	UFD 56^{†}	12	15	22	–	262	206
75	Hallie Schiffman	United States	32	34	40^{†}	25	19	17	19	17	36	8	–	247	207
76	Adriana Penruddocke	Bermuda	BFD 56^{†}	52	6	31	32	22	33	18	11	6	–	267	211
77	Lin Pletikos	Slovenia	40^{†}	39	28	8	37	23	16	24	12	25	–	252	212
78	Elena Oetling	Mexico	BFD 56^{†}	44	BFD 56	39	20	1	21	28	5	9	–	279	223
79	Gu Min	China	6	BFD 56^{†}	44	27	7	24	29	27	25	35	–	280	224
80	Rosine Baudet	Switzerland	43^{†}	35	32	19	29	11	37	26	22	20	–	274	231
81	Katariina Roihu	Estonia	33	35	31	19	27	43^{†}	13	35	29	13	–	278	235
82	Sophia Montgomery	Thailand	29	34	35^{†}	16	28	26	18	31	31	28	–	276	241
83	Alenka Valencic	Slovenia	48^{†}	40	27	26	15	39	17	15	32	40	–	299	251
84	Greta Pilkington	New Zealand	23	45	30	14	22	36	32	11	UFD 56^{†}	41	–	310	254
85	Ines Gmati	Tunisia	14	27	BFD 56^{†}	29	48	18	30	44	24	29	–	319	263
86	Linda Hensel	Germany	26	25	44	37	45^{†}	32	26	29	28	18	–	310	265
87	Daniela Rivera	Venezuela	40	42^{†}	31	29	18	25	23	37	35	33	–	313	271
88	Ursula Balas	Croatia	BFD 56^{†}	46	24	38	35	14	28	43	34	12	–	330	274
89	Lara Himmes	Spain	BFD 56^{†}	BFD 56	33	52	16	20	20	25	26	26	–	330	274
90	Klára Himmelová	Czech Republic	BFD 56^{†}	30	20	42	24	51	25	32	27	38	–	345	289
91	Romi Safin	Estonia	43	47^{†}	39	43	36	31	24	30	33	30	–	356	309
92	Sophie Zimmermann	Peru	45	38	40	52^{†}	23	33	27	40	37	32	–	367	315
93	Sophia Morgan	Fiji	20	41	45^{†}	33	40	41	40	36	30	43	–	369	324
94	Evangelia Karageorgou	Greece	39	BFD 56^{†}	33	9	39	44	34	34	DNC 56	DNC 56	–	400	344
95	Honoka Miura	Japan	24	44	37	53^{†}	47	40	42	41	44	34	–	406	353
96	María José Poncell	Chile	34	36	36	49	52^{†}	42	36	38	40	44	–	407	355
97	Sofiia Naumenko	Ukraine	BFD 56^{†}	41	27	44	33	38	DNF 56	42	39	39	–	415	359
98	Agustina Jordán	Chile	44	STP 43	38	42	38	30	UFD 56^{†}	47	45	36	–	419	363
99	Diana Markova	Bulgaria	DPI 38	50^{†}	41	STP 50	42	46	39	33	41	37	–	417	367
100	Deizy Nhaquile	Mozambique	49^{†}	45	42	13	46	45	31	49	48	49	–	417	368
101	Mai Kakimoto	Japan	45	53	28	55^{†}	31	52	41	45	42	47	–	439	384
102	Argyro Kouravelou	Greece	47	BFD 56^{†}	53	25	41	28	UFD 56	39	DNC 56	DNC 56	–	457	401
103	Mariela Nikolova	Bulgaria	DPI 45	54^{†}	46	STP 42	44	49	35	48	47	50	–	460	406
104	Chen Pin-Chieh	Chinese Taipei	41	43	42	51	DPI 53.8^{†}	48	45	52	43	45	–	463.8	410
105	Yuuri Yamamoto	Japan	42	51	48	54^{†}	49	50	38	46	38	48	–	464	410
106	Charlotte Webster	Cayman Islands	41	49	54	50	50	34	44	50	UFD 56^{†}	42	–	470	414
107	Vaimooia Ripley	Samoa	46	48	47	47	53^{†}	47	43	51	46	46	–	474	421
108	Alessia Palanti	Czech Republic	38	30	50	36	43	DNC 56^{†}	DNC 56	DNC 56	DNC 56	DNC 56	–	477	421
109	Nelle Leenders	Fiji	50	46	49	55^{†}	54	53	46	53	49	51	–	506	451
110	Estere Paula Kumpiņa	Latvia	36	DNF 56^{†}	DNE 56	50	DNC 56	DNC 56	DNC 56	DNC 56	DNC 56	DNC 56	–	534	478

Scoring system: low-point system; Source:
Legend: – Qualified for medal race(s); BFD – Black flag disqualification; DNC – Did not come to the starting area; DNE – Non excludable disqualification; DNF – Did not finish; DPI – Discretionary penalty imposed; DSQ – Disqualified; RET – Retired; STP – Standard penalty imposed; UFD – "U" flag disqualification; † – Discarded race not counted in the overall result;
