= Bianca Leilua =

Samoan sailor

Sport
- Country: Samoa
- Sport: Saling
Medal record
Women's sailing
Representing Samoa
Pacific Games
Gold medal – first place	2019 Apia	Team Laser Radial
Silver medal – second place	2019 Apia	Individual Laser Radial
Pacific Mini Games
Silver medal – second place	2013 Mata Utu	Team Laser Radial

Bianca Leilua is a competitive sailor from Samoa who has represented Samoa at the Pacific Games and Pacific Mini Games. In 2015 she was Samoa's first female entrant in the Youth Sailing World Championships.

== Life ==
Leilua started sailing at the age of 9 in an Optimist, and began competing when she was 12 years old. She is the younger sister of Eroni Leilua.

Leilua is from Vaivase-uta in Apia. She was educated at Lynfield College in Auckland, New Zealand. In 2013 she represented Samoa at the Pacific Mini Games in Wallis and Fortuna, winning a silver medal. In 2015 she received a scholarship from World Sailing's Emerging Nations Programme and competed at the Youth Sailing World Championships. The same year, she competed at the Pacific Games in the Laser Radial event. In a field of 11 boats, Leilua finished fifth.

At the 2019 Pacific Games in Apia she won silver in the individual competition, and (alongside Vaimooia Ripley) gold in the team competition.
