= Sailing at the 2013 Pacific Mini Games =

Sailing, for the 2013 Pacific Mini Games, took place from Tekaviki Island, in front of the Vakala sailing HQ. The island is located in the northeast from Mata-Utu. Races took place from 3 to 12 September 2013. The Laser and the Hobie 16 classes (individual and team events) were held at these Games.

== Results ==
=== Medal table ===
Rank	Nation	Gold	Silver	Bronze	Total
1	New Caledonia	3	2	1	6
2	Fiji	2	0	1	3
3	Cook Islands	1	2	1	4
4	Wallis and Futuna	0	1	1	2
5	Samoa	0	1	0	1
6	Papua New Guinea	0	0	2	2
Totals (6 entries)		6	6	6	18

=== Medal summary ===
Event	Gold	Silver	Bronze
Men's Laser single	(New Caledonia) Vincent Trinquet	(Cook Islands) Taua Elisa	(Cook Islands) Junior Charlie Poiri
Men's Laser team	New Caledonia; Vincent Trinquet; Guillaume Esplas	Cook Islands; Taua Elisa; Junior Charlie Poiri	Fiji; Robert Hazelman; Michael Chan
Women's Laser Radial single	(Cook Islands) Teau Moana McKenzie	(New Caledonia) Lauren Hautier	(New Caledonia) Tiphaine Le Roux
Women's Laser Radial team	New Caledonia; Lauren Hautier; Tiphaine Le Roux	Samoa; Valerie Humrich; Bianca Leilua	Papua New Guinea; Rose-Lee Numa; Sariva Keiloi
Hobie 16 pair	Fiji; Shayne Brodie; Torika Brodie	New Caledonia; Tho Dupond; Ali Angibaud	Wallis and Futuna; J.J. Halakilikili; Lydie Greffet
Hobie 16 team	Fiji; Shayne Brodie; Torika Brodie; Graham Southwick; Aquimeleki Tuicaucau	Wallis and Futuna; J.J. Halakilikili; Lydie Greffet; Sala Tuulaki; Jonas Apriou	Papua New Guinea; Charlie Navu Gerea Buggsy; David John; Peter Takura; Harry Haro
