= 2022 Youth Sailing World Championships – Girl's Formula Kite =

Girl's Formula Kite at the 2022 Youth Sailing World Championships
- Venue: Al-Mussanah, Oman
- Dates: 8 - 15 July
- Competitors: 29 from 29 nations

Medalists
gold medal	Julia Damasiewicz	Israel
silver medal	Héloïse Pégourié	France
bronze medal	Derİn Atakan	Turkey

The girl's Formula Kite competition at the 2022 Youth Sailing World Championships took place between July 8 and 15 2022. 9 sailors from 9 nations were due to compete. Israeli Gal Zukerman won the event.

== Results ==
Pos	Helm	Country	R1	R2	R3	R4	R5	R6	R7	R8	R9	R10	R11	R12	R13	R14	R15	R16	R17	R18	Total	Nett
1	Julia Damasiewicz	Poland	(2)	1	(2)	1	1	1	1	(2)	1	1	2	2	1	1	1	1	1	1	23	17
2	Héloïse Pegourie	France	1	(2)	1	2	2	(10 DNC)	(10 DNC)	1	2	2	1	1	2	2	2	2	2	2	47	25
3	Derİn Atakan	Turkey	3	(10 DNF)	3	4	(10 DNC)	3	2	3	3	3	3	(5)	3	3	3	3	3	3	70	45
4	Maria Catalina Turienzo	Argentina	(10 NSC)	4	(5)	5	4	4	5	4	4	5	5	4	5	(10 DNC)	4	5	5	5	93	68
5	Ella Geiger	United Kingdom	(10 DNC)	(10 DNF)	6	6	5	5	4	(10 DNC)	10 DNC	4	4	3	4	4	10 DNC	4	4	4	107	77
6	Gal Boker	Israel	(10 DNS)	3	4	3	3	2	3	(10 DNC)	(10 DNC)	10 DNC	10 DNC	10 DNC	10 DNC	10 DNC	10 DNC	10 DNC	10 DNC	10 DNC	138	108
7	Marija Dolenc	Croatia	(10 DNF)	(10 DNF)	(10 DNF)	10 DNF	10 DNC	10 DNC	10 DNC	5	10 DNC	10 DNC	10 DNC	10 DNC	10 DNC	10 DNC			10 DNC	10 DNC	166	136
8	Maddalena Spanu	Italy	(10 DNF)	(10 DNF)	(10 DNF)	10 DNF	10 NSC	10 DNC	10 DNC	10 DNC	5	10 DNF	6	10 DNF	6	10 DNF	10 DNF	10 DNF	10 DNF	10 DNF	167	137
9	Zoe Fernandez Ramos	Spain	(10 DNC)	(10 DNC)	(10 DNC)	10 DNF	10 DNF	10 DNF	10 DNF	10 DNF	10 DNF	6	10 DNF	10 DNF	7	10 DNS	10 DNC	10 DNC	10 DNC	10 DNC	173	143
