= Eve McMahon =

Irish sailor (born 2004)

Personal information
- Born: 25 February 2004 (age 22) Howth, County Dublin, Ireland
- Education: Institute of Education; University College Dublin

Sport
- Country: Ireland
- Sport: Laser Radial
Medal record
Representing Ireland
World Championships
Bronze medal – third place	2025 Qingdao	ILCA 6
World Youth Championships
Gold medal – first place	2022 The Hague	ILCA 6
U21 World Championships
Gold medal – first place	2023 Tangier	ILCA 6
Gold medal – first place	2024 Viana do Castelo	ILCA 6
Silver medal – second place	2022 Vilamoura	ILCA 6
European U23 Championships
Gold medal – first place	2026 Croatia	ILCA 6
Bronze medal – third place	2025 Marstrand	ILCA 6

Eve McMahon (born 25 February 2004) is an Irish sailor from Howth, County Dublin. She competed at the 2024 Paris Olympics in the ILCA 6 Dinghy class, finishing in 13th position.

She is a two-time Under-21 World Champion. She won a bronze medal at the 2025 ILCA World Championships in Qingdao in May 2025, having finished outside the top 50 in the 2023 event in The Hague.

She has been shortlisted in the RTÉ Young Sportsperson of the Year on three occasions.

A member of Howth yacht club, she attended the Institute of Education and University College Dublin (UCD), on a sports scholarship, and was named UCD's Sportsperson of the Year in 2024.
