= Nicky Touli =

Samoan competitive sailor

Sport
- Country: Samoa
- Sport: Sailing
Medal record
Men's Sailing
Representing Samoa
Pacific Games
Silver medal – second place	2019 Apia	Team Laser Radial

Nicky Touli (born ~1996) is a Samoan competitive sailor, who has represented Samoa at the Pacific Games.

Touli is from Vaitele on the island of Upolu. He works as a chef in Fox Glacier, New Zealand.

At the 2019 Pacific Games in Apia he came seventh in the individual Laser Radial, but won gold (alongside Eroni Leilua) in the men's team competition.
