= Sailing at the 2019 Pacific Games =

Sailing competition

- Venue: Mulifanua sailing course
- Location: Mulifanua, Samoa
- Dates: 9–19 July 2019

Sailing at the 2019 Pacific Games was held in Samoa from 9–19 July on the Mulifanua sailing course at the Sheraton Samoa Beach Resort at Mulifanua which is approximately 40 kilometres west of the capital, Apia. The competition schedule included men's, women's and team events. The equipment classes used were the Laser and Laser Radial dinghies, plus the Hobie 16 catamaran.

Australia and New Zealand were invited to compete at this regatta, with Australia sending a team of four sailors.

== Teams ==
The nations competing were:

- American Samoa
- Australia
- Cook Islands
- Fiji
- New Caledonia
- Papua New Guinea
- Samoa
- Solomon Islands
- Tahiti
- Vanuatu

== Medal summary ==
=== Medal table ===
Rank	Nation	Gold	Silver	Bronze	Total
1	New Caledonia	5	2	1	8
2	Samoa*	1	2	0	3
3	Fiji	0	2	2	4
4	Australia	0	0	2	2
5	Tahiti	0	0	1	1
Totals (5 entries)		6	6	6	18

=== Medalists ===
Event	Gold	Silver	Bronze	Ref
Men's Laser	Étienne Le Pen (NCL)	Maxime Mazard (NCL)	Will Sargent (AUS)	
Men's Laser team	New Caledonia; Maxime Mazard; Étienne Le Pen	Samoa; Eroni Leilua; Nicky Touli	Fiji; Amanu Simpson; Villiame Raului	
Women's Laser Radial	Juliette Bone (NCL)	Bianca Leilua (SAM)	Paris van den Herik (AUS)	
Women's Laser Radial team	Samoa; Bianca Leilua; Vaimooia Ripley	Fiji; Sophia Morgan; Nelle Leenders	New Caledonia; Juliette Bone (only one competitor)	
Hobie Cat	New Caledonia; Léo Belouard; Tom Picot	New Caledonia; Auxence Thomas; Jean De Sola	Fiji; Shayne Brodie; Nelle Leenders	
Hobie Cat team	New Caledonia; Léo Belouard; Tom Picot; Auxence Thomas; Jean De Sola	Fiji; Shayne Brodie; Nelle Leenders; Epeli Lulusago; Josese Lulusago	Tahiti; Tom Lamotte; Lucas Sola; Elise Djenadi; Alice Lemaitre	

== See also ==
- Sailing at the Pacific Games
