= RTÉ Sports Person of the Year =

Irish sports award

RTÉ Sports Personality of the Year Award
- Awarded for: Excellence in sporting achievement
- Country: Ireland
- Presented by: RTÉ Sport
- First award: 1985; 41 years ago
- Most recent winner: Paul O'Donovan (2024; rowing)
- Website: Official website

The RTÉ Sports Person of the Year Award is the titular award of the RTÉ Sports Awards ceremony, which takes place each December. The winner is the Irish sportsperson (from the island of Ireland) judged to have achieved the most that year. The winner is originally chosen by a special panel of RTÉ journalists and editorial staff, but is selected by a public vote from a predetermined shortlist in 2016.

== History ==
The first Irish sports award ceremony took place in 1985, and was closely modelled on the BBC Sports Personality of the Year Award.

Four people have won the award multiple times: athlete Sonia O'Sullivan won the award five times, including a record three successive awards, and golfer Pádraig Harrington and boxer Katie Taylor, with three wins, and golfer Rory McIlroy, who won it twice. The oldest recipient of the award is Christy O'Connor Jnr, who won in 1989 aged 41. Rory McIlroy, who first won in 2011, aged 22, is the youngest winner. Ten sporting disciplines have been represented; golf has the highest representation, with eight recipients.

Eamonn Darcy, Ronan Rafferty and Des Smyth, who won the Alfred Dunhill Cup in 1988, are the only non-individual winners of the award. Counting them separately, there have been thirty-four winners of the award (from 1985 to 2024). Seven of these have been Northern Irish. The most recent award was made in 2024 to double Olympic champion rower Paul O'Donovan.

== Winners ==
RTÉ Sports Person of the Year Award winners
Year	Winner	Sport	Sporting synopsis	Ref.
1985	Barry McGuigan	Boxing	Defeated Eusebio Pedroza to become World Boxing Association featherweight champion.	
1986	Seán Kelly	Cycling	He finished on a podium in a grand tour for the first time when he finished third in the 1986 Vuelta a España.	
1987	Stephen Roche	Cycling	Winner of the 1987 Tour de France, 1987 Giro d'Italia and 1987 World Cycling Championships, becoming only the second man after Eddy Merckx to win cycling's Triple Crown.	
1988	Eamonn Darcy Ronan Rafferty Des Smyth	Golf	For winning the 1988 Dunhill Cup.	
1989	Christy O'Connor Jnr	Golf	For a "pivotal" 2 iron shot on the last hole at the Belfry which he left just 4 feet from the hole during the successful 1989 Ryder Cup.	
1990	Packie Bonner	Soccer	For his penalty save from Daniel Timofte of Romania which propelled the Republic of Ireland to the quarter-final of the 1990 FIFA World Cup.	
1991	Ralph Keyes	Rugby union	Overall top scorer with 68 points at the 1991 Rugby World Cup.	
1992	Michael Carruth	Boxing	Gold medallist in the welterweight section at the 1992 Barcelona Olympic Games.	
1993	Sonia O'Sullivan	Athletics	Silver medallist in the 1500m at the World Championships.	
1994	Sonia O'Sullivan	Athletics	Gold medallist in the 3000m at the European Championships.	
1995	Sonia O'Sullivan	Athletics	Gold medallist in the 5000m at the World Championships.	
1996	Michelle Smith	Swimming	Triple Olympic gold medallist for the 400m individual medley, 400m freestyle and 200m individual medley, and bronze medallist for the 200m butterfly event.	
1997	Ken Doherty	Snooker	Winner of the 1997 World Snooker Championship.	
1998	Sonia O'Sullivan	Athletics	Double gold medallist at the World Cross-Country Championships and double gold medallist at the European Championships.	
1999	Roy Keane	Soccer	Captain of the Manchester United team that completed a treble of English Premier League, FA Cup, and Champions League successes.	
2000	Sonia O'Sullivan	Athletics	Olympic silver medallist in the women's 5000m at the 2000 Sydney Olympic Games. This was her record fifth win in the RTÉ Sports Person of the Year.	
2001	Mick McCarthy	Soccer	Secured qualification for the 2002 FIFA World Cup for the Republic of Ireland national soccer team.	
2002	Pádraig Harrington	Golf	Member of the European team that won the 2002 Ryder Cup.	
2003	Barry Geraghty	Horse racing	Winning jockey of the Aintree Grand National on Monty's Pass.	
2004	Ronan O'Gara	Rugby union	Out-half of the Ireland team that won the Triple Crown in the 2004 Six Nations Championship.	
2005	Seán Óg Ó hAilpín	Hurling	All-Ireland- winning captain with Cork and winner of a third All-Ireland medal.	
2006	Henry Shefflin	Hurling	Won his fourth All-Ireland medal with Kilkenny as well as being named Hurler of the Year for a second time.	
2007	Pádraig Harrington	Golf	Became the first Irishman in over sixty years to win the Open Championship.	
2008	Pádraig Harrington	Golf	Retained his Open Championship, thus becoming the first European to win back to back major championships.	
2009	Brian O'Driscoll	Rugby union	Grand Slam-winning captain and member of the Leinster team that won the 2008–09 Heineken Cup	
2010	Graeme McDowell	Golf	Winner of the 2010 US Open and member of the European team that won the 2010 Ryder Cup.	
2011	Rory McIlroy	Golf	Winner of the 2011 US Open.	
2012	Katie Taylor	Boxing	Olympic gold medallist in the women's lightweight section at the 2012 London Olympic Games.	
2013	Tony McCoy	Horse racing	18-times champion jockey who created history in November when he rode his 4,000th winner over jumps.	
2014	Rory McIlroy	Golf	Won the 2014 Open Championship and 2014 PGA Championship, became the first European to win three different majors, and was a member of the European team that won the 2014 Ryder Cup.	
2015	Michael Conlan	Boxing	Won the gold medal in the bantamweight division at the 2015 AIBA World Boxing Championships.	
2016	Conor McGregor	Mixed martial arts	Became the first fighter in UFC history to hold titles in two divisions simultaneously.	
2017	James McClean	Soccer	Scored one of Ireland's most famous goals when he netted to secure a 1-0 win away to Wales, which secured a 2018 FIFA World Cup playoff spot.	
2018	Johnny Sexton	Rugby union	Won a Six Nations Grand Slam with Ireland, a Pro14-Champions Cup double with Leinster and was named World Rugby Player of the Year.	
2019	Shane Lowry	Golf	Winner of the 148th Open Championship at Royal Portrush Golf Club.	
2020	Katie Taylor	Boxing	Successfully defended her undisputed lightweight belts after defeating Delfine Persoon and Miriam Gutiérrez.	
2021	Rachael Blackmore	Horse racing	The first woman to win the Grand National and the first to claim the leading rider title at the Cheltenham Festival.	
2022	Katie Taylor	Boxing	Successfully defended her undisputed lightweight belts after defeating Amanda Serrano in a historic fight at Madison Square Garden, and also beating Karen Carabajal.	
2023	Rhys McClenaghan	Gymnastics	McClenaghan won a second European title and retained the world title in the 2023 European Artistic Gymnastics Championships. Entered Olympic year as reigning World, European and Commonwealth Games champion in the pommel horse.	
2024	Paul O'Donovan	Rowing	O'Donovan won a second Olympic gold medal and third Olympic Medal in a row alongside Fintan McCarthy, making him the first Irish athlete to win three consecutive Olympic medals and the most successful Irish Olympian. He also won a World title in the lightweight Single Sculls	
2025	Rory McIlroy	Golf	McIlroy became the first Irish winner of the Masters and completing the career grand slam becoming the 6th place ever to do so and first European. He also won the Irish Open, The Ryder Cup and 3 PGA Tour wins.	

=== Gallery ===
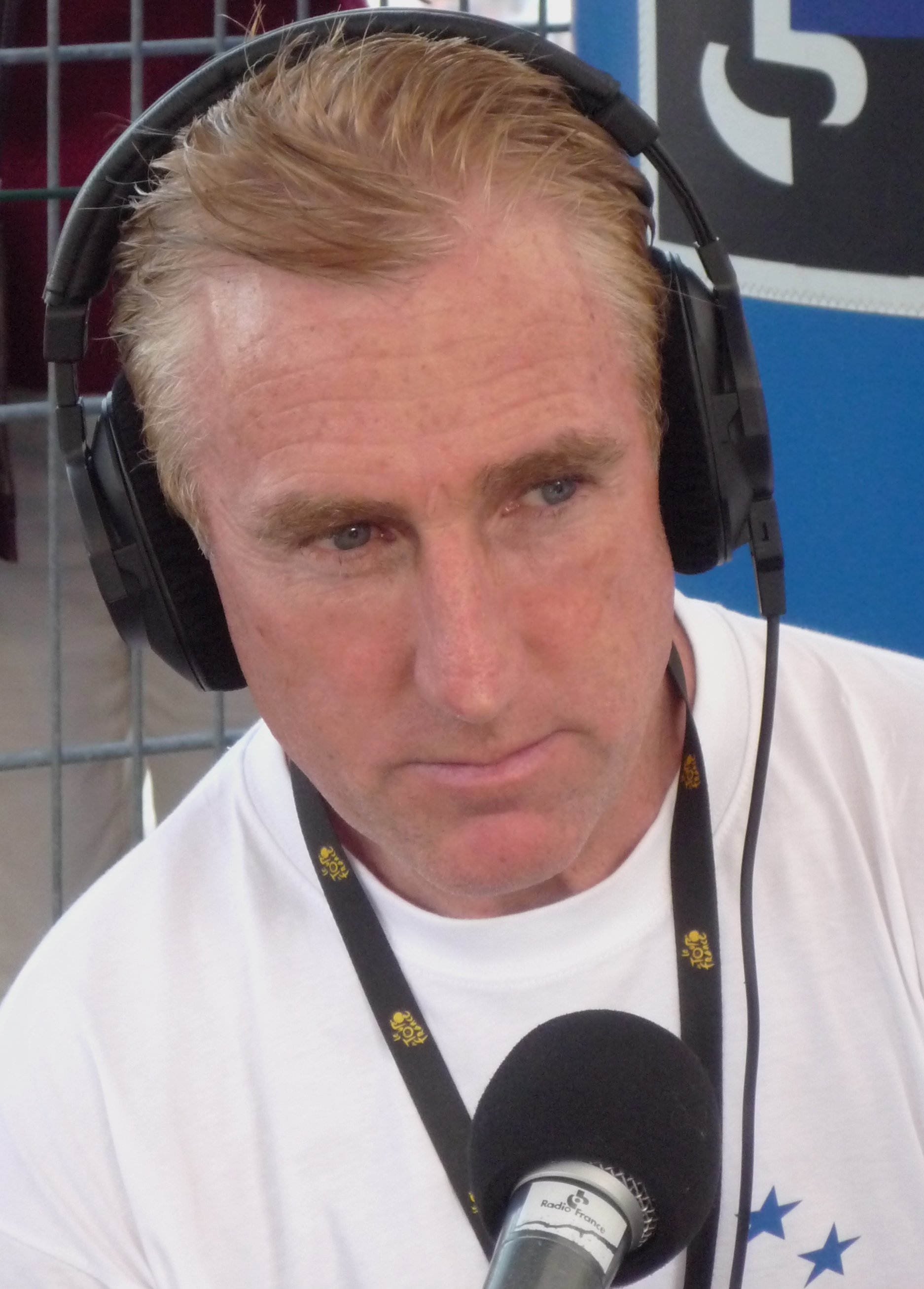
Seán Kelly won in 1986.

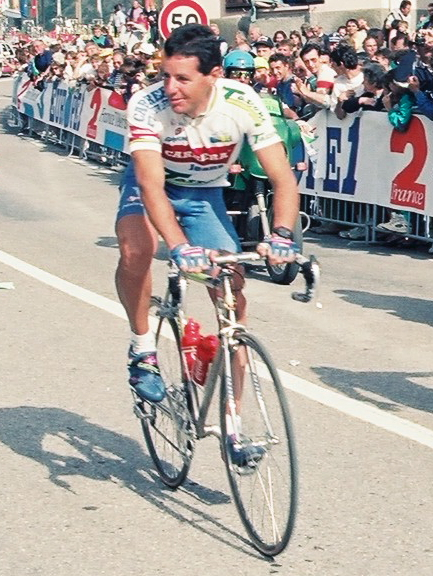
Stephen Roche won in 1987.

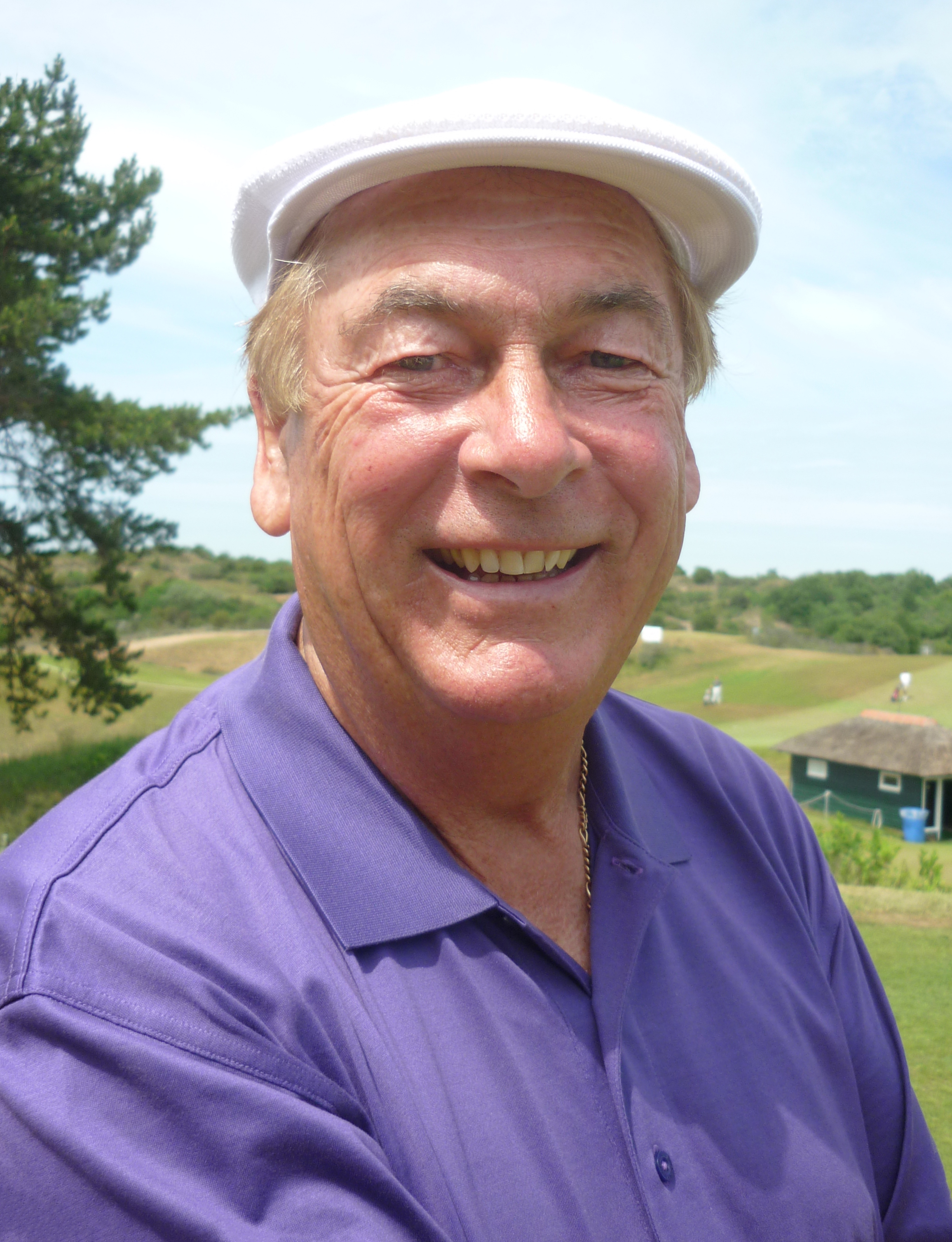
Christy O'Connor Jnr won in 1989.

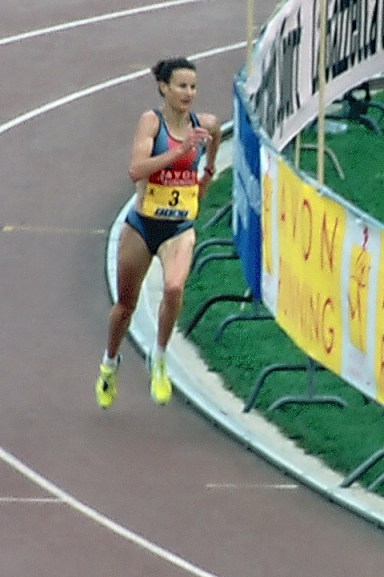
Sonia O'Sullivan won in 1993, 1994, 1995, 1998 and 2000.

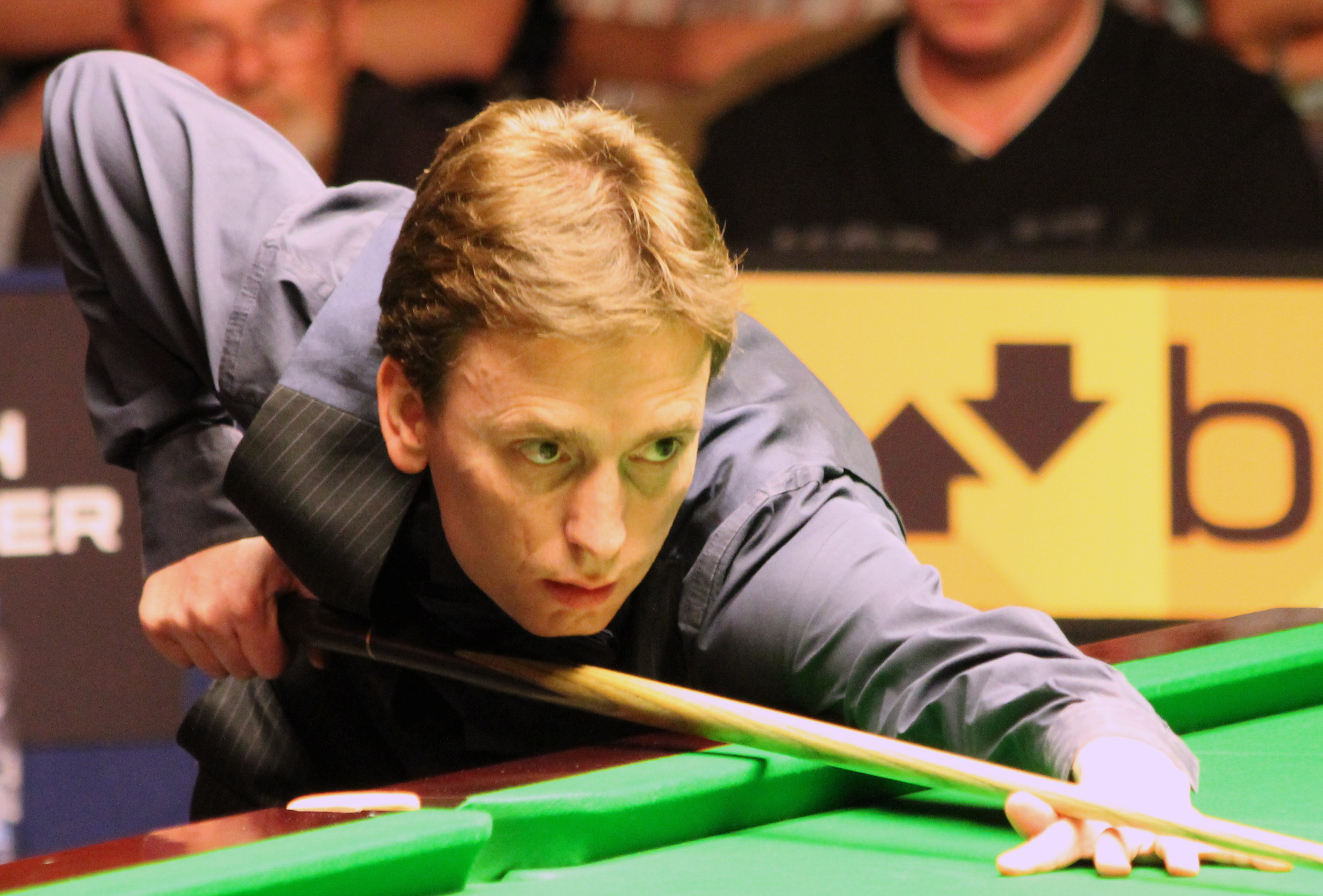
Ken Doherty won in 1997.

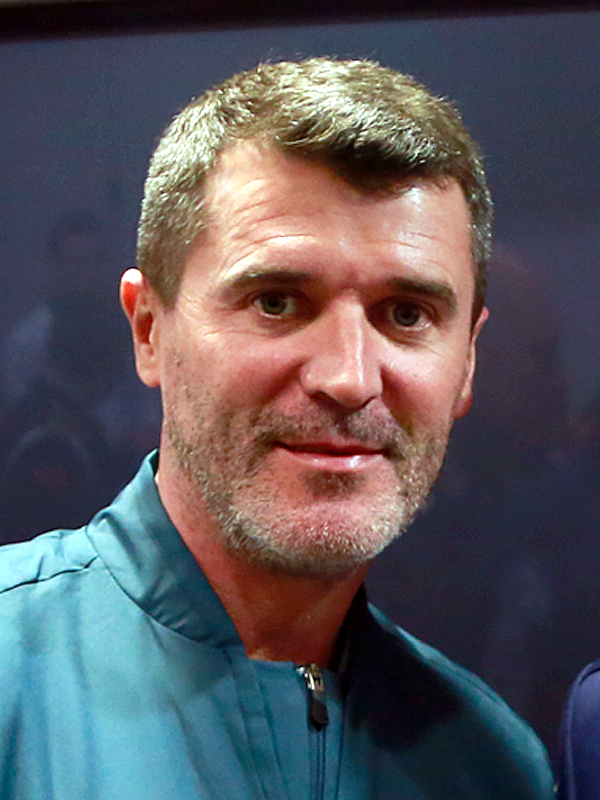
Roy Keane won in 1999.

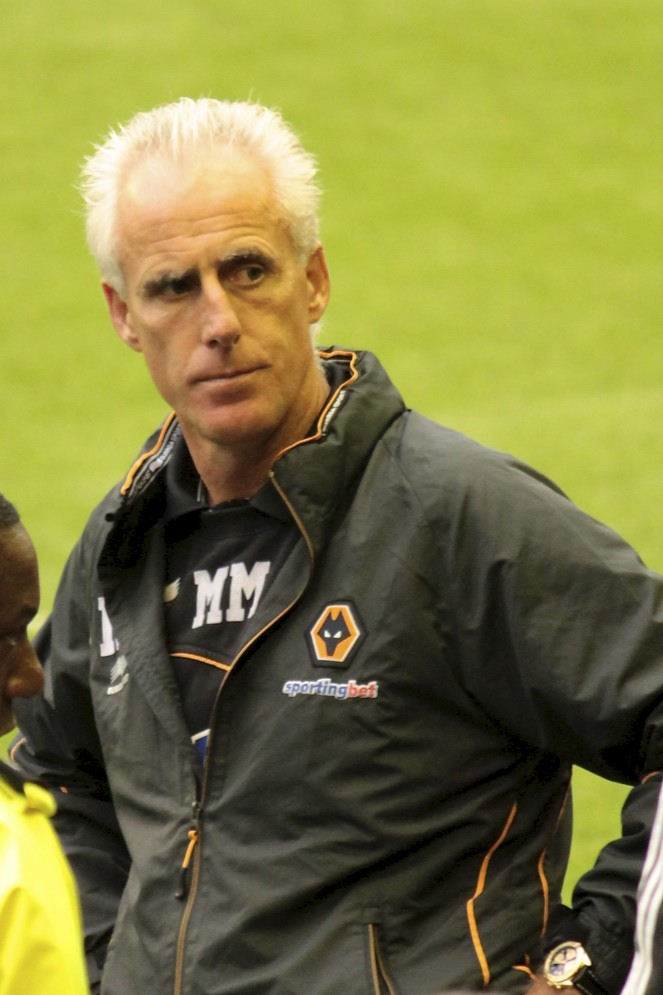
Mick McCarthy won in 2001.

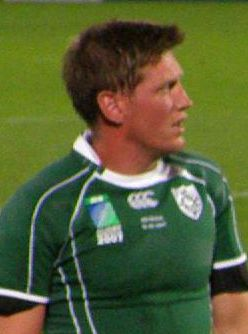
Ronan O'Gara won in 2004.

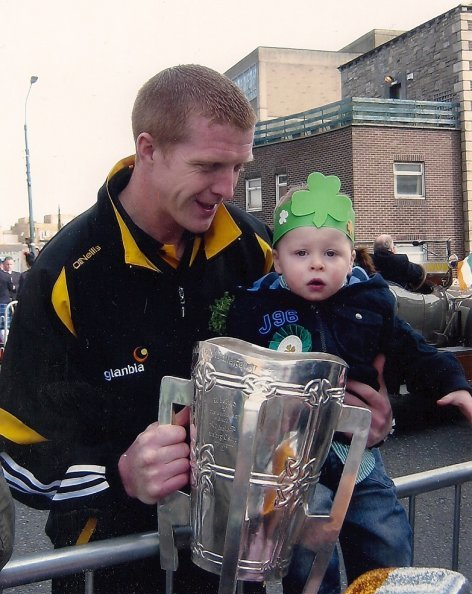
Henry Shefflin won in 2006.

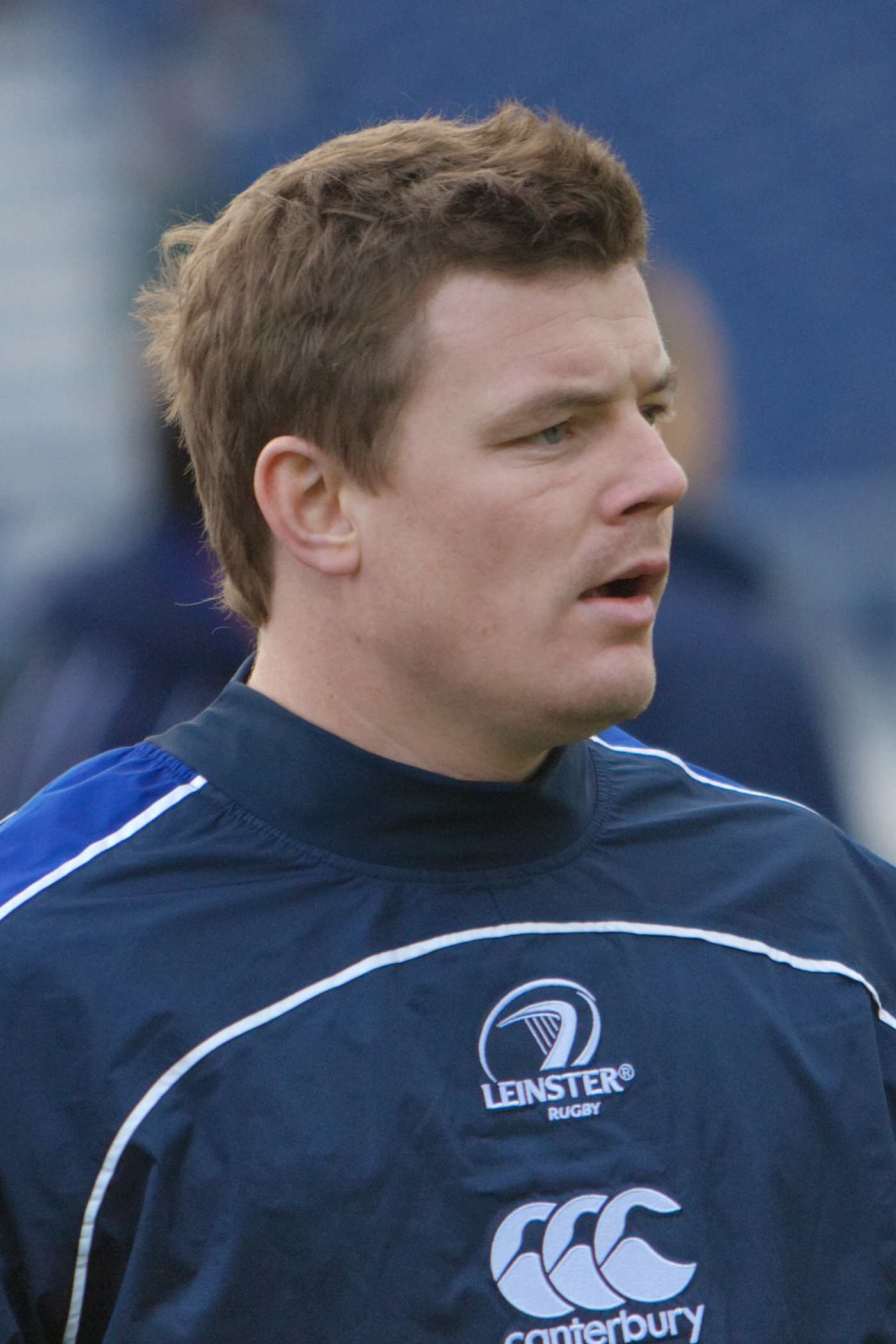
Brian O'Driscoll won in 2009.

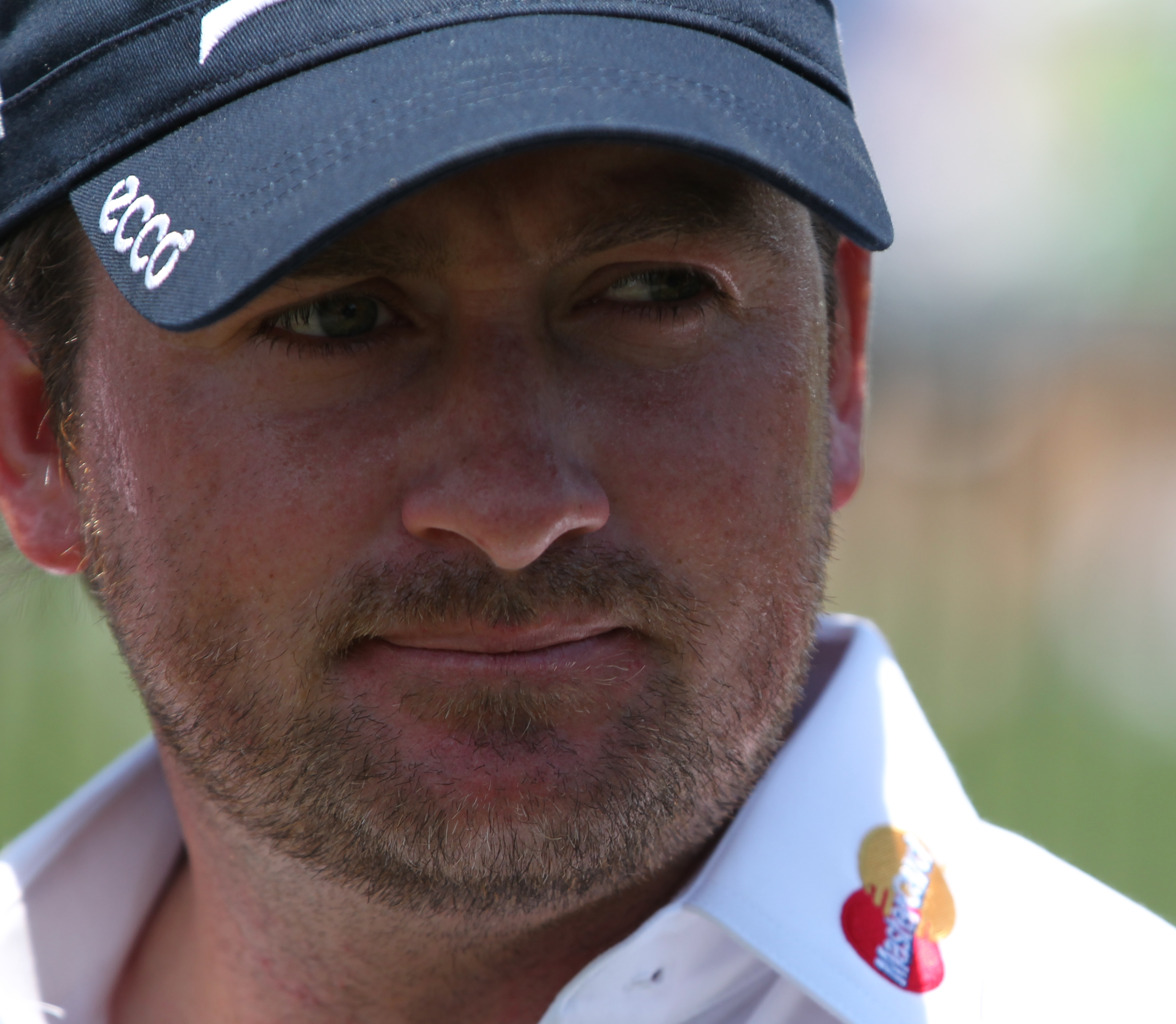
Graeme McDowell won in 2010.

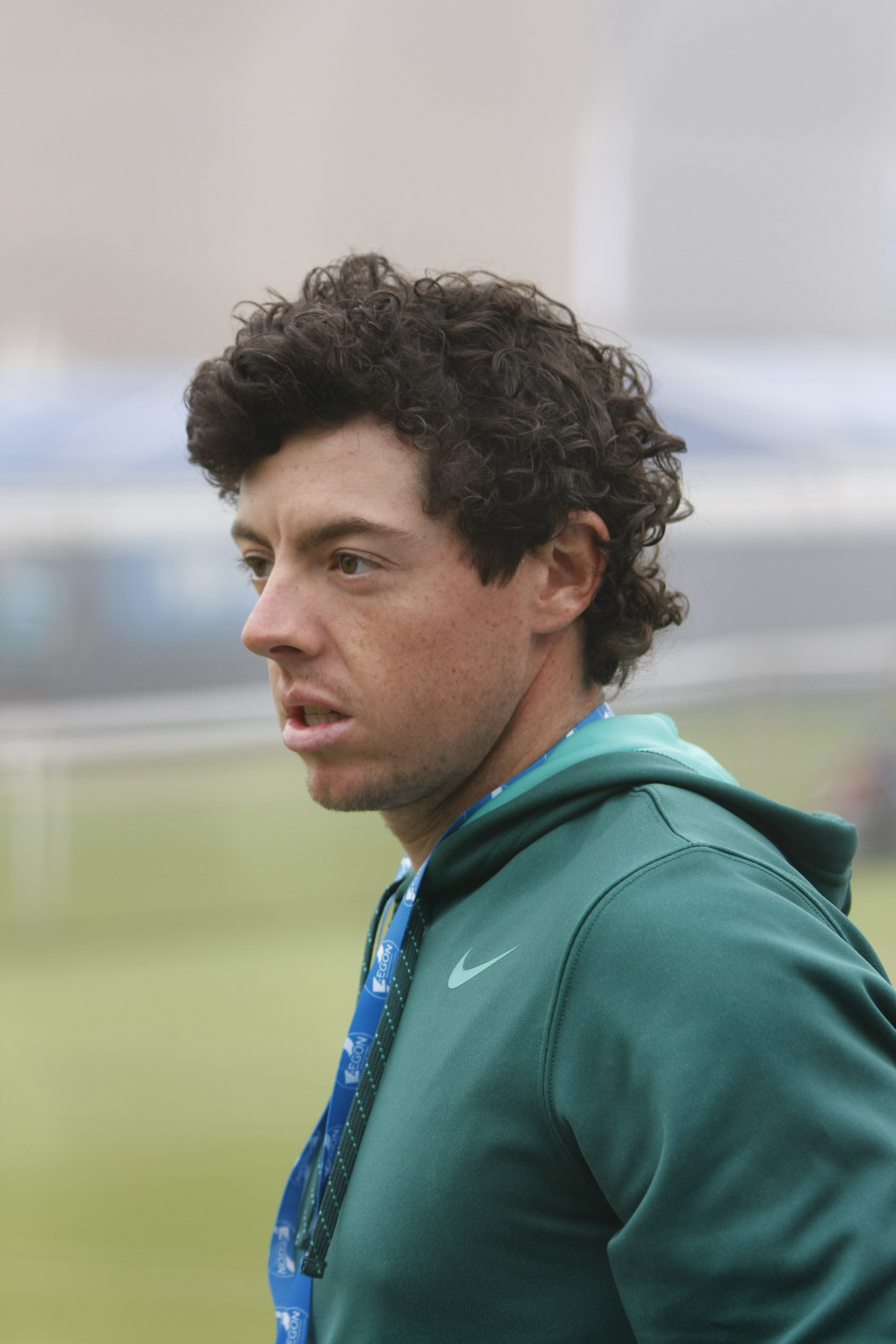
Rory McIlroy won in 2011, 2014 and 2025.

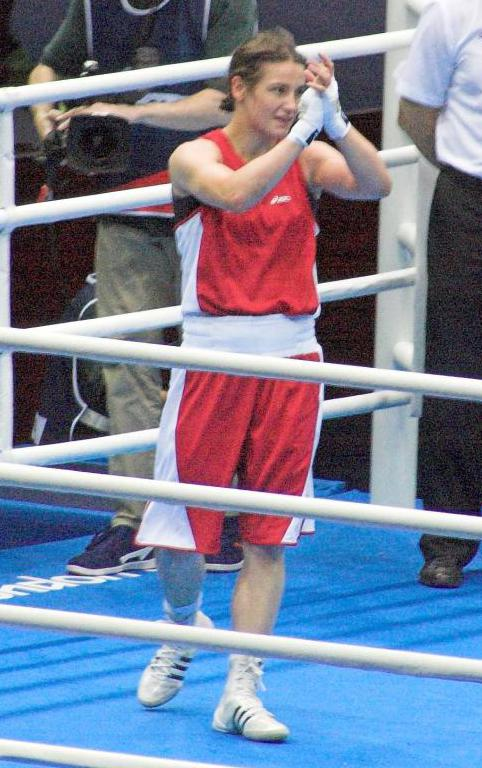
Katie Taylor won in 2012, 2020 and 2022.

A. P. "Tony" McCoy won in 2013.

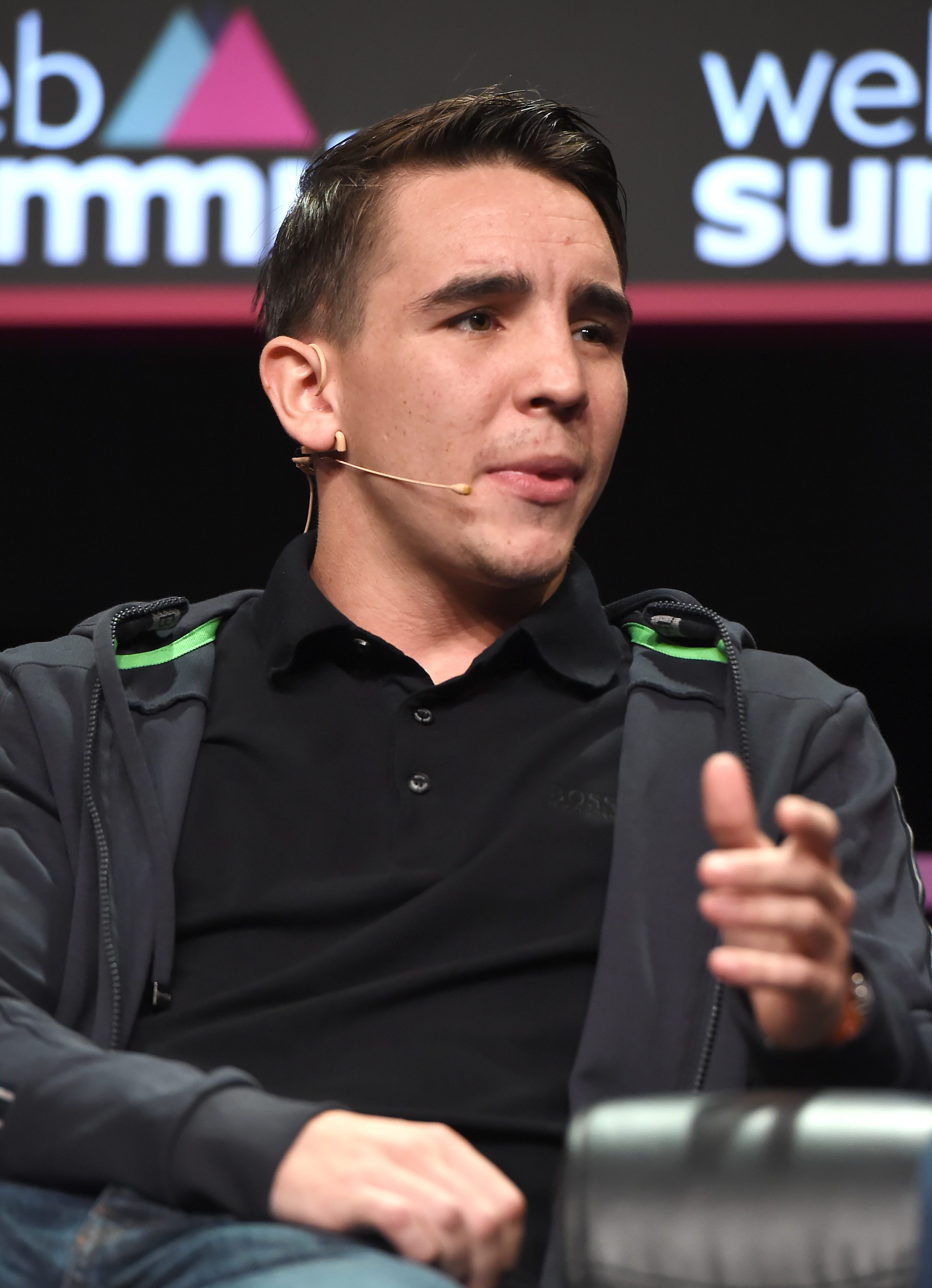
Michael Conlan won in 2015.

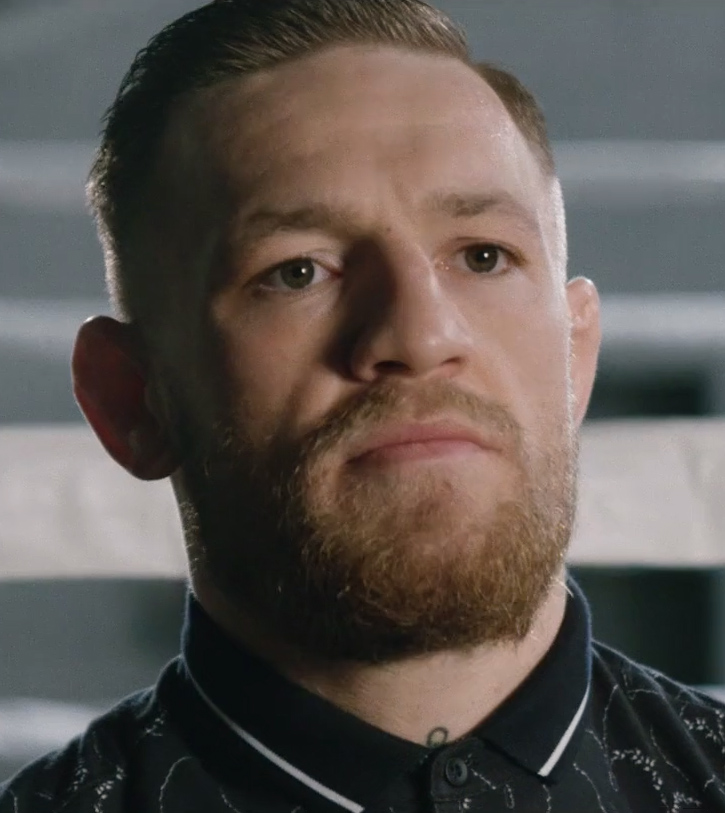
Conor McGregor won in 2016.

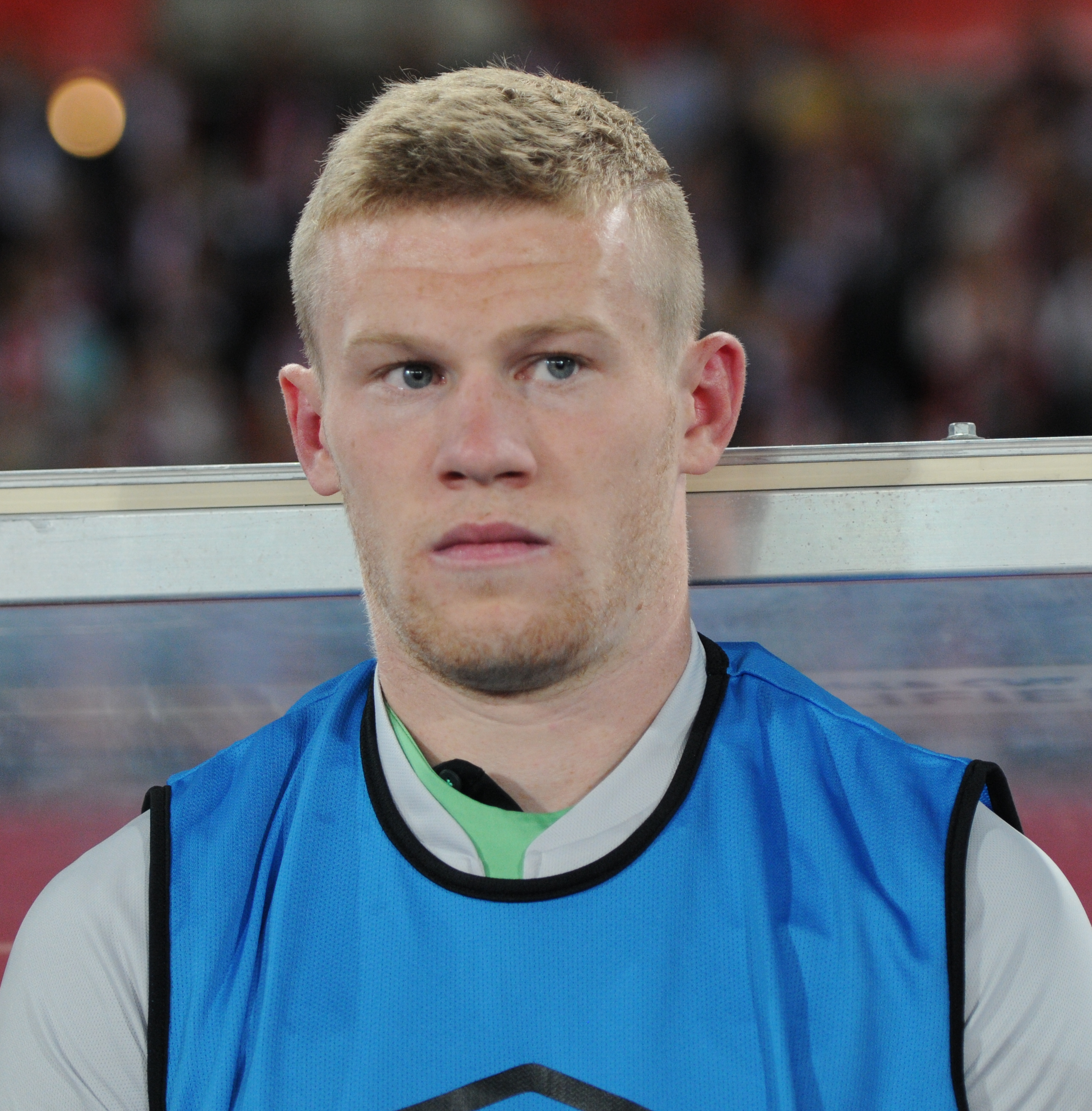
James McClean won in 2017.

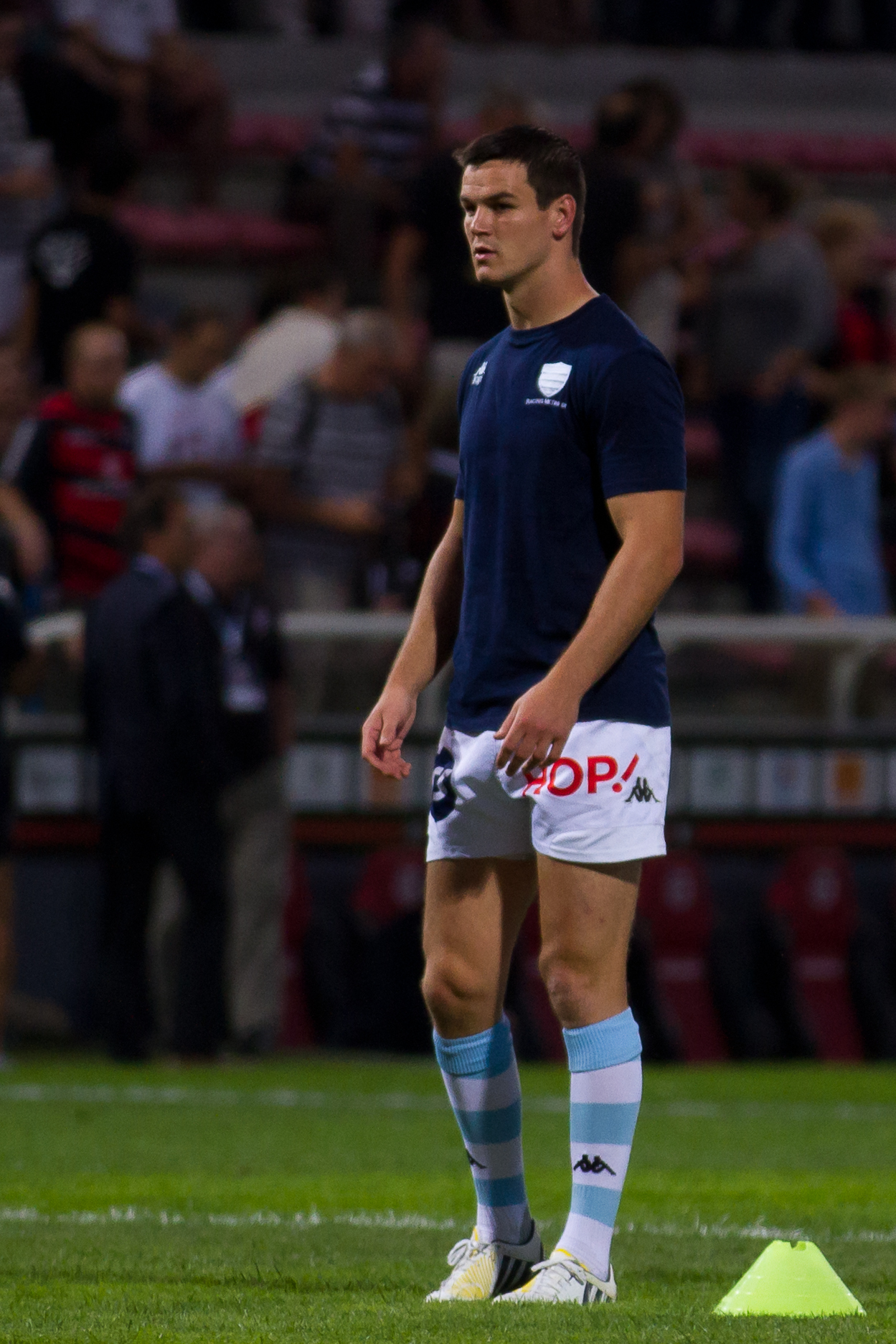
Johnny Sexton won in 2018.

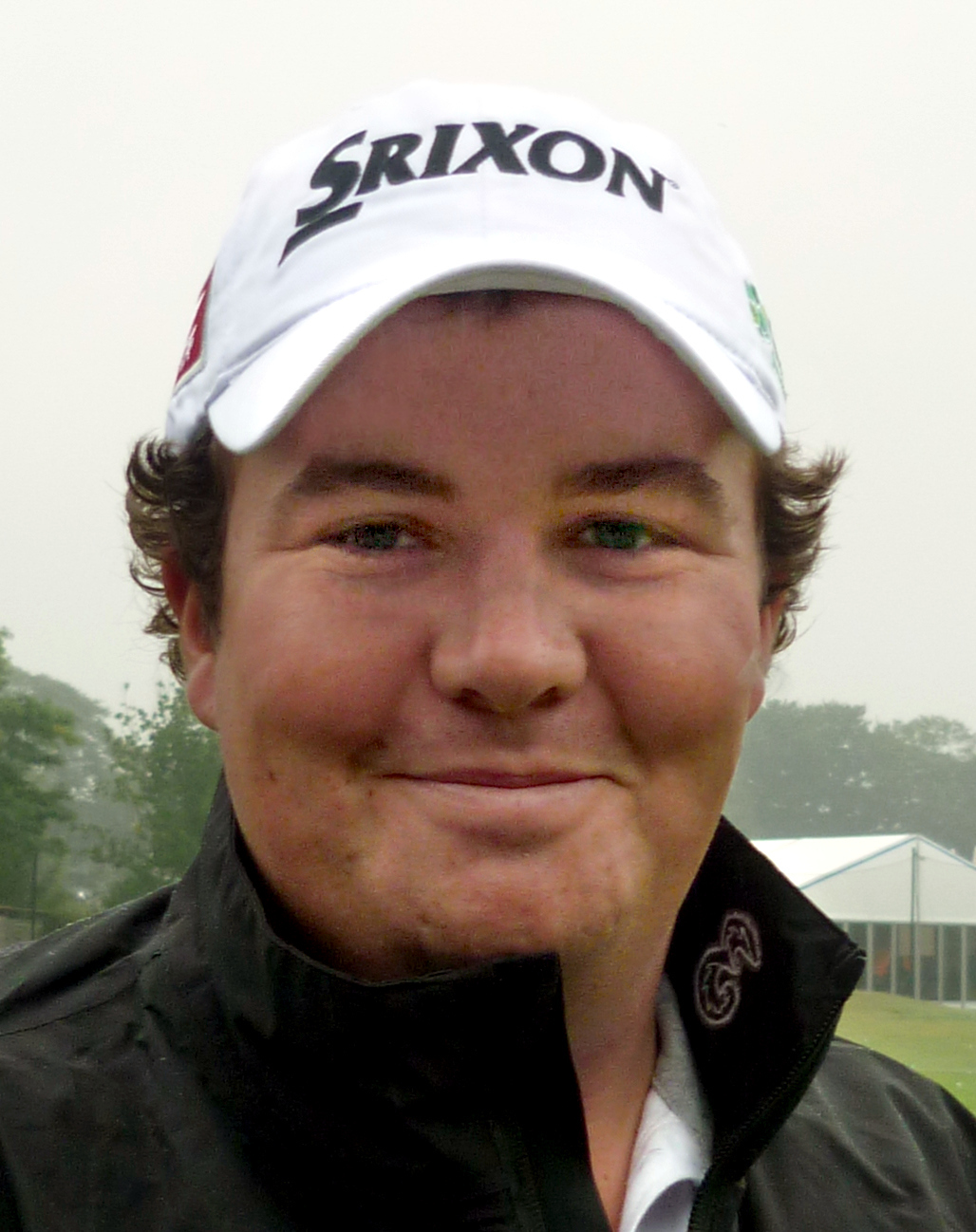
Shane Lowry won in 2019.

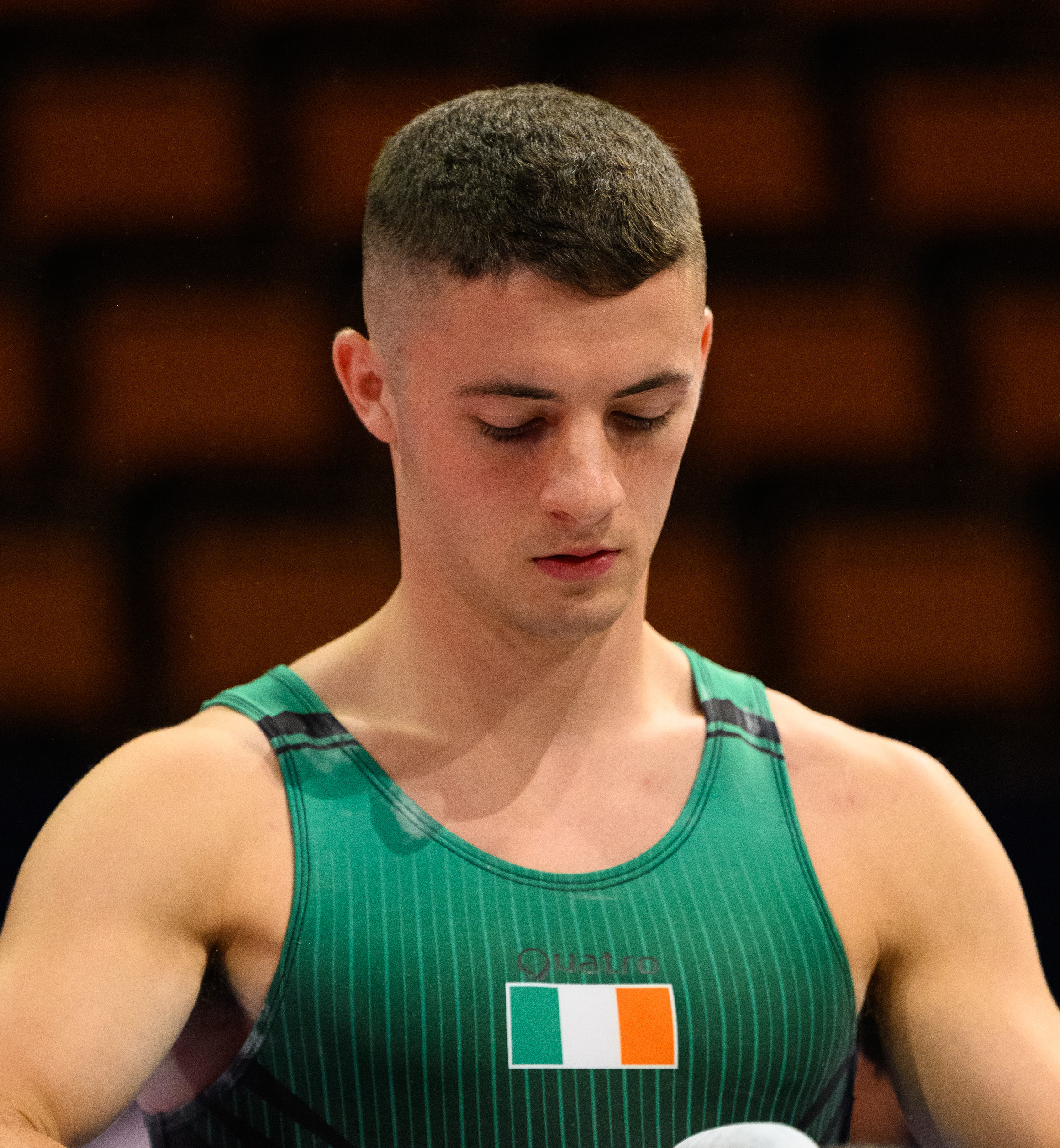
Rhys McClenaghan won in 2023.

=== By number of wins ===
This table lists those who have won more than once (ordered by the most wins, with the earliest win acting as a tie-breaker).

Accurate up-to and including the 2025 award.

Multiple winners
Winner	Number of wins
Sonia O'Sullivan	5
Pádraig Harrington	3
Katie Taylor	3
Rory McIlroy	3

=== By sport ===
This table lists the total number of awards won by the winner's sport (ordered by number of wins, with the earliest win acting as a tie-breaker). The 3 winners in 1988 (all golfers) are counted separately.

Accurate up-to and including the 2025 award.

Winners by sport
Sport	Number of wins
Golf	12
Boxing	6
Athletics	5
Soccer	4
Rugby union	4
Horse racing	3
Cycling	2
Hurling	2
Swimming	1
Snooker	1
Mixed martial arts	1
Gymnastics	1
Rowing	1
Total	42

=== By disability ===
So far (as of the 2022 awards) all winners have been able-bodied athletes, but para athletes among the nominees have included,

- Jason Smyth (Para Athletics) in 2012 to 2014, 2017 to 2019, and 2021
- Katie George Dunlevy and Eve McCrystal (para cycling) in 2016, 2017 and 2024
- Róisín Ní Ríain (Para Swimming) in 2024, 2025 and 2026,
- Ronan Grimes (Para Cycling) 2022.
- Orla Comerford (Para Athletics) 2025
- Ellen Keane (Swimming) 2021

== 2010s winners and nominees ==
The winner is in bold.

=== 2010 ===
- Katie Taylor (boxing)
- **Graeme McDowell** (golf)
- Gráinne Murphy (swimming)
- Tony McCoy (horse racing)
- Lar Corbett (hurling)
- Paddy Barnes (boxing)
- Tommy Bowe (rugby union)
- Derval O'Rourke (athletics)
- Rory McIlroy (golf)

=== 2011 ===
- Darren Clarke (golf)
- Michael Fennelly (hurling)
- Seán O'Brien (rugby union)
- Katie Taylor (boxing)
- **Rory McIlroy** (golf)
- John Joe Nevin (boxing)
- Kevin O'Brien (cricket)
- Alan Brogan (Gaelic football)
- Robbie Keane (soccer)

=== 2012 ===
- Fionnuala Britton (athletics)
- Rob Kearney (rugby union)
- Karl Lacey (Gaelic football)
- Rory McIlroy (golf)
- Michael McKillop (athletics)
- Joseph O'Brien (horse racing)
- Mark Rohan (cycling)
- Henry Shefflin (hurling)
- Jason Smyth (para athletics)
- **Katie Taylor** (boxing)

=== 2013 ===
- Robert Heffernan (athletics)
- Martyn Irvine (cycling)
- Tony Kelly (hurling)
- Michael Darragh MacAuley (Gaelic football)
- **Tony McCoy** (horse racing)
- Michael McKillop (athletics)
- Annalise Murphy (sailing)
- Joseph O'Brien (horse racing)
- Jason Quigley (boxing)
- Johnny Sexton (rugby union)
- Jason Smyth (para athletics)

=== 2014 ===
- Niamh Briggs (rugby union)
- Seamus Coleman (soccer)
- Briege Corkery (camogie and ladies' Gaelic football)
- Mark English (athletics)
- Carl Frampton (boxing)
- **Rory McIlroy** (golf)
- Michael McKillop (athletics)
- James O'Donoghue (Gaelic football)
- Johnny Sexton (rugby union)
- Jason Smyth (para athletics)
- Richie Hogan (hurling)
- Katie Taylor (boxing)

=== 2015 ===
- **Michael Conlan** (boxing)
- Leighton Aspell (horse racing)
- Rena Buckley (camogie)
- Andy Lee (boxing)
- Shane Lowry (golf)
- Jack McCaffrey (Gaelic football)
- Rory McIlroy (golf)
- Michael McKillop (athletics)
- Paul O'Connell (rugby union)
- TJ Reid (hurling)
- Sophie Spence (rugby union)
- Richie Towell (soccer)
- Jon Walters (soccer)
- Conor McGregor (MMA)

=== 2016 ===
- Séamus Callanan (hurling)
- Eoghan Clifford (cycling)
- Katie-George Dunlevy & Eve McCrystal (para cycling)
- Denise Gaule (camogie)
- Brian Fenton (Gaelic football)
- Carl Frampton (boxing)
- Daryl Horgan (soccer)
- Annalise Murphy (sailing)
- **Conor McGregor** (MMA)
- Paul O'Donovan (rowing)
- Jamie Heaslip (rugby union)
- Bríd Stack (ladies' Gaelic football)

=== 2017 ===
- Rena Buckley (Camogie)
- Ryan Burnett (Boxing)
- Joe Canning (Hurling)
- Katie George Dunlevy and Eve McCrystal (para cycling)
- Noëlle Healy (Ladies' Gaelic Football)
- **James McClean** (Soccer)
- Michael McKillop (Athletics)
- Andy Moran (Gaelic Football)
- Conor Murray (Rugby)
- Paul O'Donovan (Rowing)
- Robbie Power (Horse racing)
- Jason Smyth (Para athletics)
- Katie Taylor (Boxing)
- Joe Ward (Boxing)

=== 2018 ===
- Sinéad Aherne (Ladies' Gaelic Football)
- Thomas Barr (Athletics)
- Brian Fenton (Gaelic Football)
- Kellie Harrington (Boxing)
- Ellen Keane (Swimming)
- Cian Lynch (Hurling)
- Rhys McClenaghan (Gymnastics)
- Ayeisha McFerran (Hockey)
- Sanita Pušpure (Rowing)
- Davy Russell (Horse racing)
- **Johnny Sexton** (Rugby)
- Jason Smyth (Para athletics)
- Katie Taylor (Boxing)

=== 2019 ===
- Séamus Callanan (Hurling)
- Stephen Cluxton (Gaelic Football)
- Niamh Kilkenny (Camogie)
- **Shane Lowry** (Golf)
- Ciara Mageean (Athletics)
- Rhys McClenaghan (Gymnastics)
- Denise O'Sullivan (Soccer)
- Sanita Pušpure (Rowing)
- Jason Smyth (Para athletics)
- Katie Taylor (Boxing)

== 2020s winners and nominees ==
The winner is in bold.

=== 2020 ===
- Sanita Pušpure (Rowing)
- Sam Bennett (Cycling)
- **Katie Taylor** (Boxing)
- Ciarán Kilkenny (Gaelic Football)
- Gearóid Hegarty (Hurling)
- Colin Keane (Horse Racing)

=== 2021 ===
- **Rachael Blackmore** (Horse Racing)
- Kellie Harrington (Boxing)
- Ellen Keane (Swimming)
- Cian Lynch (Hurling)
- Leona Maguire (Golf)
- Jason Smyth (Para athletics)
- Katie Taylor (Boxing)
- Vikki Wall (Gaelic football)

=== 2022 ===
- **Katie Taylor** (Boxing)
- Rachael Blackmore (Horse Racing)
- Amy Broadhurst (Boxing)
- Katie McCabe (Soccer)
- Rhys McClenaghan (Gymnastics)
- Rory McIlroy (Golf)
- Ciara Mageean (Athletics)
- Ronan Grimes (Para Cycling)
- David Clifford (Gaelic football)
- Josh van der Flier (Rugby)

=== 2023 ===
- **Rhys McClenaghan** (Gymnastics)
- Johnny Sexton (Rugby)
- Katie Taylor (Boxing)
- Paul Townend (Horse Racing)
- Katie McCabe (Soccer)
- Aaron Gillane (Hurling)
- Róisín Ní Riain (Para swimming)

=== 2024 ===
- Rhys McClenaghan (Gymnastics)
- Kellie Harrington (Boxing)
- Daniel Wiffen (Swimming)
- Ciara Mageean (Athletics)
- Shane O'Donnell (Hurling)
- Katie-George Dunlevy (Para Cycling)
- Katie Taylor (Boxing)
- Paul Townend (Horse Racing)
- Anthony Cacace (Boxing)
- **Paul O'Donovan** (Rowing)
- Rhasidat Adeleke (Athletics)
- Róisín Ní Riain (Para swimming)

=== 2025 ===
- Aoife O'Rourke (Boxing)
- Ben Healy (Cycling)
- David Clifford (Gaelic Football)
- Fiona Murtagh (Rowing)
- Katie McCabe (Soccer)
- Kate O'Connor (Athletics)
- Lara Gillespie (Cycling)
- Orla Comerford (Para Athletics)
- **Rory McIlroy** (Golf)
- Róisín Ní Riain (Para Swimming)
- Sarah Healy (Athletics)
- Troy Parrott (Soccer)

== Young Sportsperson of the Year ==
Year	Winner	Sport	Sporting synopsis
2017	Mona McSharry	Swimming	Gold and Bronze medals at the 2017 World Junior Swimming Championships.
2018	Rhys McClenaghan	Gymnastics	Won Gold on the Pommel Horse at the Commonwealth Games and the European Gymnastics Championships.
2019	Rhys McClenaghan	Gymnastics	Won a Bronze medal at the World Championships becoming the first Irish gymnast to win a medal at the World Championships.
2020	Oisin O'Callaghan	Mountain Biking	World Junior Champion after winning Gold at the 2020 Mountain Bike World Championships in Austria.
2021	Gavin Bazunu	Soccer	The 19 year old became Ireland's first choice goalkeeper and saved Cristiano Ronaldo's penalty in Ireland's World Cup Qualifier against Portugal.
2022	Rhasidat Adeleke	Athletics	Finish 5th in the 400m at the European Championships in Munich breaking her own Irish Record
2023	Evan Ferguson	Soccer	The Brighton Striker became the youngest Irish player to score a hat-trick in the Premier League and only the fifth 18 year old to achieve that feat.
2024	Róisín Ní Ríain	Para Swimming	2024 Paralympic Games Silver and Bronze medalist in Swimming also came fourth in her two other events.
2025	John Shortt	Swimming	Double Gold medalist at the 2025 World Junior Swimming Championships also won Bronze and two more European Junior medal including one Gold.

=== 2017 ===
- Gina Akpe-Moses (Athletics)
- David Clifford (Gaelic Football)
- Mona McSharry (Swimming)

=== 2018 ===
- Rhasidat Adeleke (Athletics)
- David Clifford (Gaelic Football)
- Niamh Coyne (Swimming)
- Sean Crean (Karate)
- Lara Gillespie (Cycling)
- Kyle Hayes (Hurling)
- Sarah Healy (Athletics)
- Sommer Lecky (Athletics)
- Rhys McClenaghan (Gymnastics)
- Daina Moorehouse (Boxing)
- Donnacha O'Brien (Horse Racing)
- Nicole Turner (Para Swimming)
- Derbhla Rooney (Boxing)

=== 2019 ===
- Rhasidat Adeleke (Athletics)
- Craig Casey (Rugby)
- Aaron Connolly (Soccer)
- Niamh Fay (Boxing)
- Lara Gillespie (Cycling)
- Sarah Healy (Athletics)
- Rhys McClenaghan (Gymnastics)
- Mona McSharry (Swimming)
- Adrian Mullen (Hurling)
- Kate O'Connor (Athletics)
- Nicole Turner (Para Swimming)

=== 2020 ===
- Aaron Hill (Snooker)
- Katelynn Phelan (Boxing)
- Keane Barry (Darts)
- Oisin Mullin (Gaelic Football)
- Oisin O'Callaghan (Mountain Biking)

=== 2021 ===
- Amy Hunter (Cricket)
- Emma Duggan (Gaelic football)
- Gavin Bazunu (Soccer)
- Lara Gillespie (Cycling)
- Nicole Turner (Para Swimming)
- Rhasidat Adeleke (Athletics)

=== 2022 ===
- Rhasidat Adeleke (Athletics)
- James Culhane (Rugby)
- Eve McMahon (Sailing)
- Israel Olatunde (Athletics)
- Lisa O'Rourke (Boxing)

=== 2023 ===
- Brian Gleeson (Rugby)
- Elizabeth Ndudi (Athletics)
- Nick Griggs (Athletics)
- Eve McMahon (Sailing)
- Evan Ferguson (Soccer)
- Roisin Ní Ríain (Para Swimming)

=== 2024 ===
- Lucy Benezet Minns (Cycling)
- Kyla Doyle (Boxing)
- Oisin Joyce (Athletics)
- Eve McMahon (Sailing)
- Adam Olanyian (Boxing)
- Roisin Ní Ríain (Para Swimming)

=== 2025 ===
- Alex Dunne (Motorsport)
- Conor Kelly (Athletics)
- John Shortt (Swimmer)
- Michael Noonan (Soccer)
- Patsy Joyce (Boxing)
- Roisin Ní Ríain (Para Swimming)
- Sean Butterly (Canoe Sprint)
