= Vaimooia Ripley =

Samoan competitive sailor

Sport
- Country: Samoa
- Sport: Sailing
Medal record
Women's Sailing
Representing Samoa
Pacific Games
Gold medal – first place	2019 Apia	Team Laser Radial

Vaimo'oi'a Astrid Ripley (born ~1990) is a Samoan competitive sailor who was the first female Samoan sailor to compete in the Olympic Games.

Ripley was born in Samoa and has been sailing since the age of eight. She competed at the 2007 Pacific Games when she was 17. At the 2019 Pacific Games in Apia she came 6th in the individual Laser Radial, but won gold (alongside Bianca Leilua) in the team competition. In 2021 she attended the 2021 Laser Radial World Championships in Al-Musannah, Oman. In February 2022 she finished third in the NSW/ACT State Masters Championships.

Ripley also plays touch rugby and was part of the Samoan team attending the 2019 Touch Rugby World Cup in Putrajaya, Malaysia.

In 2024 she qualified for the 2024 Summer Olympics, becoming the first female Samoan sailor to compete in the Olympic Games. Following the Olympics she competed in Australia, and at the 2026 Oceania sailing championships in Tahiti.
