= Sophia Morgan =

Fijian sailor

Personal information
- Full name: Sophia Frances Morgan
- Born: 5 August 2003 (age 22) Fiji

Sailing career
- Sport: Sailing
- Classes: Laser Radial; Starling
Medal record
Sailing
Representing Fiji
Pacific Games
Silver medal – second place	2019 Apia	Laser Radial team
Silver medal – second place	2023 Honiara	Laser Radial individual
Silver medal – second place	2023 Honiara	Laser Radial team

Sophia Frances Morgan (born 5 August 2003) is a Fijian sailor, who came second in the Women's Laser Radial team event at the 2019 Pacific Games, and the individual and team events at the 2023 Pacific Games. She competed in the laser radial event at the delayed 2020 Summer Olympics, and has qualified for the 2024 Summer Olympics.

== Personal life ==
Morgan grew up in Lami, Fiji, and as a youngster, she played football in Rewa. Morgan moved to New Zealand for high school. She has studied at Epsom Girls' Grammar School in Auckland, New Zealand. and later biomedicine at the University of Auckland. Her father is also a sailor.

== Career ==
Morgan started sailing at the Royal Suva Yacht Club. She moved to New Zealand to compete in higher-level sailing events. She came second in the Women's Laser Radial team event at the 2019 Pacific Games, alongside Nelle Leenders. In January 2020, she competed at the joint Australian and Oceania Championships, and the Australian Youth Championships.

At the 2020 Women's Laser Radial World Championship, Morgan was the best place sailor from the Oceania region. As a result, she qualified for the 2020 Summer Olympics. She participated in the laser radial event, and was the only Fijian sailor at the Games. After qualifying for the Olympics, Morgan was invited to train with the New Zealand Youth sailing squad. She also received a scholarship from the International Olympic Committee to fund her appearance at the Games. In March 2020, Morgan came third in a college schools Starling class event.

In January 2021, she came second in the youth event at the New Zealand Laser National Championships, and in April, she came second in the Girl's Youth Laser Radial event at the Oceanbridge NZL Sailing Regatta. In May, she was the third woman, and seventh overall, at the NSFW Laser Championships. She came third in two races at the event. At the Olympics, Morgan finished 42nd overall.

Morgan was given an International Olympic Committee scholarship to aid her attempt to qualify for the 2024 Summer Olympics in Paris. At the 2023 Pacific Games, she finished second in the individual and team events, and in December 2023, she was confirmed as qualified for the Olympics.
