= Eroni Leilua =

Samoan sailor (born 1993)

Personal information
- Nationality: Samoan
- Born: 15 April 1993 (age 33)

Sport
- Sport: Sailing
- Coached by: Ian Neelly
Medal record
Men's Sailing
Representing Samoa
Pacific Games
Silver medal – second place	2019 Apia	Team Laser Radial
Bronze medal – third place	2011 Nouméa	Team Laser

Eroni Leilua (born 15 April 1993) is a Samoan sailor. He competed in the Laser event at the 2020 Summer Olympics, becoming the first Samoan to represent the country in that event.

== Biography ==
Leilua is from Vaivase Uta in Upolu. He grew up in Samoa but moved to Auckland, New Zealand at the age of 12 with his family. He subsequently studied commerce and physical education at the University of Otago.

He represented Samoa at two Pacific Games and a world sailing championship before competing in the 2020 Tokyo Olympics. At the 2011 Pacific Games in Nouméa he won bronze (alongside Myka Stanley) in the team laser competition. At the 2019 Pacific Games in Apia he came fourth in the individual Laser Radial, but won gold (alongside Nicky Touli) in the men's team competition.
