= Lance Woolridge =

South African rally driver

- Nationality: (South Africa) South African
- Born: 30 July 1991 (age 35) Pietermaritzburg, South Africa

Extreme E career
- Debut season: 2021
- Current team: Veloce Racing
- Car number: 5
- Co-driver: Christine GZ
- Starts: 1
- Wins: 0
- Podiums: 0
- Poles: 0
- Best finish: 12th in 2021

Lance Woolridge (born 30 July 1991) is a South African rally driver.

A two-time Class T champion in the South African Cross Country Series, Woolridge was signed by Veloce Racing as reserve driver for the inaugural season of the new electric off-road racing series Extreme E in 2021. He made his series debut at the season-ending Jurassic X-Prix in Dorset, replacing Stéphane Sarrazin, and was subsequently promoted to full-time driver for 2022 alongside Christine GZ.

== Racing record ==
=== Complete Extreme E results ===
(key)

Year	Team	Car	1	2	3	4	5	6	7	8	9	10	Pos.	Points
2021	Veloce Racing	Spark ODYSSEY 21	DES; Q	DES; R	OCE; Q	OCE; R	ARC; Q	ARC; R	ISL; Q	ISL; R	JUR; Q 6	JUR; R 6	12th	17
2022	Veloce Racing	Spark ODYSSEY 21	DES; 10	ISL1; 8	ISL2; 9	COP; 10	ENE						17th	8
