= 2022 Copper X-Prix =

Round 4 of 5 of the 2022 Extreme E Championship
← Previous race	Next race →

Race details
- Date: 24–25 September 2022
- Official name: 2022 Antofagasta Minerals Copper X-Prix
- Location: Calama, Chile
- Course: Rocks, gravel
- Course length: 3.05 km (1.9 miles)
- Distance: 4 laps, 12.2 km (7.6 miles)

Pole position
Drivers	(Sweden) Mikaela Åhlin-Kottulinsky; (Sweden) Johan Kristoffersson	Rosberg X Racing

Podium
First	(France) Sébastien Loeb; (Spain) Cristina Gutiérrez	X44
Second	(Spain) Carlos Sainz; (Spain) Laia Sanz	Acciona | Sainz XE
Third	(Qatar) Nasser Al-Attiyah; (Sweden) Klara Andersson	Abt Cupra XE

The 2022 Copper X-Prix (formally the 2022 Antofagasta Minerals Copper X-Prix) was an Extreme E off-road race that was held on 24 and 25 September 2022 in the small mining city of Calama, in the Atacama Desert in the Chilean region of Antofagasta. It was the fourth round of the electric off-road racing car series' second season, and also marked not only the first running of the event, but also the first time the series visited South America, after planned trips to Brazil and Argentina were cancelled in 2021. The final was won by Sébastien Loeb and Cristina Gutiérrez for X44 Vida Carbon Racing after a penalty for on-track winners Neom McLaren Extreme E. Acciona | Sainz XE Team and Abt Cupra XE rounded out the podium.

== Classification ==
=== Qualifying ===
Qualifying 2 draw
Heat 1	(Germany) Rosberg X Racing	(United States) Chip Ganassi Racing	(Spain) Xite Energy Racing	(United Kingdom) Veloce Racing	(United States) Andretti United XE
Heat 2	(United Kingdom) X44	(United Kingdom) McLaren XE	(Germany) Abt Cupra XE	(Spain) Acciona | Sainz XE	(United Kingdom) JBXE

Pos.	No.	Team	Drivers	Q1			Q2			Combined
Pos.	No.	Team	Drivers	Laps	Time	CP	Laps	Time	CP	Combined
1	6	(Germany) Rosberg X Racing	(Sweden) Mikaela Åhlin-Kottulinsky (Sweden) Johan Kristoffersson	4	8:49.216	10	4	10:18.574	8	18
2	44	(United Kingdom) X44 Vida Carbon Racing	(Spain) Cristina Gutiérrez (France) Sébastien Loeb	4	8:54.815	9	4	9:12.265	8	17
3	99	(United States) GMC Hummer EV Chip Ganassi Racing	(United States) Sara Price (United States) Kyle LeDuc	4	8:58.966	8	4	13:35.886	6	14
4	55	(Spain) Acciona | Sainz XE Team	(Spain) Laia Sanz (Spain) Carlos Sainz	4	9:21.650	3	4	9:03.763	10	13
5	23	(United States) Genesys Andretti United Extreme E	(United Kingdom) Catie Munnings (Sweden) Timmy Hansen	4	9:56.232	2	4	9:55.443	10	12
6	125	(Germany) Abt Cupra XE	(Sweden) Klara Andersson (Qatar) Nasser Al-Attiyah	4	9:09.760	5	4	9:13.796	6	11
7	58	(United Kingdom) Neom McLaren Extreme E	(New Zealand) Emma Gilmour (United States) Tanner Foust	4	9:00.016	7	4	9:26.935	2	9
8	42	(Spain) Xite Energy Racing	(Italy) Tamara Molinaro (Germany) Timo Scheider	4	9:04.669	6	2	7:52.633	0	6
9	22	(United Kingdom) JBXE	(Sweden) Kevin Hansen (Norway) Hedda Hosås	4	10:06.886	1	4	9:18.338	4	5
10	5	(United Kingdom) Veloce Racing	(Spain) Christine GZ (South Africa) Lance Woolridge	4	9:15.304	4	0	No time	0	4

Key
Colour	Advance to
Black	Semi-Final 1
Silver	Semi-Final 2
Bronze	Crazy Race
Gold	Final

Notes:

- Tie-breakers were determined by Super Sector times.

=== Semi-final 1 ===
Pos.	No.	Team	Drivers	Laps	Time	Points
1	6	(Germany) Rosberg X Racing	(Sweden) Mikaela Åhlin-Kottulinsky (Sweden) Johan Kristoffersson	4	9:04.370	8^{1}
2	55	(Spain) Acciona | Sainz XE Team	(Spain) Laia Sanz (Spain) Carlos Sainz	4	+6.439	
3	23	(United States) Genesys Andretti United Extreme E	(United Kingdom) Catie Munnings (Sweden) Timmy Hansen	4	+16.791	6

=== Semi-final 2 ===
Pos.	No.	Team	Drivers	Laps	Time	Points
1	44	(United Kingdom) X44 Vida Carbon Racing	(Spain) Cristina Gutiérrez (France) Sébastien Loeb	4	9:02.840	
2	125	(Germany) Abt Cupra XE	(Sweden) Klara Andersson (Qatar) Nasser Al-Attiyah	4	+3.519	
3	99	(United States) GMC Hummer EV Chip Ganassi Racing	(United States) Sara Price (United States) Kyle LeDuc	4	+6.314	^{1}

=== Crazy Race ===
Pos.	No.	Team	Drivers	Laps	Time	Points
1	58	(United Kingdom) Neom McLaren Extreme E	(New Zealand) Emma Gilmour (United States) Tanner Foust	4	9:12.588	
2	22	(United Kingdom) JBXE	(Sweden) Kevin Hansen (Norway) Hedda Hosås	4	+15.042	4
3	42	(Spain) Xite Energy Racing	(Italy) Tamara Molinaro (Germany) Timo Scheider	4	+19.474	2
4	5	(United Kingdom) Veloce Racing	(Spain) Christine GZ (South Africa) Lance Woolridge	4	+2:17.762	1

=== Final ===
Pos.	No.	Team	Drivers	Laps	Time	Points
1	44	(United Kingdom) X44 Vida Carbon Racing	(France) Sébastien Loeb (Spain) Cristina Gutiérrez	4	8:59.728	25
2	55	(Spain) Acciona | Sainz XE Team	(Spain) Carlos Sainz (Spain) Laia Sanz	4	+6.093	18
3	125	(Germany) Abt Cupra XE	(Qatar) Nasser Al-Attiyah (Sweden) Klara Andersson	4	+8.612	15
4	99	(United States) GMC Hummer EV Chip Ganassi Racing	(United States) Kyle LeDuc (United States) Sara Price	4	+10.159^{3}	12
5	58	(United Kingdom) Neom McLaren Extreme E	(United States) Tanner Foust (New Zealand) Emma Gilmour	4	+18.935^{3}	10+5^{2}

Notes:

- ^1 – Rosberg X Racing qualified for the final by virtue of winning semi-final 1, but technical issues meant they could not start the race. According to the sporting regulations, GMC Hummer EV Chip Ganassi Racing, who were first reserves, took their place on the grid. As such, Rosberg X Racing were recognised as sixth-place finishers, while Chip Ganassi Racing would score points based on their position in the final.
- ^2 – Team awarded 5 additional points for being fastest in the Super Sector.
- ^3 – Neom McLaren Extreme E finished first on the road, but received a pair of 10-second time penalties for dropping two waypoint flags that relegated them to last place. GMC Hummer EV Chip Ganassi Racing originally finished third and were briefly up to second due to McLaren's penalty, but later received a 5-second time penalty themselves for missing a waypoint.

Previous race: 2022 Island X-Prix	Extreme E Championship; 2022 season	Next race: 2022 Energy X-Prix
Previous race: N/A	Copper X-Prix	Next race: 2023 Copper X-Prix
