= Kyle LeDuc =

American racing driver (1981–2023)

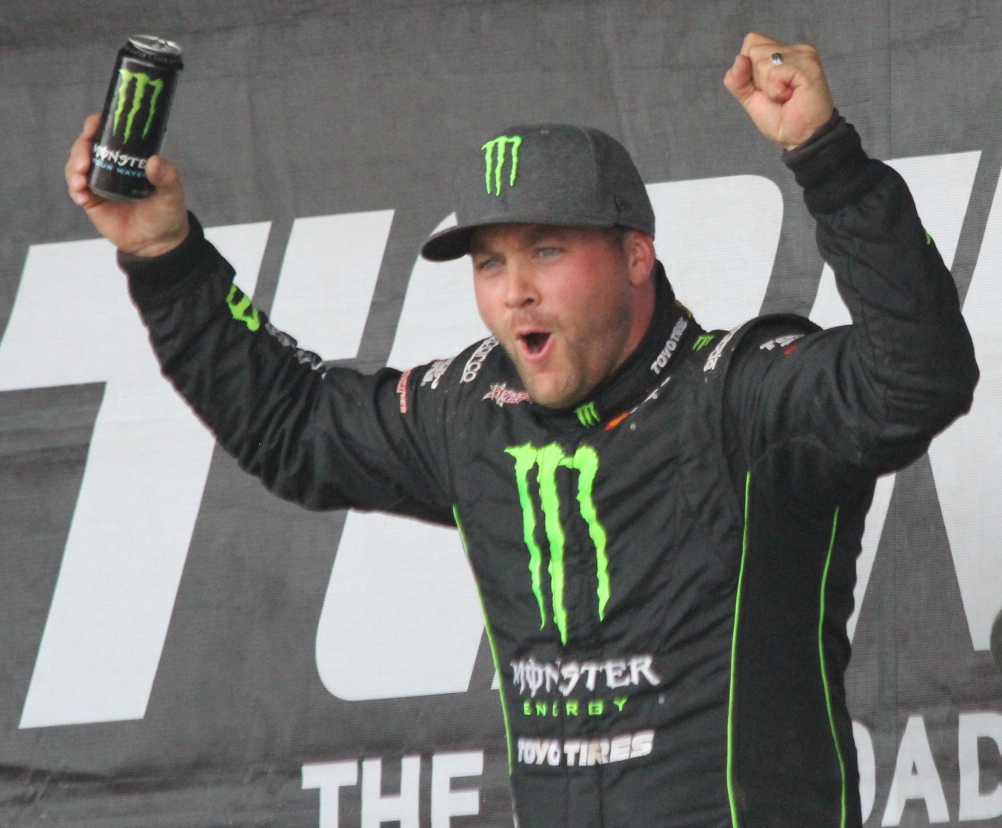
- LeDuc celebrating in 2014
- Born: July 29, 1981 East Longmeadow, Massachusetts, U.S.
- Died: November 11, 2023 (aged 42) Fairhope, Alabama, U.S.
- Relatives: Curt LeDuc (father); Todd LeDuc (brother)

Championship Off-Road Pro 4
- Years active: 2020–2022
- Starts: 21
- Championships: 1 (2020)
- Wins: 9
- Podiums: 12
- Best finish: 1st in 2020
- Finished last season: 2nd (2021)

Lucas Oil Off Road Racing Series Pro 4
- Years active: 2009–2019
- Starts: 140
- Championships: 6
- Wins: 60
- Podiums: 89
- Best finish: 1st in 2012, 2014–2017, 2019

Previous series
- 2021–2022 2013, 2015–2016: Extreme E Stadium Super Trucks

Championship titles
- 2020 2012, 2014–2017, 2019: COR Pro 4 LOORRS Pro 4
- Statistics up to date as of February 9, 2022.

Kyle LeDuc (July 29, 1981 – November 11, 2023) was an American professional racing driver. He mainly competed in short course off-road truck racing, where he had seven Pro 4 class championships, six of which came in the Lucas Oil Off Road Racing Series (LOORRS), and over 100 career wins.

LeDuc had also raced in Championship Off-Road Racing, Stadium Super Trucks, and TORC: The Off-Road Championship.

== Racing career ==
After growing up in mountain bike racing, during which he won various downhill championships, LeDuc switched to desert racing. In 1999 and 2000, he ran the SCORE International Laughlin Desert Challenge and scored the Baja 2000 Class 8 win during the latter. In 2002, he began short course off-road competition; at the age of 20, he was the youngest driver in active off-road competition at the time, which gave him the nickname "The Kid". The next year, he won the Pro Lite World Championship at Crandon International Off-Road Raceway, followed by the Championship Off-Road Racing Pro Lite title in 2004. In addition to competing in Pro Lite, he worked as a spotter and assistant for his father Curt's Pro 4 truck. While Curt was competing in the Dakar Rally, the younger LeDuc assembled his own Pro 4 chassis using components from his father's truck and was encouraged by Pro Lite sponsor Rockstar Energy to move into the higher class.

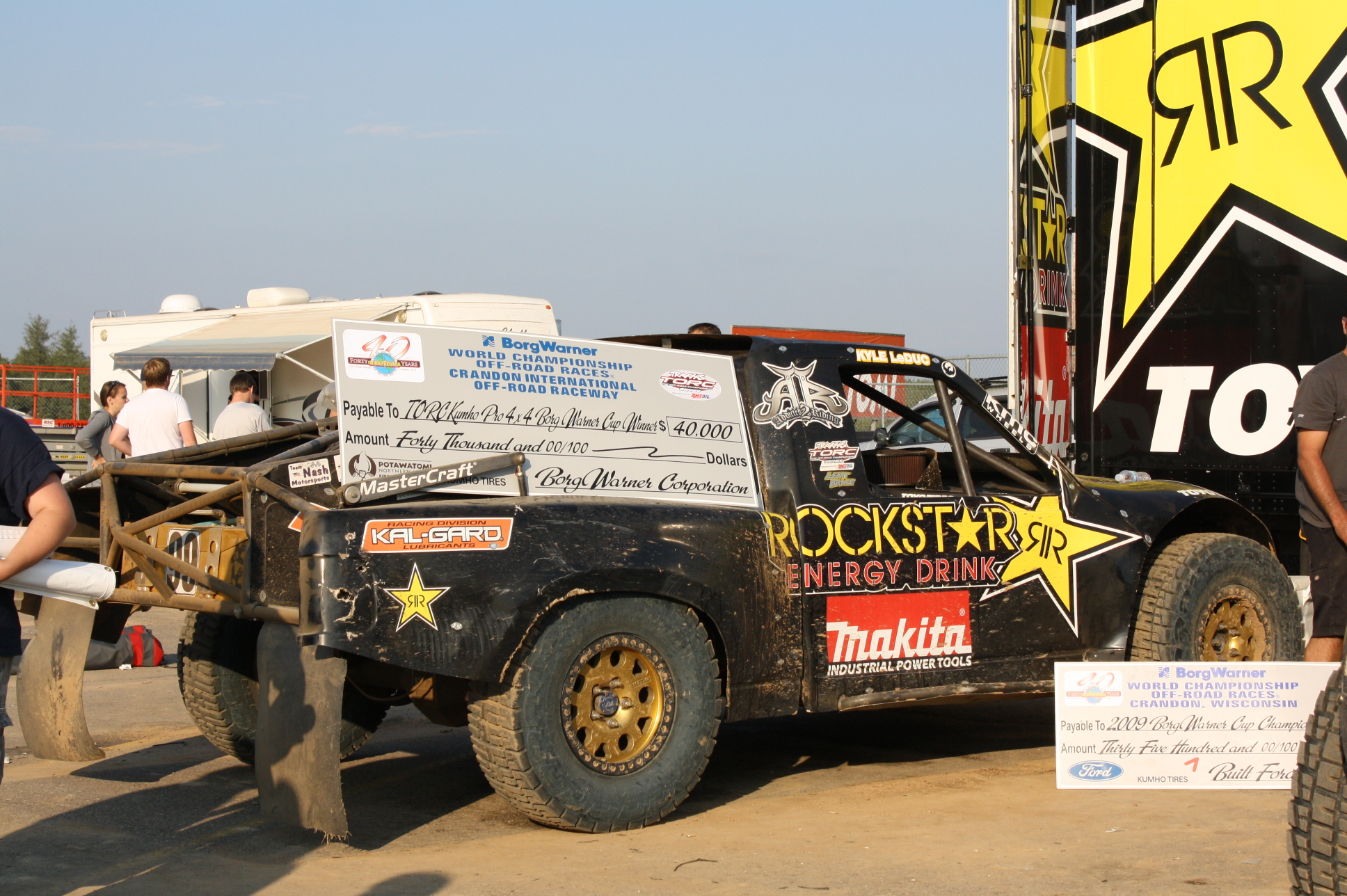
LeDuc's 2009 BorgWarner Cup-winning trophy truck

LeDuc made his Pro 4 debut in 2008, winning three times in his first season. In 2009, he began racing in the Lucas Oil Off Road Racing Series and Traxxas TORC Series, finishing second in the latter's championship. He also won the 2009 BorgWarner Cup at Crandon and 2010 Lucas Oil Challenge Cup; the latter is a race between Pro 2 and Pro 4 trucks. After finishing runner-up in the 2010 and 2011 LOORRS standings, LeDuc won the 2012 championship by 14 points over brother Todd LeDuc with seven victories, six of which were consecutive to start the season. He also won his second Challenge Cup.

In 2012, LeDuc conducted testing for the Stadium Super Trucks ahead of their inaugural season in 2013. He debuted in the series at the 2013 finale in Las Vegas; he won his heat race but finished last in the final after being involved in an accident. Two years later, LeDuc returned to SST for the Grand Prix of Long Beach and X Games Austin 2015. He finished tenth in Long Beach after starting fourth. At the X Games, he set the second-fastest time in qualifying, followed by finishing runner-up in his heat and ninth in the main. In 2016, he ran the SST weekend at the Sand Sports Super Show; after finishing seventh in the Friday night race, he was involved in a crash in the Saturday heat race that resulted in Tyler McQuarrie flipping onto his roof, which was followed by placing on the podium in the feature in third.

From 2014 to 2017, LeDuc won four consecutive LOORRS Pro 4 championships. The 2014 season saw him win 11 of 14 and receive LOORRS Driver of the Year honors; he also won the TORC World Championship Ring and AMSOIL Cup. In 2015, he set the LOORRS record for most Pro 4 wins in a row at ten and he ended the year with 12. LeDuc battled with Carl Renezeder for the 2016 championship and the two finished the year tied in points, with LeDuc claiming the tiebreaker as his eight wins outweighed Rezender's two. The fifth title came as part of a five-win campaign. The stretch also saw him win the Challenge Cup in 2014, 2016, and 2017.

After winning the 2016 LOORRS Pro 4 title, LeDuc entered the Baja 1000 for Riviera Racing alongside Mark Post, who was officially listed as the team's driver in the race results. LeDuc won the pole position after setting the fastest qualifying time and Post finished fifth.

A sixth LOORRS Pro 4 title and fifth Challenge Cup came in 2019. Low entry numbers forced LOORRS to cancel the 2020 Pro 4 season, which prompted LeDuc to join the newly formed Championship Off-Road series in the same class. He won five of ten races, including the final weekend at Crandon, and the COR championship for his seventh title in Pro 4. When he swept the COR weekend at ERX Motor Park in July, he scored his 100th career win.

Shortly after his 100th race victory, Chip Ganassi Racing signed LeDuc for the first Extreme E season in 2021, sharing an electric SUV with fellow off-road racer and X Games athlete Sara Price.

== Personal life ==
LeDuc grew up in Cherry Valley, California. Father Curt competed in short course and desert racing while older brother Todd has also raced in LOORRS and Monster Jam. He also had a sister Valerie.

LeDuc lived in Fairhope, Alabama, and had two children with his wife Amber (née Mader). Kyle proposed to Amber prior to a 2008 CORR Pro 4 race at Las Vegas International Off-Road Raceway, where he eventually finished second.

=== Illness and death ===
In November 2022, LeDuc was diagnosed with stage IV head and neck cancer, and was sidelined from competing in the 2023 Championship Off-Road season. He died on November 11, 2023, after suffering cardiac arrest. He was 42.

== Motorsports career results ==
=== Career summary ===
Season	Series	Races	Wins	Podiums	Points	Position	Ref
2009	LOORRS Unlimited 4	4	3	4	202	9th	
2010	LOORRS Pro 4	15	1	8	630	**2nd**	
2011	LOORRS Pro 4	15	5	8	656	**2nd**	
2012	LOORRS Pro 4	15	7	11	709	**1st**	
2013	LOORRS Pro 4	15	3	8	647	**2nd**	
2013	LOORRS Pro 2	13	0	0	482	8th	
2013	Stadium Super Trucks	1	0	0	23	22nd	
2014	LOORRS Pro 4	15	11	11	722	**1st**	
2015	LOORRS Pro 4	17	12	14	790	**1st**	
2015	Stadium Super Trucks	2	0	0	33	23rd	
2016	LOORRS Pro 4	15	8	10	692	**1st**	
2016	Stadium Super Trucks	2	0	1	35	24th	
2017	LOORRS Pro 4	13	5	8	584	**1st**	
2018	LOORRS Pro 4	11	3	4	524	**3rd**	
2019	LOORRS Pro 4	9	6	7	471	**1st**	
2020	COR Pro4	10	5	7	223	**1st**	
2021	COR Pro4	11	4	5	479	**2nd**	
2021	Extreme E	5	0	0	59	8th	
2022	Extreme E	4	1	0	55	5th	

=== Stadium Super Trucks ===
(key) (Bold – Pole position. Italics – Fastest qualifier. * – Most laps led.)

Stadium Super Trucks results
Year	1	2	3	4	5	6	7	8	9	10	11	12	13	14	15	16	17	18	19	20	21	22	SSTC	Pts	Ref
2013	PHO	LBH	LAN	SDG	SDG	STL	TOR	TOR	CRA	CRA	OCF	OCF	OCF	CPL; 10									22nd	23	
2015	ADE	ADE	ADE	STP	STP	LBH; 10	DET	DET	DET	AUS; 10	TOR	TOR	OCF	OCF	OCF	SRF	SRF	SRF	SRF	SYD	LVV	LVV	23rd	33	
2016	ADE	ADE	ADE	STP	STP	LBH	LBH	DET	DET	DET	TOW	TOW	TOW	TOR	TOR	CLT	CLT	OCF; 7	OCF; 3	SRF	SRF	SRF	24th	35	

=== Extreme E ===
(key)

Year	Team	Car	1	2	3	4	5	6	7	8	9	10	Pos.	Points
2021	Segi TV Chip Ganassi Racing	Spark ODYSSEY 21	DES; Q 7	DES; R 8	OCE; Q 7	OCE; R 7	ARC; Q 7	ARC; R 9	ISL; Q 5	ISL; R 4	JUR; Q 8	JUR; R 8	8th	59 (Note: LeDuc received a 1 championship point penalty for causing a collision in the shoot-out race of the Desert X-Prix.)
2022	GMC Hummer EV Chip Ganassi Racing	Spark ODYSSEY 21	DES; 4	ISL1; 1	ISL2; 7	COP; 4	ENE						5th	55
