= Emma Gilmour =

New Zealand rally driver (born 1979)

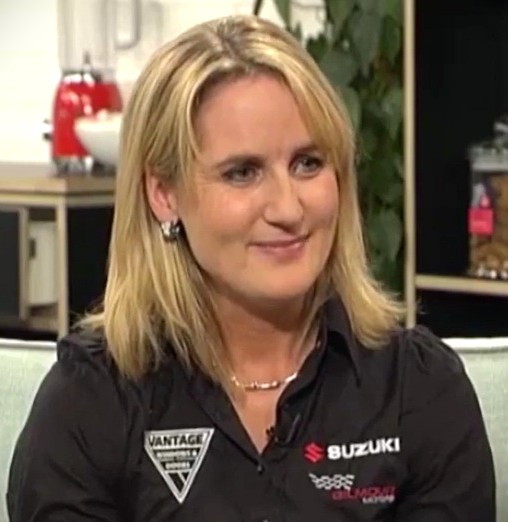
- Gilmour in 2016
- Nationality: (New Zealand) New Zealander
- Born: 30 September 1979 (age 47) Dunedin, New Zealand

Extreme E career
- Debut season: 2021
- Former teams: Veloce Racing, McLaren XE
- Starts: 13
- Wins: 0
- Podiums: 2
- Poles: 0
- Best finish: 7th in 2022
- Finished last season: 13th (2023)

Emma Bridget Gilmour (born 30 September 1979) is a rally driver from New Zealand.

== Early and personal life ==
Gilmour was born in Dunedin in 1979. Her father and maternal grandfather were both mechanics. Before taking up motor racing in her early 20s, she was an equestrian representing Otago–Southland in eventing and participating in the New Zealand development squads. Gilmour completed a design studies degree at the University of Otago.

Gilmour runs a Suzuki car dealership in Dunedin outside of racing.

== Racing career ==
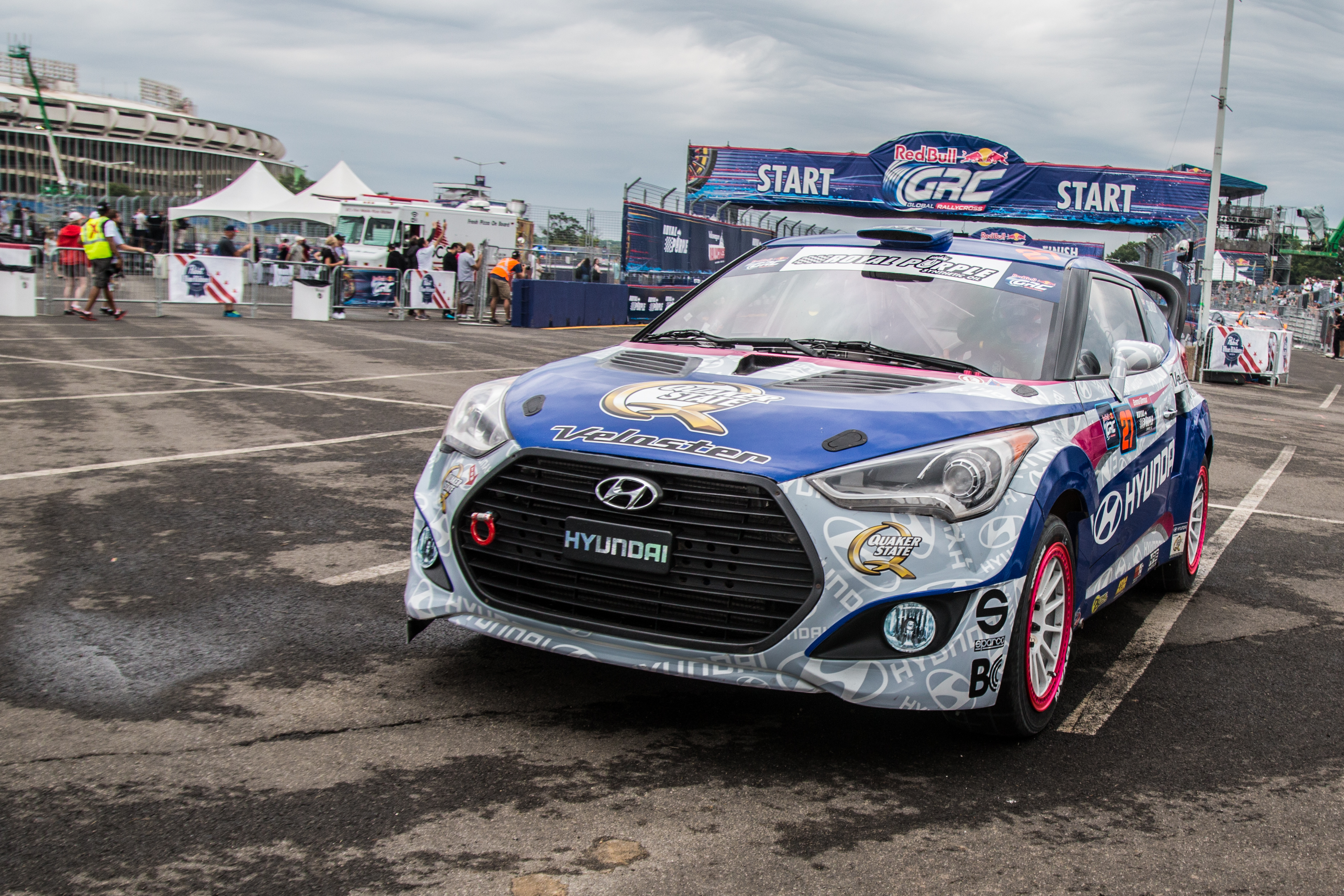
Gilmour in her Hyundai Veloster Turbo Supercar in 2014

=== New Zealand Rally Championship ===
Gilmour is a three-time New Zealand Rally Championship runner-up.

=== Global Rallycross Championship ===
Gilmour became the first woman to enter the Global Rallycross Championship, competing under Rhys Millen Racing in a Hyundai Veloster Turbo for the 2014 season.

=== Extreme E ===
==== Veloce Racing (2021) ====
Gilmour was signed by Veloce Racing as reserve driver for the inaugural season of the new electric off-road racing series in 2021, Extreme E in 2021. She replaced regular driver Jamie Chadwick in two events.

==== McLaren (2022–2023) ====
Gilmour moved to McLaren XE for the 2022 season, becoming the first female factory driver to race for McLaren. Partnering Tanner Foust, she achieved one podium finish at the season-ending Energy X-Prix and became the first female podium winner for McLaren. Gilmour and Foust were retained for the 2023 season. McLaren won its second podium by finishing second in Round 4 at the Hydro X-Prix. In Round 7 at the Island X-Prix II, Gilmour suffered a fractured rib and a concussion following a crash during the first free practice session and was ruled out for the rest of the weekend. She was replaced by championship reserve driver Tamara Molinaro for Rounds 7 and 8. For the final two rounds of the season, McLaren announced that Gilmour was still recovering from her injuries and was replaced by JBXE's Hedda Hosås. At the end of the season, McLaren announced that Gilmour and Foust would leave the team after two seasons.

== Racing record ==
=== Complete Global Rallycross Championship results ===
Year	Entrant	Car	1	2	3	4	5	6	7	8	9	10	GRC	Points
2014	Rhys Millen Racing	Hyundai Veloster	BAR 12	AUS 12	DC 12	NY 11	CHA 12	DAY 11	LA1 13	LA2 11	SEA 13	LV 7	13th	62

=== Complete Extreme E results ===
(key)

Year	Team	Car	1	2	3	4	5	6	7	8	9	10	Pos.	Points
2021	Veloce Racing	Spark ODYSSEY 21	DES; Q	DES; R	OCE; Q	OCE; R	ARC; Q 5	ARC; R 6	ISL; Q 8	ISL; R 8	JUR; Q	JUR; R	11th	29
2022	NEOM McLaren Extreme E Team	Spark ODYSSEY 21	DES; 5	ISL1; 10	ISL2; 6	COP; 5	ENE; 2						7th	46
2023	NEOM McLaren Extreme E Team	Spark ODYSSEY 21	DES; 1; 6	DES; 2; 7	HYD; 1; 8	HYD; 2; 2	ISL1; 1; 7	ISL1; 2; 9	ISL2; 1 WD	ISL2; 2	COP; 1	COP; 2	13th	44
