= 2022 Extreme E Championship =

Electric car racing season

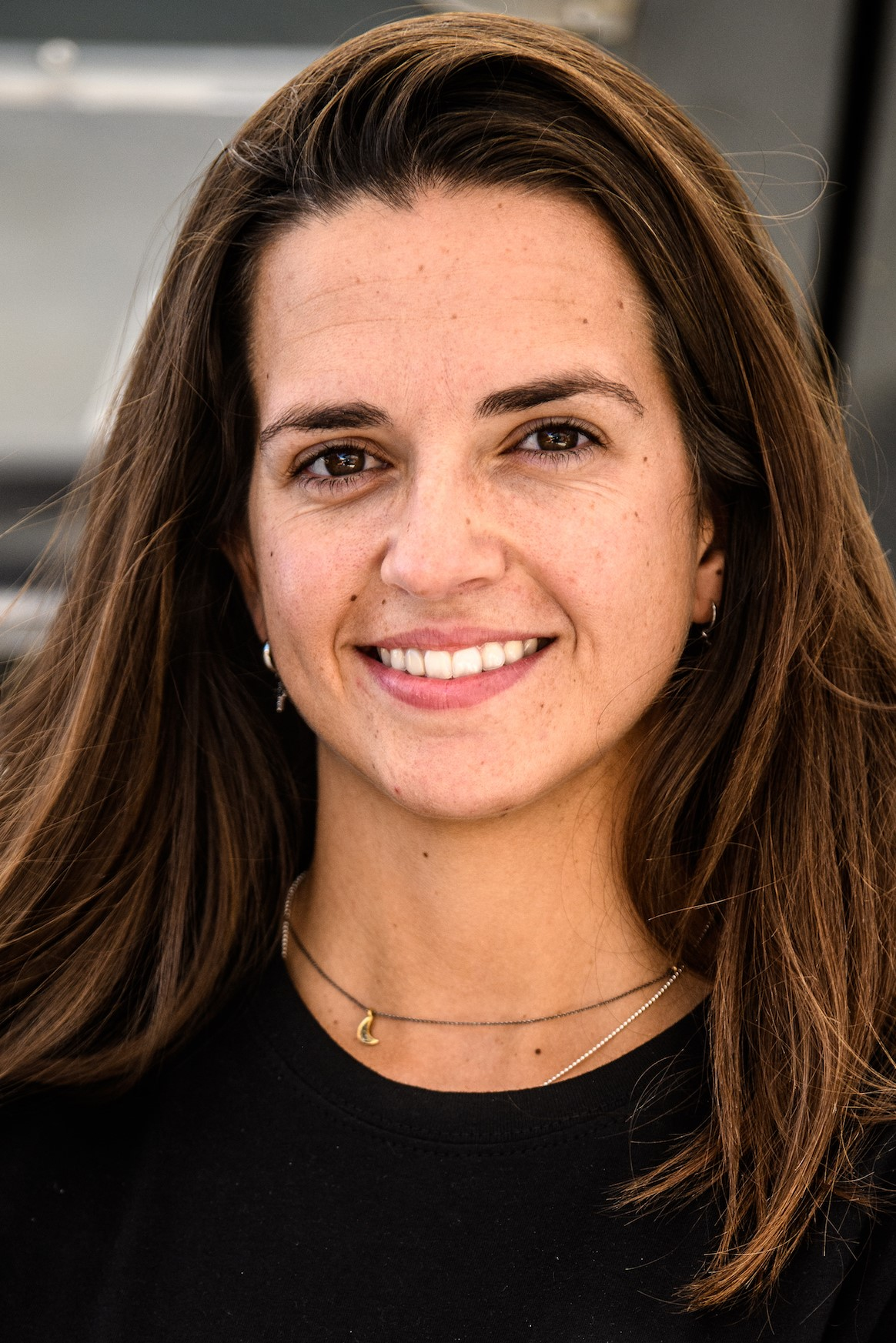
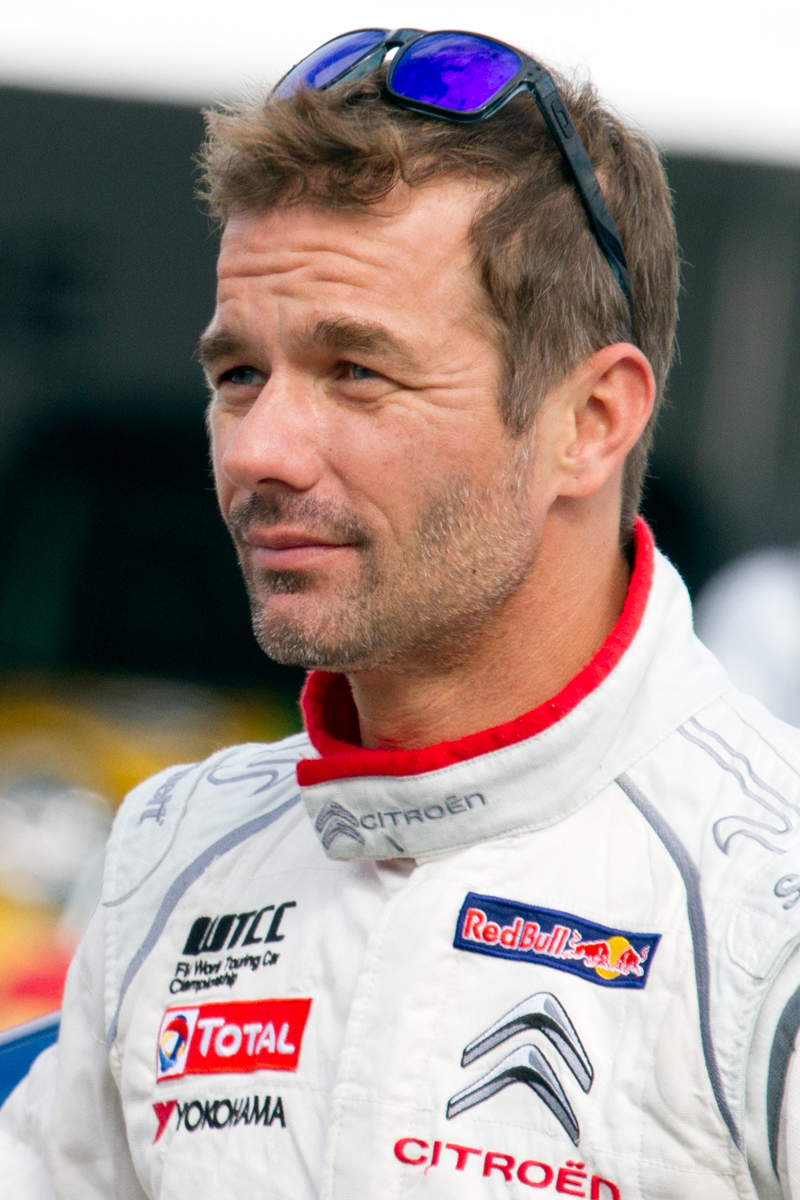
Cristina Gutiérrez (left) and Sebastien Loeb (right) won the championship for Team X44.

The 2022 Extreme E Championship was the second season of the Extreme E electric off-road racing series.

== Calendar ==
On 24 September 2021, a provisional five-round calendar was revealed, which included a return to Saudi Arabia for the season opener in February, an African event, a second Arctic X-Prix in Greenland or Iceland, and two trips to South America. A further update was announced on 22 December 2021. Saudi Arabia and Sardinia returned from the previous year, with new events were to be held in Chile, Uruguay and either Scotland or Senegal. The latter was later cancelled on 8 April due to logistical issues, with Sardinia postponed until July and hosting two events.

Locations of the 2022 races

Round	Dates	Event	Location
1	19–20 February 2022	Desert X-Prix	Neom, Saudi Arabia
2	6–7 July 2022	Island X-Prix I	Sardinia, Italy
3	9–10 July 2022	Island X-Prix II	Sardinia, Italy
4	24–25 September 2022	Copper X-Prix	Antofagasta, Chile
5	26–27 November 2022	Energy X-Prix	Punta del Este, Uruguay

The following events were cancelled:

Original Date	Event	Location
7–8 May 2022	Ocean X-Prix	Scotland or Senegal
9–10 July 2022	Arctic X-Prix	Greenland or Iceland

=== Race format ===
Rule changes regarding the race format were introduced for the start of the season. Qualifying now consists of one round of qualifying time trial and another of qualifying races, with the latter comprising two five-car heats. The intermediate classification points system was kept but updated to accommodate the introduction of heats (10 points for the time trial winner down to 1 for the last-placed team; 10, 8, 6, 4 and 2 for the heats), but championship points are no longer awarded based on combined qualifying results, in an attempt to put the primary focus on the races. The progression to the semi-finals was also slightly tweaked: fourth and fifth now advance to semi-final 1, while sixth moves on to semi-final 2; as a new team entered the championship, four cars now composed the "crazy race". Lastly, a new scoring system akin to the one used in Formula 1, albeit with the five extra points for the "super sector", was implemented.

== Teams and drivers ==
All teams that competed in the 2021 championship remained in 2022, with McLaren joining to form a ten-car grid. All teams used one of the identical Odyssey 21 electric SUVs manufactured by Spark Racing Technology, with Abt Cupra XE and Chip Ganassi Racing running modified bodyworks. Each team consists of a male and a female driver, who share a car and have equal driving duties.

Team	No.	Drivers	Rounds
(United Kingdom) Veloce Racing	5	(Spain) Christine GZ	1–4
(United Kingdom) Veloce Racing	5	(Norway) Hedda Hosås	1
(United Kingdom) Veloce Racing	5	(Australia) Molly Taylor	5
(United Kingdom) Veloce Racing	5	(South Africa) Lance Woolridge	1–4
(United Kingdom) Veloce Racing	5	(Sweden) Kevin Hansen	5
(Germany) Rosberg X Racing	6	(Sweden) Johan Kristoffersson	All
(Germany) Rosberg X Racing	6	(Sweden) Mikaela Åhlin-Kottulinsky	All
(United Kingdom) JBXE	22	(Sweden) Kevin Hansen	1–4
(United Kingdom) JBXE	22	(Jamaica) Fraser McConnell	5
(United Kingdom) JBXE	22	(Australia) Molly Taylor	1
(United Kingdom) JBXE	22	(Norway) Hedda Hosås	2–5
(United States) Genesys Andretti United Extreme E	23	(United Kingdom) Catie Munnings	All
(United States) Genesys Andretti United Extreme E	23	(Sweden) Timmy Hansen	All
(Spain) Xite Energy Racing	42	(United Kingdom) Oliver Bennett	1
(Spain) Xite Energy Racing	42	(Germany) Timo Scheider	2–4
(Spain) Xite Energy Racing	42	(Argentina) Ezequiel Pérez Companc	5
(Spain) Xite Energy Racing	42	(Italy) Tamara Molinaro	All
(United Kingdom) Team X44 (United Kingdom) X44 Vida Carbon Racing (Note: Team X44 rebranded as X44 Vida Carbon Racing ahead of round 4 for sponsorship reasons.)	44	(Spain) Cristina Gutiérrez	All
(United Kingdom) Team X44 (United Kingdom) X44 Vida Carbon Racing	44	(France) Sébastien Loeb	All
(Spain) Acciona | Sainz XE Team	55	(Spain) Carlos Sainz	All
(Spain) Acciona | Sainz XE Team	55	(Spain) Laia Sanz	All
(United Kingdom) McLaren XE (United Kingdom) Neom McLaren Extreme E Team (Note: McLaren XE rebranded as Neom McLaren Extreme E Team ahead of round 2 for sponsorship reasons.)	58	(New Zealand) Emma Gilmour	All
(United Kingdom) McLaren XE (United Kingdom) Neom McLaren Extreme E Team	58	(United States) Tanner Foust	All
(United States) Chip Ganassi Racing (United States) GMC Hummer EV Chip Ganassi Racing (Note: Chip Ganassi Racing rebranded as GMC Hummer EV Chip Ganassi Racing ahead of round 2 for sponsorship reasons.)	99	(United States) Kyle LeDuc	1–4
(United States) Chip Ganassi Racing (United States) GMC Hummer EV Chip Ganassi Racing	99	(United States) RJ Anderson	5
(United States) Chip Ganassi Racing (United States) GMC Hummer EV Chip Ganassi Racing	99	(United States) Sara Price	All
(Germany) Abt Cupra XE	125	(Germany) Jutta Kleinschmidt	1–4
(Germany) Abt Cupra XE	125	(Sweden) Klara Andersson	4–5
(Germany) Abt Cupra XE	125	(Qatar) Nasser Al-Attiyah	All

- Klara Andersson was scheduled to compete for Xite Energy Racing, but did not appear at any rounds.

Championship reserve drivers
Drivers	Rounds
(Norway) Hedda Hosås	1
(Sweden) Klara Andersson	2–4
(Spain) Christine GZ	5
(France) Romain Dumas	1
(Jamaica) Fraser McConnell	2–4
(Germany) Timo Scheider	5

== Results and standings ==
=== X-Prix ===
Round	Event	Qualifying 1	Qualifying 2		Qualifying Overall	Semi-Final 1	Semi-Final 2	Crazy Race	Super Sector (Note: Commercially known as the "Continental Traction Challenge".)	Final	Report
Round	Event	Qualifying 1	Heat 1	Heat 2	Qualifying Overall	Semi-Final 1	Semi-Final 2	Crazy Race	Super Sector	Final	Report
1	(Saudi Arabia) Desert X-Prix	(Germany) RXR	(United Kingdom) X44	(United States) Andretti United	(United Kingdom) X44	(United Kingdom) X44	(United States) Chip Ganassi	(United Kingdom) McLaren	(Germany) RXR	(Germany) RXR	Report
2	(Italy) Island X-Prix I	(Germany) RXR	(Germany) RXR	(Spain) Acciona | Sainz	(Germany) RXR	(Germany) RXR	(United Kingdom) JBXE	(United States) Chip Ganassi	(Germany) RXR	(United States) Chip Ganassi	Report
3	(Italy) Island X-Prix II	(Germany) RXR	(Germany) RXR	(Spain) Acciona | Sainz	(Germany) RXR	(Germany) RXR	(United Kingdom) X44	(United States) Andretti United	(Germany) RXR	(Germany) RXR	Report
4	(Chile) Copper X-Prix	(Germany) RXR	(United States) Andretti United	(Spain) Acciona | Sainz	(Germany) RXR	(Germany) RXR	(United Kingdom) X44	(United Kingdom) McLaren	(United Kingdom) McLaren	(United Kingdom) X44	Report
5	(Uruguay) Energy X-Prix	(Spain) Acciona | Sainz	(United States) Andretti United	(United Kingdom) Veloce	(United Kingdom) Veloce	(United Kingdom) Veloce	(United States) Andretti United	(United Kingdom) X44	(United Kingdom) X44	(Germany) Abt Cupra	Report

Scoring system

Points are awarded to the top ten finishers. An additional 5 points are given to the fastest team in the Super Sector over the whole weekend.

Position	1st	2nd	3rd	4th	5th	6th	7th	8th	9th	10th	SS
Points	25	18	15	12	10	8	6	4	2	1	5 (Note: Only for the teams' championship.)

Only the best four X-Prix results count towards the drivers' championship.

=== Drivers' Championship standings ===
Pos.	Driver	DES (Saudi Arabia)	ISL1 (Italy)	ISL2 (Italy)	COP (Chile)	ENE (Uruguay)	Points
1	(Spain) Cristina Gutiérrez (France) Sébastien Loeb	3	6	2	1	3	73
2	(Sweden) Johan Kristoffersson (Sweden) Mikaela Åhlin-Kottulinsky	1	5	1	6	10	68
3	(Spain) Carlos Sainz (Spain) Laia Sanz	2	4	4	2	7	60
4	(United States) Sara Price	4	1	7	4	6	57
5	(United States) Kyle LeDuc	4	1	7	4		55
6	(Qatar) Nasser Al-Attiyah	8	9	DSQ	3	1	46
7	(New Zealand) Emma Gilmour (United States) Tanner Foust	5	10	6	5	2	46
8	(Sweden) Klara Andersson				3	1	40
9	(United Kingdom) Catie Munnings (Sweden) Timmy Hansen	7	7	3	7	4	39
10	(Sweden) Kevin Hansen	9	3	8	8	5	33
11	(Italy) Tamara Molinaro	6	2	10	9	8	32
12	(Norway) Hedda Hosås	10	3	8	8	9	25
13	(Germany) Timo Scheider		2	10	9		21
14	(Australia) Molly Taylor	9				5	12
15	(United Kingdom) Oliver Bennett	6					8
16	(United States) RJ Anderson					6	8
17	(South Africa) Lance Woolridge	10	8	9	10		8
18	(Spain) Christine GZ	WD	8	9	10		7
19	(Germany) Jutta Kleinschmidt	8	9	DSQ	WD		6
20	(Argentina) Ezequiel Pérez Companc					8	4
21	(Jamaica) Fraser McConnell					9	2
Pos.	Driver	DES (Saudi Arabia)	ISL1 (Italy)	ISL2 (Italy)	COP (Chile)	ENE (Uruguay)	Points

Key
Colour	Result
Gold	Winner
Silver	2nd place
Bronze	3rd place
Green	Other points position
Black	Disqualified (DSQ)
White	Did not start (DNS)
White	Withdrew (WD)
White	Race cancelled (C)

* – Fastest in Super Sector

=== Teams' Championship standings ===
Pos.	Team	DES (Saudi Arabia)	ISL1 (Italy)	ISL2 (Italy)	COP (Chile)	ENE (Uruguay)	Points
1	(United Kingdom) Team X44 (United Kingdom) X44 Vida Carbon Racing	3	6	2	1	3*	86
2	(Germany) Rosberg X Racing	1*	5*	1*	6	10	84
3	(Spain) Acciona | Sainz XE Team	2	4	4	2	7	66
4	(United States) Chip Ganassi Racing (United States) GMC Hummer EV Chip Ganassi Racing	4	1	7	4	6	63
5	(United Kingdom) McLaren XE (United Kingdom) Neom McLaren Extreme E Team	5	10	6	5*	2	52
6	(Germany) Abt Cupra XE	8	9	DSQ	3	1	46
7	(United States) Genesys Andretti United Extreme E	7	7	3	7	4	45
8	(Spain) Xite Energy Racing	6	2	10	9	8	33
9	(United Kingdom) JBXE	9	3	8	8	9	27
10	(United Kingdom) Veloce Racing	10	8	9	10	5	18
Pos.	Team	DES (Saudi Arabia)	ISL1 (Italy)	ISL2 (Italy)	COP (Chile)	ENE (Uruguay)	Points
