= 2022 Desert X-Prix =

Round 1 of 5 of the 2022 Extreme E Championship
Next race →

Race details
- Date: 19–20 February 2022
- Location: Neom, Saudi Arabia
- Course: Sand, rock
- Course length: 6.9 km (4.3 miles)
- Distance: 2 laps, 13.8 km (8.6 miles)

Pole position
Drivers	(Spain) Cristina Gutiérrez; (France) Sébastien Loeb	Team X44

Podium
First	(Sweden) Mikaela Åhlin-Kottulinsky; (Sweden) Johan Kristoffersson	Rosberg X Racing
Second	(Spain) Carlos Sainz; (Spain) Laia Sanz	Acciona | Sainz XE
Third	(France) Sébastien Loeb; (Spain) Cristina Gutiérrez	Team X44

The 2022 Desert X-Prix was an Extreme E off-road race that was held on 19 and 20 February 2022 in the future planned city of Neom, Saudi Arabia. It was the first round of the electric off-road racing car series' second season, and also marked the second running of the event, albeit in a different location to 2021. The final was won by Mikaela Åhlin-Kottulinsky and Johan Kristoffersson for reigning champions Rosberg X Racing, ahead of the Acciona | Sainz XE Team and Team X44.

== Classification ==
=== Qualifying ===
Qualifying 2 draw
Heat 1	(United Kingdom) Team X44	(United States) Chip Ganassi Racing	(Spain) Acciona | Sainz XE	(Germany) Abt Cupra XE	(United Kingdom) Veloce Racing
Heat 2	(Germany) Rosberg X Racing	(United States) Andretti United XE	(Spain) Xite Energy Racing	(United Kingdom) McLaren XE	(United Kingdom) JBXE

Pos.	No.	Team	Drivers	Q1			Q2			Combined
Pos.	No.	Team	Drivers	Laps	Time	CP	Laps	Time	CP	Combined
1	44	(United Kingdom) Team X44	(Spain) Cristina Gutiérrez (France) Sébastien Loeb	2	9:10.515	9	2	9:00.620	10	19
2	23	(United States) Genesys Andretti United Extreme E	(United Kingdom) Catie Munnings (Sweden) Timmy Hansen	2	9:14.695	8	2	9:10.693	10	18
3	99	(United States) Chip Ganassi Racing	(United States) Kyle LeDuc (United States) Sara Price	2	9:15.842	7	2	9:20.200	8	15
4	6	(Germany) Rosberg X Racing	(Sweden) Johan Kristoffersson (Sweden) Mikaela Åhlin-Kottulinsky	2	9:03.604	10	2	9:26.772	4	14
5	42	(Spain) Xite Energy Racing	(Italy) Tamara Molinaro (United Kingdom) Oliver Bennett	2	9:17.403	6	2	9:24.396	8	14
6	55	(Spain) Acciona | Sainz XE Team	(Spain) Laia Sanz (Spain) Carlos Sainz	2	9:21.355	5	1	4:59.752	6	11
7	22	(United Kingdom) JBXE	(Sweden) Kevin Hansen (Australia) Molly Taylor	2	10:04.367	2	2	9:26.064	6	8
8	58	(United Kingdom) McLaren XE	(New Zealand) Emma Gilmour (United States) Tanner Foust	2	9:26.979	4	2	10:03.366	2	6
9	125	(Germany) Abt Cupra XE	(Germany) Jutta Kleinschmidt (Qatar) Nasser Al-Attiyah	2	9:50.385	3	2	12:14.592	2^{1}	5
10	5	(United Kingdom) Veloce Racing	(South Africa) Lance Woolridge (Spain) Christine GZ	1	9:14.817	0	0	No time	0	0

Key
Colour	Advance to
Black	Semi-Final 1
Silver	Semi-Final 2
Bronze	Crazy Race
Gold	Final

Notes:

- Tie-breakers were determined by Super Sector times.
- ^1 – Abt Cupra XE were demoted one position and deducted two intermediate points for causing a collision in heat 1 of qualifying 2.

=== Semi-final 1 ===
Pos.	No.	Team	Drivers	Laps	Time	Points
1	44	(United Kingdom) Team X44	(Spain) Cristina Gutiérrez (France) Sébastien Loeb	2	9:05.107	
2	6	(Germany) Rosberg X Racing	(Sweden) Johan Kristoffersson (Sweden) Mikaela Åhlin-Kottulinsky	2	+7.660	
3	42	(Spain) Xite Energy Racing	(Italy) Tamara Molinaro (United Kingdom) Oliver Bennett	2	+17.590^{1}	8

Notes:

- ^1 – Xite Energy Racing originally finished second, but later received a 10-second time penalty for taking down a waypoint flag.

=== Semi-final 2 ===
Pos.	No.	Team	Drivers	Laps	Time	Points
1	99	(United States) Chip Ganassi Racing	(United States) Kyle LeDuc (United States) Sara Price	2	9:12.337	
2	55	(Spain) Acciona | Sainz XE Team	(Spain) Laia Sanz (Spain) Carlos Sainz	2	+6.850	
3	23	(United States) Genesys Andretti United Extreme E	(United Kingdom) Catie Munnings (Sweden) Timmy Hansen	1	+1 lap	6

=== Crazy Race ===
Pos.	No.	Team	Drivers	Laps	Time	Points
1	58	(United Kingdom) McLaren XE	(New Zealand) Emma Gilmour (United States) Tanner Foust	2	9:14.250	
2	125	(Germany) Abt Cupra XE	(Germany) Jutta Kleinschmidt (Qatar) Nasser Al-Attiyah	2	+2.642	4
3	22	(United Kingdom) JBXE	(Sweden) Kevin Hansen (Australia) Molly Taylor	2	+11.623	2
4	5	(United Kingdom) Veloce Racing	(South Africa) Lance Woolridge (Norway) Hedda Hosås	2	+3:39.676	1

Notes:

- Veloce's Christine GZ was replaced by Hedda Hosås after suffering an injury in qualifying.

=== Final ===
Pos.	No.	Team	Drivers	Laps	Time	Points
1	6	(Germany) Rosberg X Racing	(Sweden) Mikaela Åhlin-Kottulinsky (Sweden) Johan Kristoffersson	2	27:08.453	25+5^{1}
2	55	(Spain) Acciona | Sainz XE Team	(Spain) Carlos Sainz (Spain) Laia Sanz	2	+2.483	18
3	44	(United Kingdom) Team X44	(France) Sébastien Loeb (Spain) Cristina Gutiérrez	2	+5.807	15
4	99	(United States) Chip Ganassi Racing	(United States) Sara Price (United States) Kyle LeDuc	2	+25.202	12
5	58	(United Kingdom) McLaren XE	(United States) Tanner Foust (New Zealand) Emma Gilmour	0	+2 laps	10

Notes:

- The race was red-flagged at the end of lap 1 after a crash for McLaren's Tanner Foust. All four other teams took the restart, with the gaps maintained.
- ^1 – Team awarded 5 additional points for being fastest in the Super Sector.

Previous race: 2021 Jurassic X-Prix	Extreme E Championship; 2022 season	Next race: 2022 Island X-Prix
Previous race: 2021 Desert X-Prix	Desert X-Prix	Next race: 2023 Desert X-Prix
