= Veloce Racing =

British racing team

(United Kingdom) Veloce Racing
- Founded: 2020
- Team principal(s): Rupert Svendsen-Cook; Mariella Bailey
- Current series: Extreme H
- Former series: W Series; Extreme E
- Current drivers: (Sweden) Kevin Hansen (Australia) Molly Taylor
- Noted drivers: Extreme E (United Kingdom) Jamie Chadwick (New Zealand) Emma Gilmour (Spain) Christine GZ (Norway) Hedda Hosås (France) Stéphane Sarrazin (South Africa) Lance Woolridge; W Series (United Kingdom) Jamie Chadwick (Brazil) Bruna Tomaselli
- Drivers' Championships: W Series: 2021: Jamie Chadwick
- Website: https://www.veloce.gg/racing

Veloce Racing is a British motorsport team founded by Jean-Éric Vergne, Adrian Newey and Rupert Svendsen-Cook. Veloce formerly competed in the all-female single-seater racing series W Series and the all-electric off-road racing championship Extreme E.

== Extreme E ==
=== 2021 ===
Veloce joined Extreme E for its inaugural season in 2021, announcing 2019 W Series champion Jamie Chadwick and former F1 and WRC driver Stéphane Sarrazin as their line-up. The team, racing with technical support from ART Grand Prix, won their first podium in the series at the 2021 Ocean X-Prix. Veloce finished the season 7th in the teams championship with a total of 77 points.

=== 2022 ===
On 6 January 2022 Veloce announced that Jamie Chadwick would be replaced for the 2022 season by Christine GZ. At the first round of the season in Saudi Arabia, Christine GZ fractured her foot while competing in Q1, requiring Hedda Hosås to replace her for the remainder of the round.

Prior to the 2022 Energy X-Prix, Veloce announced that Kevin Hansen and Molly Taylor would immediately "form the team's new driver pairing" for both the final race of 2022, along with the entire 2023 season. Veloce also appointed 2006 Dakar Rally winner and former alpine skier Luc Alphand as Extreme E team principal.

=== 2023 ===
Veloce won their first race at the 2023 Desert X-Prix after RXR received a 136-second penalty for speeding under a yellow flag. The team also recorded victories in both Round 04 (2023 Hydro X-Prix) and Round 10 (2023 Copper X-Prix) making it their most successful Extreme E season to date.

=== 2024 ===
Veloce retained Hansen and Taylor for the second consecutive season, and E.ON was announced as the team's title sponsor with the team being known as E.ON Veloce Racing and later E.ON Next Veloce Racing for the season. On 6 September 2024, a week before the scheduled Island X-Prix, Extreme E announced that the rounds in Sardinia and Phoenix were cancelled with Veloce Racing leading the championship.

== W Series ==
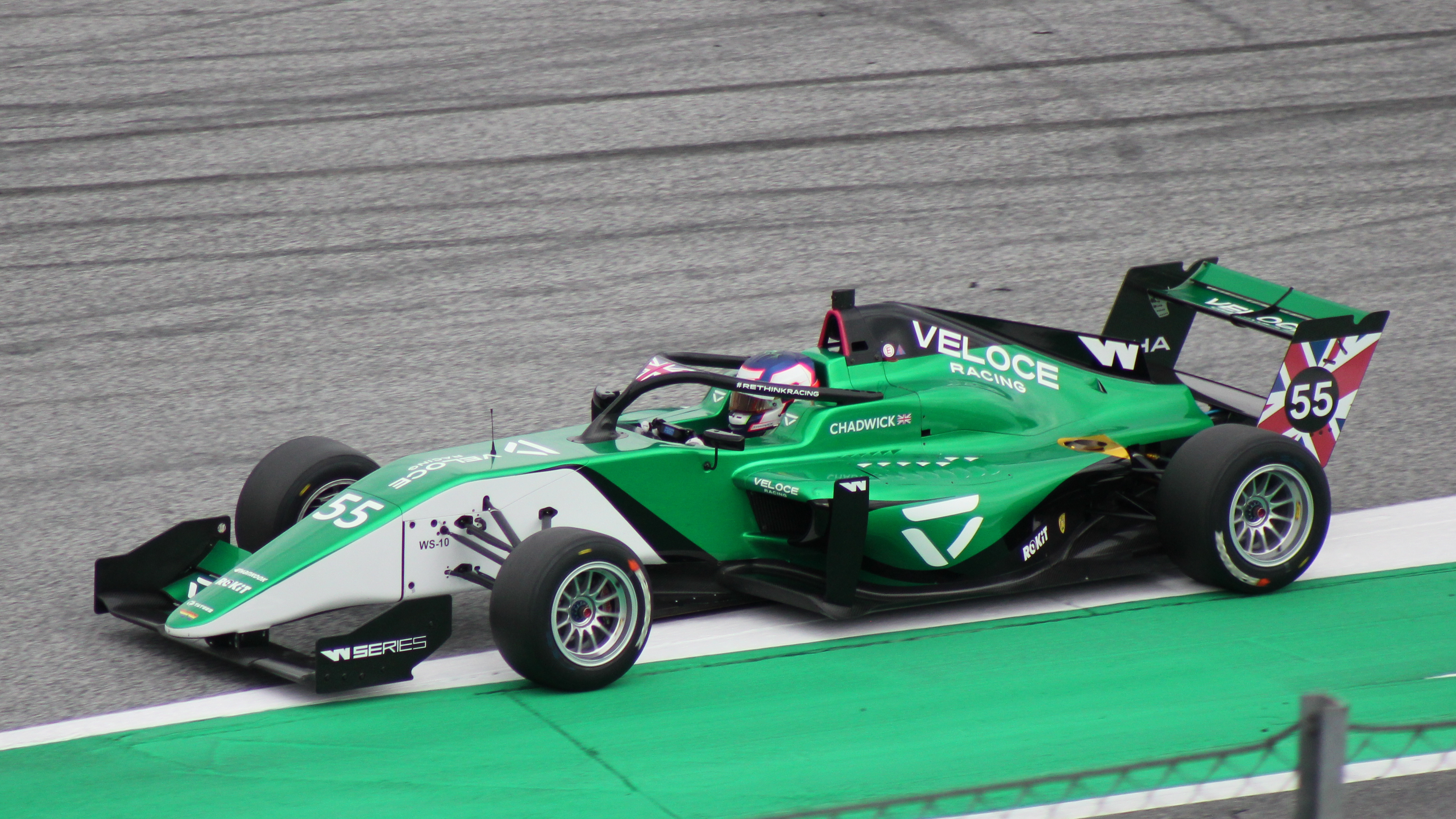
Jamie Chadwick driving for Veloce Racing during the 2021 season

Veloce joined W Series for its second season in 2021, with reigning champion Jamie Chadwick and rookie Bruna Tomaselli as their inaugural driver line-up. At the second round of the season at the Red Bull Ring, Chadwick scored the team's first pole position, podium and win in W Series, beating Beitske Visser by a tenth of a second in qualifying, and driving to a commanding victory during the race. Ahead of round 3 at Silverstone Circuit, Veloce announced Mariella Bailey as the team's W Series team principal. During the final round of the season, with her win in the second race of the weekend at Circuit of the Americas, Jamie Chadwick won her second W Series championship, and the first for Veloce.

== Extreme H ==
On 11 February 2025, Veloce became the first team to confirm its intention to enter the FIA Extreme H World Cup, the series successor of Extreme E. However, Veloce did not compete in the inaugural World Cup.

Veloce is due to return for the 2026 World Cup with Kevin Hansen and Molly Taylor. The event was postponed following the 2026 Yemen offensives.

== Results ==
=== Extreme E ===
==== Overview ====
* – Indicates cancelled season.

Extreme E results
Year	Name	Car	Tyres	No.	G.	Drivers	Rounds	Pts.	Pos.
2021	(United Kingdom) Veloce Racing	Spark Odyssey 21	C	5.	F	(United Kingdom) Jamie Chadwick (New Zealand) Emma Gilmour	(1–2, 5) (3–4)	77	7th
2021	(United Kingdom) Veloce Racing	Spark Odyssey 21	C	5.	M	(France) Stéphane Sarrazin (South Africa) Lance Woolridge	(1–4) (5)	77	7th
2022	(United Kingdom) Veloce Racing	Spark Odyssey 21	C	5.	F	(Spain) Christine GZ (Norway) Hedda Hosås (Australia) Molly Taylor	(1–4) (1) (5)	18	10th
2022	(United Kingdom) Veloce Racing	Spark Odyssey 21	C	5.	M	(Sweden) Kevin Hansen (South Africa) Lance Woolridge	(5) (1–4)	18	10th
2023	(United Kingdom) Veloce Racing	Spark Odyssey 21	C	5.	F	(Australia) Molly Taylor	(1–10)	155	3rd
2023	(United Kingdom) Veloce Racing	Spark Odyssey 21	C	5.	M	(Sweden) Kevin Hansen	(1–10)	155	3rd
2024	(United Kingdom) E.ON Veloce Racing / E.ON Next Veloce Racing	Spark Odyssey 21	C	5.	F	(Australia) Molly Taylor	(1–4)	87	1st
2024	(United Kingdom) E.ON Veloce Racing / E.ON Next Veloce Racing	Spark Odyssey 21	C	5.	M	(Sweden) Kevin Hansen	(1–4)	87	1st

==== Complete Extreme E Results ====
(Races in bold indicate best qualifiers; races in italics indicate fastest super sector)

Year	Entrant	1	2	3	4	5	6	7	8	9	10	Pts.	Pos.
2021	Veloce Racing	DES (Saudi Arabia); WD	OCE (Senegal); 2	ARC (Greenland); 6	ISL (Italy); 8	JUR (United Kingdom); 6						77	7th
2022	Veloce Racing	DES (Saudi Arabia); 10	ISL1 (Italy); 8	ISL2 (Italy); 9	COP (Chile); 10	**ENE** (Uruguay); 5						18	10th
2023	Veloce Racing	DES1 (Saudi Arabia); 1	**DES2** (Saudi Arabia); 2	HYD1 (Scotland); 7	HYD2 (Scotland); 1	ISL1 (Italy); 6	ISL2 (Italy); 7	ISL3 (Italy); 3	ISL4 (Italy); 6	COP1 (Chile); 5	COP2 (Chile); 1	155	3rd
2024	E.ON Veloce Racing / E.ON Next Veloce Racing	DES1 (Saudi Arabia); 3	DES2 (Saudi Arabia); 3	**HYD1** **(Scotland)**; 7	HYD2 (Scotland); 1							87	1st

=== W Series ===
Year	Chassis	Engine	Tyres	Drivers	1	2	3	4	5	6	7	8	Points	Position
2021	Tatuus F3	Alfa Romeo T-318	**H**		RBR1	RBR2	SIL	HUN	SPA	ZAN	COA		Points	Position
2021	Tatuus F3	Alfa Romeo T-318	**H**	(United Kingdom) Jamie Chadwick	6	1	3	1	2	2	1	1	159	1st
2021	Tatuus F3	Alfa Romeo T-318	**H**	(Brazil) Bruna Tomaselli	11	5	11	9	15	17	17	11	12	15th
