= Sara Price =

American racing driver (born 1992)

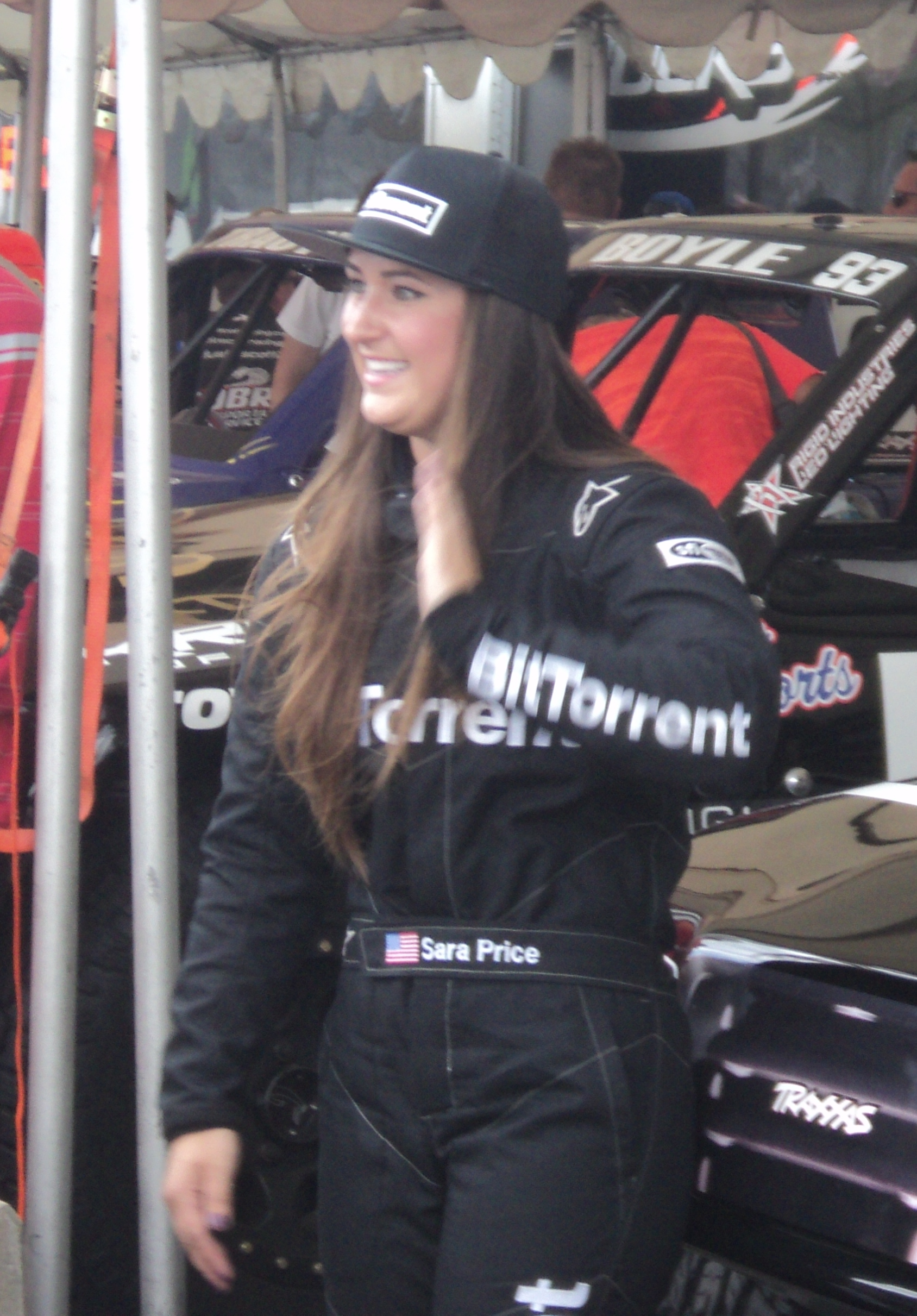
- Price at Honda Indy Toronto in 2016
- Nationality: American
- Born: Sara Michelle Price; September 2, 1992 (age 34) Riverside, California, U.S.

Extreme E career
- Debut season: 2021
- Current team: Chip Ganassi Racing
- Car number: 99
- Co-driver: Kyle LeDuc
- Starts: 5
- Best finish: 7th in 2021
- Finished last season: 7th (2021)

Stadium Super Trucks career
- Debut season: 2016
- Car number: 78
- Starts: 14
- Wins: 0
- Podiums: 0
- Poles: 0
- Fastest laps: 0
- Best finish: 11th in 2016
- Finished last season: 24th (2017)
- Statistics up to date as of February 9, 2022.

Sara Michelle Price (born September 2, 1992) is an American racing driver, having competed in motocross, rallying, the X Games, Stadium Super Trucks and Extreme E.

Price has won 17 national motocross championships and she has medaled in the X Games. She hails from Southern California and has been racing since the age of eight.

== Racing career ==
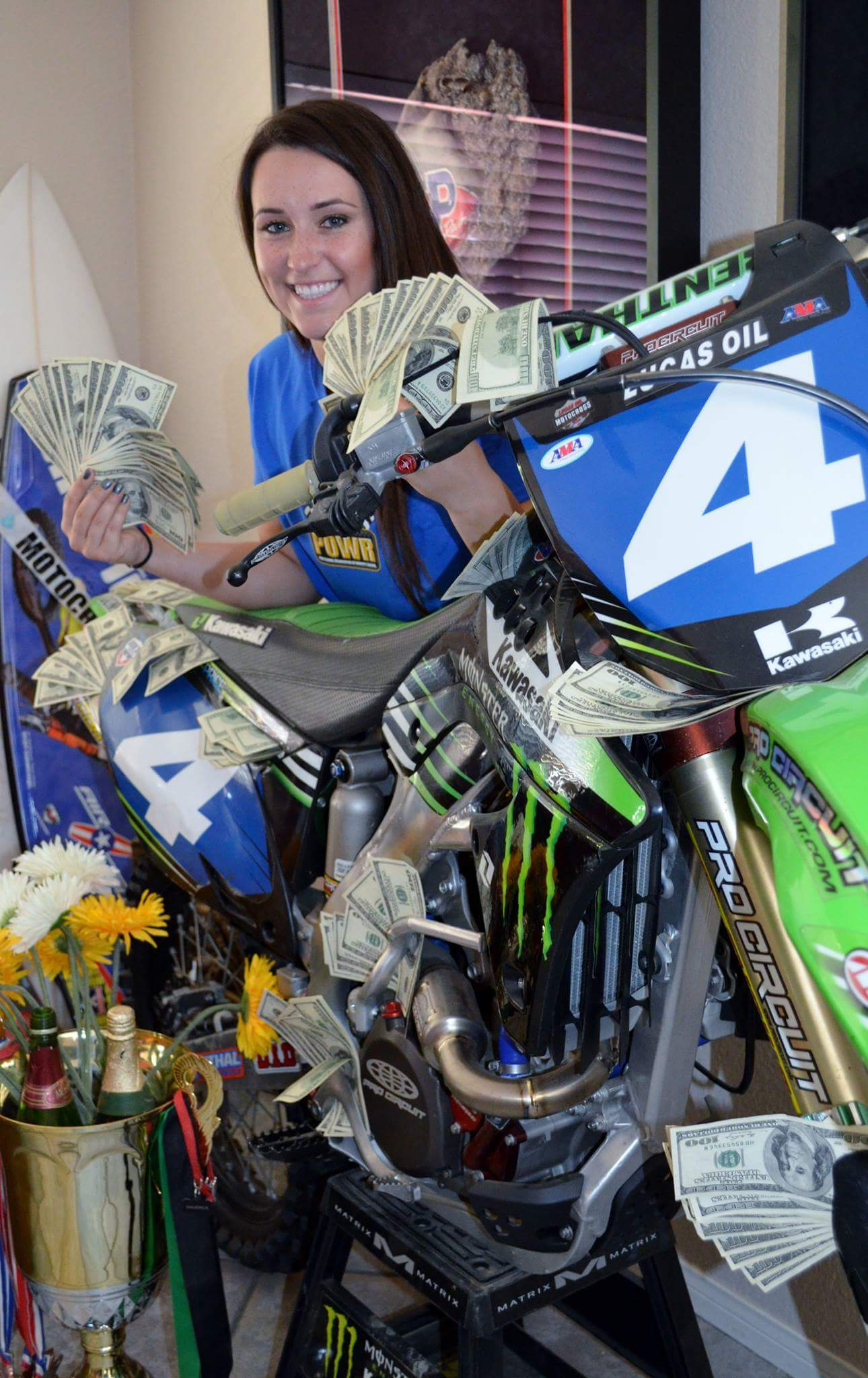
Price with her motocross bike and the cash prize for the 2014 POWR Pro Shootout

In 2010, Price became first female factory supported motocross racer to race for Monster Energy Kawasaki Racing. Over the next few years, Price raced for Monster Energy Kawasaki and medaled several times at the X Games before transitioning to racing off-road. Price placed first at the 2013 Elsinore Grand Prix and won the Terracross Championship in 2015.

In 2016, Price won the Off-road Motorsports Hall of Fame Rising Star Award in the UTV, MX, and ATV Category.

Price made her debut in Stadium Super Trucks at the 2016 Honda Indy Toronto race weekend, becoming the first female driver to compete in the series. The following year, she ran the season finale at Lake Elsinore Diamond. Price did not return to the series until 2020, racing at the Adelaide 500 race weekend.

In 2017, Price won Hoonigan and Fiat's Female Driver Search to become next female Hoonigan Athlete. She also placed 38th place at the Climb to the Clouds” at Mount Washington in a Fiat 124 Rally Car.

Price made her debut in a trophy truck in the 2017 Best in the Desert Laughlin Desert Classic and placed second.

In 2019, Price became the first female SCORE International Baja 1000 IronWoman by solo driving the entire race and finishing second in the trophy trucks spec class.

Price first raced rally in 2015 Rallye Aicha des Gazelles, finishing first among rookie participants. Price did not return to rally racing until 2020 when she placed second in the UTV Class at Sonora Rally.

On June 11, 2020, Chip Ganassi Racing announced Price would race with the team for the inaugural Extreme E season in 2021. She was the first confirmed driver for the series, and the first female racer in CGR's history.

In 2024, Price made her debut in the Dakar Rally, driving in the SSV class. In this race, she became the third female driver and first female American driver to win a Dakar stage, by winning Stage 10.

== Miss California USA ==
Price competed in the Miss California USA beauty pageant in 2013, but did not make the finals.

== Motorsports career results ==
=== Stadium Super Trucks ===
(key) (Bold – Pole position. Italics – Fastest qualifier. * – Most laps led.)

Stadium Super Trucks results
Year	1	2	3	4	5	6	7	8	9	10	11	12	13	14	15	16	17	18	19	20	21	22	SSTC	Pts	Ref
2016	ADE	ADE	ADE	STP	STP	LBH	LBH	DET	DET	DET	TOW	TOW	TOW	TOR; 8	TOR; 9	CLT; 5	CLT; 6	OCF; 4	OCF; 6	SRF; 9	SRF; 11	SRF; 6	11th	130	
2017	ADE	ADE	ADE	STP	STP	LBH	LBH	PER	PER	PER	DET	DET	TEX	TEX	HID	HID	HID	BEI	GLN	GLN	ELS; 9	ELS; DNQ	25th	25	
2020	ADE; 10	ADE; 8	ADE; 10	ROA	ROA																		N/A^{1}	–	

^{1} Standings were not recorded by the series for the 2020 season.

=== Extreme E ===
(key)

Year	Team	Car	1	2	3	4	5	6	7	8	9	10	Pos.	Points
2021	Segi TV Chip Ganassi Racing	Spark ODYSSEY 21	DES; Q 7	DES; R 8	OCE; Q 7	OCE; R 7	ARC; Q 7	ARC; R 9	ISL; Q 5	ISL; R 4	JUR; Q 8	JUR; R 8	7th	60
2022	GMC Hummer EV Chip Ganassi Racing	Spark ODYSSEY 21	DES; 4	ISL1; 1	ISL2; 7	COP; 4	ENE; 6						4th	57

=== Dakar Rally ===
Year	Class	Vehicle	Position	Stages won
2024	SSV	(Canada) Can-Am	4th	1
2025	SSV	(Canada) Can-Am	27th	0
2026	Stock	(United Kingdom) Defender	2nd	4

== Filmography ==
Year	Title	Role	Notes
2009	Semper Ride	Herself	
2016	The Grand Tour	Stunt driver	One episode
2019	Shadow Wolves	Stunt driver	One episode
2019	Jumanji: The Next Level	Stunt driver	
2020	NOS4A2	Stunt driver	Four episodes
2020	Coyote	Stunt driver	Pre-production
