= Cristina Gutiérrez =

Spanish rally raid driver

Cristina Gutiérrez Herrero
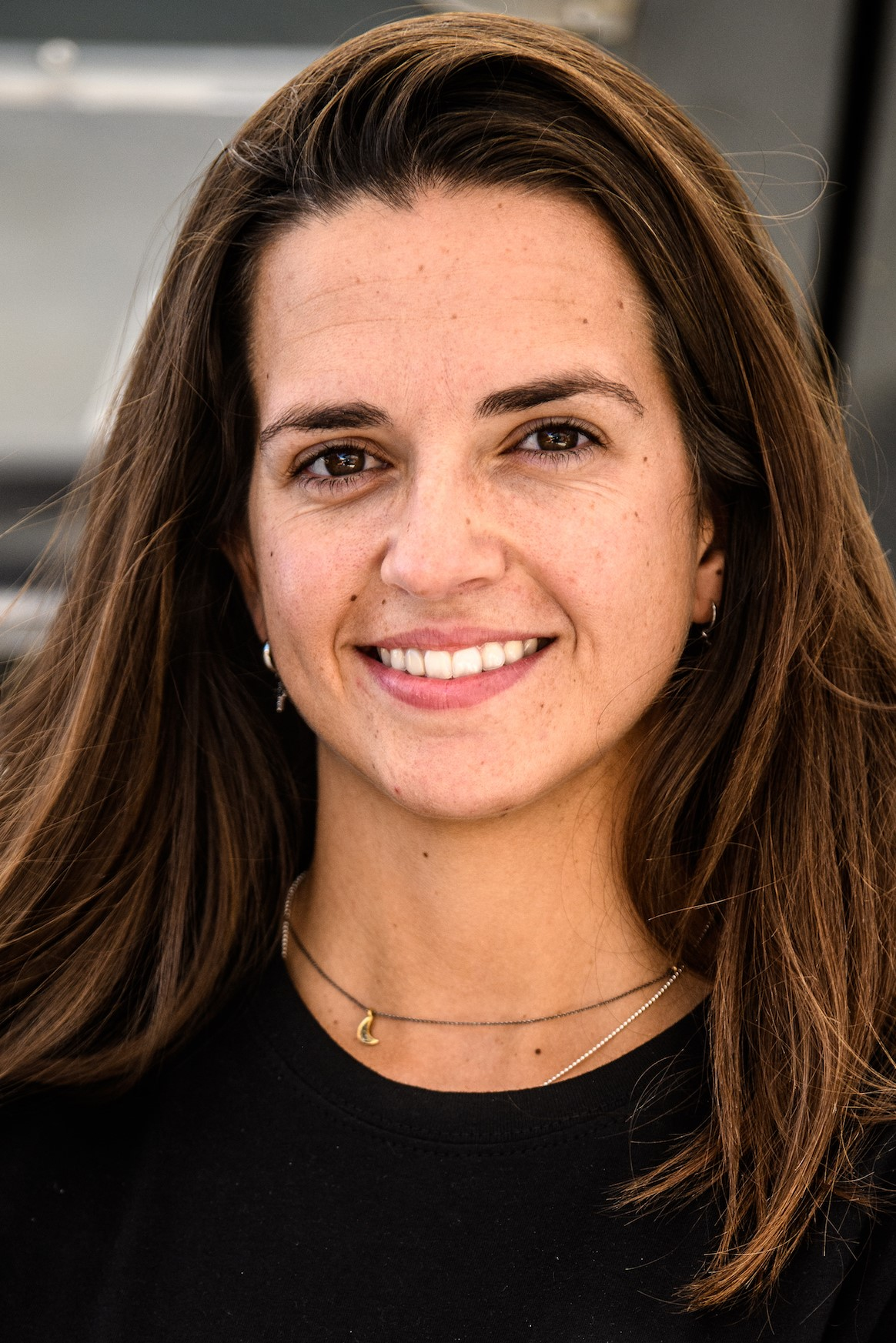
- Nationality: Spanish
- Full name: Cristina Gutiérrez Herrero
- Born: 24 July 1991 (age 35) Burgos, Spain

Extreme E
- Former teams: Team X44, McLaren XE
- Starts: 20
- Championships: 1 (2022)
- Wins: 4
- Poles: 8
- Fastest laps: 5
- Finished last season: 4th (2023)

Previous series
- 2017–25: Dakar Rally

Championship titles
- 2024: 1

Cristina Gutiérrez Herrero (born 24 July 1991) is a Spanish dentist and rally raid driver.

Gutiérrez became the first Spanish female car driver to finish the Dakar Rally in 2017. In 2021 she was the second woman to win a stage in Dakar Rally history. She won the 2024 edition in the T3 category.

In 2021, Gutiérrez won the FIA World Cup for Cross-Country Rallies in the T3 category, becoming the first-ever female driver to claim it.

In 2022, Gutiérrez won the Extreme E electric cross-country series alongside Sébastien Loeb for Lewis Hamilton's Team X44, making her the first Spaniard to ever win it.

== Racing career ==
=== Early career ===
Gutiérrez debuted in rally raid in 2010 at age eighteen. She was overall runner-up at the 2015 Spanish Off-Road Rally Championship.

=== Dakar Rally ===
Gutiérrez debuted her international rally career in the 2017 Dakar Rally, racing in a modified Mitsubishi Pajero. Gutiérrez's first race was a success. She finished 44th overall and sixth in the T1.S class, in a race where 27% of class entrants did not manage to complete the course. This made her the first woman from Spain to ever finish the off-road classic. In 2018, she finished second in the T1.S class, again driving a Mitsubishi Montero. The Spaniard finished seventh in the T1.2 class in 2019 and 2020, both driving a Mitsubishi Eclipse Cross.

In the 2021 Dakar Rally, Gutiérrez competed in the T3.1 lightweight vehicles category on an OT3-01. She became only the second woman ever (after Jutta Kleinschmidt in 2005) to win a Dakar stage, however she retired in stage 8.

In the 2022 Dakar Rally, Gutiérrez was the first Spanish woman to reach the podium of the Dakar Rally, when she and co-driver François Cazalet finished third in the Light Prototype (T3) category driving a Red Bull OT3 prototype.

In the 2023 Dakar Rally, Gutiérrez finished in fourth position in the T3 category, after having many issues in the first week that prevented her from fighting for the victory. Nonetheless, she won the prologue stage and the last stage, being the only woman ever do it so after Jutta Kleinschmidt.

In the 2024 Dakar Rally, Gutiérrez claimed the win in the Challenger category (formerly known as T3), as she profited from a late issue for leader Mitch Guthrie. She became the second woman in history to achieve this feat, following Jutta Kleinschmidt's victory in 2001. She is also the first Spanish woman to ever win at the Dakar Rally.

=== Extreme E ===
In December 2020, Gutiérrez was announced as the female driver for Lewis Hamilton's Team X44 in Extreme E, partnering with Sébastien Loeb. They finished the season in second behind Rosberg X Racing's Johan Kristoffersson and Molly Taylor. The teams were level on points but RXR were ahead on virtue of their three wins to X44's one win.

Loeb and Gutiérrez were re-signed to Team X44 for 2022, for Extreme-E's second season. Team X44, with Gutiérrez and Loeb, ended up winning the second season of Extreme-E championship in the last race.

Gutiérrez moved to McLaren XE for 2024 and will partner Mattias Ekström. On September 6, a week before the scheduled Island X-Prix, Extreme E announced that the rounds in Sardinia and Phoenix were cancelled as it said it was “reviewing alternative solutions” to finish the season.

=== Other series ===
Gutiérrez has also been her country's Women's Off-Road Champion since 2012, and outright vice-champion in the same discipline in 2015 following a series of second places in Spanish Bajas. She won six consecutive times in the Women's Class of the Spanish TT Rally Championship.

In 2021, Gutiérrez became the first female driver to win an FIA World Cup for the Cross-Country Rallies title. She completed the last stage with a broken back.

== Racing record ==
=== Dakar Rally ===
Year	Class	Vehicle	Position	Stages won
2017	Cars	(Japan) Mitsubishi	44th	0
2018	Cars	(Japan) Mitsubishi	38th	0
2019	Cars	(Japan) Mitsubishi	26th	0
2020	Cars	(Japan) Mitsubishi	42nd	0
2021	T3	(Belgium) (Austria) OT3	DNF	3
2022	T3	(Belgium) (Austria) OT3	3rd	0
2023	T3	(Canada) Can-Am	4th	2
2024	T3	(Netherlands) Taurus	1st	1
2025	Cars	(Romania) Dacia	40th	0
2026	Cars	(Romania) Dacia	11th	0

=== Complete Extreme E results ===
(key)

Year	Team	Car	1	2	3	4	5	6	7	8	9	10	Pos.	Points
2021	Team X44	Spark ODYSSEY 21	DES; Q 1	DES; R 3	OCE; Q 1	OCE; R 4	ARC; Q 1	ARC; R 4	ISL; Q 1	ISL; R 5	JUR; Q 1	JUR; R 1	2nd	121
2022	X44 Vida Carbon Racing	Spark ODYSSEY 21	DES; 3	ISL1; 6	ISL2; 2	COP; 1	ENE; 3						1st	73
2023	X44 Vida Carbon Racing	Spark ODYSSEY 21	DES; 1; 4	DES; 2; 6	HYD; 1; 1	HYD; 2; 9	ISL1; 1; 8	ISL1; 2; 8	ISL2; 1; 9	ISL2; 2; 1	COP; 1; 3	COP; 2; 3	4th	109
2024	Neom McLaren Extreme E Team	Spark ODYSSEY 21	DES; 1; 2	DES; 2; 5	HYD; 1; 8	HYD; 2; 5	ISL1; 1 C	ISL1; 2 C	ISL2; 1 C	ISL2; 2 C	VAL; 1 C	VAL; 2 C	5th ^{†}	46 ^{†}

^{†} Season abandoned.

=== Complete World Rally-Raid Championship results ===
(key)

Year	Team	Car	Class	1	2	3	4	5	Pos.	Points
2022	Red Bull Off-Road Team USA	Overdrive Racing OT3	T3	DAK; 2^{72}	ABU; 2^{44}	MOR; 3^{38}	AND; 4^{13}		3rd	167
2023	Red Bull Can-Am Factory Team	BRP Can-Am Maverick XRS	T3	DAK; 3^{52}	ABU; Ret	SON; 4^{26}	DES; 2^{32}	MOR; 3^{28}	4th	138
2025	Dacia Sandriders	Dacia Sandrider	Ultimate	DAK; 91^{6}	ABU	ZAF	PRT; 8^{14}	MOR; 9^{8}	18th	28
2026	The Dacia Sandriders	Dacia Sandrider	Ultimate	DAK; 11^{11}	PRT	DES	MOR	ABU	15th*	11*

^{*}Season still in progress.
