= 2022 Island X-Prix =

2022 Island X-Prix I
Round 2 of 5 of the 2022 Extreme E Championship
← Previous race	Next race →

Race details
- Date: 6–7 July 2022
- Official name: 2022 Neom Island X-Prix I
- Location: Capo Teulada, Sardinia, Italy
- Course: Dry earth, ruts
- Course length: 6.3 km (3.9 miles)
- Distance: 2 laps, 12.6 km (7.8 miles)

Pole position
Drivers	(Sweden) Mikaela Åhlin-Kottulinsky; (Sweden) Johan Kristoffersson	Rosberg X Racing

Podium
First	(United States) Kyle LeDuc; (United States) Sara Price	Chip Ganassi Racing
Second	(Germany) Timo Scheider; (Italy) Tamara Molinaro	Xite Energy Racing
Third	(Norway) Hedda Hosås; (Sweden) Kevin Hansen	JBXE

2022 Island X-Prix II
Round 3 of 5 of the 2022 Extreme E Championship
← Previous race	Next race →

Race details
- Date: 9–10 July 2022
- Official name: 2022 Neom Island X-Prix II
- Location: Capo Teulada, Sardinia, Italy
- Course: Sand, clay, rock
- Course length: 6.3 km (3.9 miles)
- Distance: 2 laps, 12.6 km (7.8 miles)

Pole position
Drivers	(Sweden) Mikaela Åhlin-Kottulinsky; (Sweden) Johan Kristoffersson	Rosberg X Racing

Podium
First	(Sweden) Johan Kristoffersson; (Sweden) Mikaela Åhlin-Kottulinsky	Rosberg X Racing
Second	(France) Sébastien Loeb; (Spain) Cristina Gutiérrez	Team X44
Third	(Sweden) Timmy Hansen; (United Kingdom) Catie Munnings	Andretti United XE

The 2022 Island X-Prix (formally the 2022 Neom Island X-Prix) was a pair of Extreme E off-road races that was held on 6, 7, 9 and 10 July 2022 at Capo Teulada, in the Sulcis-Iglesiente region of the Italian island of Sardinia. It marked the second and third rounds of the electric off-road racing car series' second season, as well as the second running of the event. Though initially scheduled to host only the second round in May, it was later turned into a double header and postponed to July when the third round, originally planned to take place in Scotland or Senegal, was cancelled due to financial issues. As such, the two events were treated as separate competitions and distinguished in official documents as the "Island X-Prix I" and "Island X-Prix II".

Kyle LeDuc and Sara Price won their first X-Prix for GMC Hummer EV Chip Ganassi Racing in the first round, ahead of Xite Energy Racing and JBXE, after a penalty for on-track winners Rosberg X Racing. Championship leaders Johan Kristoffersson and Mikaela Åhlin-Kottulinsky from Rosberg X Racing dominated the second event, with Team X44 and Genesys Andretti United Extreme E rounding out the podium.

== Classification ==
=== Round 2 ===
==== Qualifying ====
Qualifying 2 draw
Heat 1	(Germany) Rosberg X Racing	(United States) Andretti United XE	(Spain) Xite Energy Racing	(United Kingdom) Team X44	(United States) Chip Ganassi Racing
Heat 2	(Spain) Acciona | Sainz XE	(Germany) Abt Cupra XE	(United Kingdom) JBXE	(United Kingdom) McLaren XE	(United Kingdom) Veloce Racing

Pos.	No.	Team	Drivers	Q1			Q2			Combined
Pos.	No.	Team	Drivers	Laps	Time	CP	Laps	Time	CP	Combined
1	6	(Germany) Rosberg X Racing	(Sweden) Mikaela Åhlin-Kottulinsky (Sweden) Johan Kristoffersson	2	9:13.966	10	2	9:58.521	10	20
2	55	(Spain) Acciona | Sainz XE Team	(Spain) Laia Sanz (Spain) Carlos Sainz	2	9:25.859	9	2	9:32.591	10	19
3	44	(United Kingdom) Team X44	(France) Sébastien Loeb (Spain) Cristina Gutiérrez	2	11:20.974	4	2	10:07.542	8	12
4	23	(United States) Genesys Andretti United Extreme E	(Sweden) Timmy Hansen (United Kingdom) Catie Munnings	2	9:26.977	8	2	10:14.019	4	12
5	42	(Spain) Xite Energy Racing	(Italy) Tamara Molinaro (Germany) Timo Scheider	2	9:32.482	6	2	10:12.180	6	12
6	22	(United Kingdom) JBXE	(Sweden) Kevin Hansen (Norway) Hedda Hosås	2	9:44.426	5	2	9:43.052	6	11
7	125	(Germany) Abt Cupra XE	(Qatar) Nasser Al-Attiyah (Germany) Jutta Kleinschmidt	2	9:29.710	7	2	9:49.593	2	9
8	58	(United Kingdom) Neom McLaren Extreme E	(New Zealand) Emma Gilmour (United States) Tanner Foust	1	8:49.866	0	2	9:42.824	8	8
9	5	(United Kingdom) Veloce Racing	(South Africa) Lance Woolridge (Spain) Christine GZ	0	No time	0	2	9:48.772	4	4
10	99	(United States) GMC Hummer EV Chip Ganassi Racing	(United States) Sara Price (United States) Kyle LeDuc	1	4:02.753	0	0	No time	0	0

Key
Colour	Advance to
Black	Semi-Final 1
Silver	Semi-Final 2
Bronze	Crazy Race
Gold	Final

Notes:

- Tie-breakers were determined by Super Sector times.

==== Semi-final 1 ====
Pos.	No.	Team	Drivers	Laps	Time	Points
1	6	(Germany) Rosberg X Racing	(Sweden) Mikaela Åhlin-Kottulinsky (Sweden) Johan Kristoffersson	2	9:23.321	
2	42	(Spain) Xite Energy Racing	(Italy) Tamara Molinaro (Germany) Timo Scheider	2	+18.752	
3	23	(United States) Genesys Andretti United Extreme E	(Sweden) Timmy Hansen (United Kingdom) Catie Munnings	2	+53.005	6

==== Semi-final 2 ====
Pos.	No.	Team	Drivers	Laps	Time	Points
1	22	(United Kingdom) JBXE	(Sweden) Kevin Hansen (Norway) Hedda Hosås	2	9:39.054	
2	55	(Spain) Acciona | Sainz XE Team	(Spain) Laia Sanz (Spain) Carlos Sainz	2	+4.948	
3	44	(United Kingdom) Team X44	(France) Sébastien Loeb (Spain) Cristina Gutiérrez	2	+21.174	8

==== Crazy Race ====
Pos.	No.	Team	Drivers	Laps	Time	Points
1	99	(United States) GMC Hummer EV Chip Ganassi Racing	(United States) Sara Price (United States) Kyle LeDuc	2	10:22.991	
2	5	(United Kingdom) Veloce Racing	(South Africa) Lance Woolridge (Spain) Christine GZ	2	+19.226	4
3	125	(Germany) Abt Cupra XE	(Qatar) Nasser Al-Attiyah (Germany) Jutta Kleinschmidt	2	+22.128^{1}	2
4	58	(United Kingdom) Neom McLaren Extreme E	(New Zealand) Emma Gilmour (United States) Tanner Foust	0	+2 laps	1

Notes:

- ^1 – Abt Cupra XE originally finished first, but later received a 10-second time penalty for taking down a waypoint flag and a 22-second time penalty for failing to reach the minimum driver switch time in the switch zone.

==== Final ====
Pos.	No.	Team	Drivers	Laps	Time	Points
1	99	(United States) GMC Hummer EV Chip Ganassi Racing	(United States) Kyle LeDuc (United States) Sara Price	2	26:12.396	25
2	42	(Spain) Xite Energy Racing	(Germany) Timo Scheider (Italy) Tamara Molinaro	2	+11.853	18
3	22	(United Kingdom) JBXE	(Norway) Hedda Hosås (Sweden) Kevin Hansen	2	+23.434^{2}	15
4	55	(Spain) Acciona | Sainz XE Team	(Spain) Carlos Sainz (Spain) Laia Sanz	0	+2 laps	12
5	6	(Germany) Rosberg X Racing	(Sweden) Johan Kristoffersson (Sweden) Mikaela Åhlin-Kottulinsky	2	26:02.033^{3}	10+5^{1}

Notes:

- The race was red-flagged at the end of lap 1 after a crash between Rosberg X Racing's Johan Kristoffersson and Acciona | Sainz's Carlos Sainz that took the latter out of the race. All four other teams took the restart, with the gaps maintained.
- ^1 – Team awarded 5 additional points for being fastest in the Super Sector.
- ^2 – JBXE received a 7-second time penalty for taking down a waypoint flag.
- ^3 – Rosberg X Racing originally finished first, but was later penalised for causing the collision with the Acciona | Sainz XE Team. This was initially in the form of a 30-second time penalty. However, after new evidence became available and Acciona | Sainz appealed the decision, on 19 August (six weeks after the incident) the initial time penalty was cancelled and Rosberg X Racing was demoted to last place.

=== Round 3 ===
==== Qualifying ====
Qualifying 2 draw
Heat 1	(Germany) Rosberg X Racing	(United Kingdom) Team X44	(United States) Andretti United XE	(United Kingdom) JBXE	(Spain) Xite Energy Racing
Heat 2	(United States) Chip Ganassi Racing	(United Kingdom) McLaren XE	(Germany) Abt Cupra XE	(Spain) Acciona | Sainz XE	(United Kingdom) Veloce Racing

Pos.	No.	Team	Drivers	Q1			Q2			Combined
Pos.	No.	Team	Drivers	Laps	Time	CP	Laps	Time	CP	Combined
1	6	(Germany) Rosberg X Racing	(Sweden) Mikaela Åhlin-Kottulinsky (Sweden) Johan Kristoffersson	2	9:00.503	10	2	9:12.199	10	20
2	44	(United Kingdom) Team X44	(Spain) Cristina Gutiérrez (France) Sébastien Loeb	2	9:11.877	8	2	9:35.424	8	16
3	58	(United Kingdom) Neom McLaren Extreme E	(New Zealand) Emma Gilmour (United States) Tanner Foust	2	9:15.629	7	2	9:27.234	8	15
4	55	(Spain) Acciona | Sainz XE Team	(Spain) Laia Sanz (Spain) Carlos Sainz	2	9:22.204	3	2	9:22.515	10	13
5	99	(United States) GMC Hummer EV Chip Ganassi Racing	(United States) Sara Price (United States) Kyle LeDuc	2	9:11.244	9	2	10:12.776	2	11
6	125	(Germany) Abt Cupra XE	(Germany) Jutta Kleinschmidt (Qatar) Nasser Al-Attiyah	2	9:17.422	5	2	9:35.697	6	11
7	22	(United Kingdom) JBXE	(Norway) Hedda Hosås (Sweden) Kevin Hansen	2	9:22.137	4	2	9:43.437	6	10
8	23	(United States) Genesys Andretti United Extreme E	(United Kingdom) Catie Munnings (Sweden) Timmy Hansen	2	9:15.706	6	1	10:52.140	0	6
9	42	(Spain) Xite Energy Racing	(Italy) Tamara Molinaro (Germany) Timo Scheider	2	9:23.420	2	2	10:05.476	4	6
10	5	(United Kingdom) Veloce Racing	(South Africa) Lance Woolridge (Spain) Christine GZ	2	9:34.568	1	2	9:51.878	4	5

Key
Colour	Advance to
Black	Semi-Final 1
Silver	Semi-Final 2
Bronze	Crazy Race
Gold	Final

Notes:

- Tie-breakers were determined by Super Sector times.

==== Semi-final 1 ====
Pos.	No.	Team	Drivers	Laps	Time	Points
1	6	(Germany) Rosberg X Racing	(Sweden) Mikaela Åhlin-Kottulinsky (Sweden) Johan Kristoffersson	2	9:19.987	
2	55	(Spain) Acciona | Sainz XE Team	(Spain) Laia Sanz (Spain) Carlos Sainz	2	+8.956	
3	99	(United States) GMC Hummer EV Chip Ganassi Racing	(United States) Sara Price (United States) Kyle LeDuc	0	+2 laps	6

==== Semi-final 2 ====
Pos.	No.	Team	Drivers	Laps	Time	Points
1	44	(United Kingdom) Team X44	(Spain) Cristina Gutiérrez (France) Sébastien Loeb	2	9:18.618	
2	125	(Germany) Abt Cupra XE	(Germany) Jutta Kleinschmidt (Qatar) Nasser Al-Attiyah	2	+4.008	
3	58	(United Kingdom) Neom McLaren Extreme E	(New Zealand) Emma Gilmour (United States) Tanner Foust	2	+19.453	8

==== Crazy Race ====
Pos.	No.	Team	Drivers	Laps	Time	Points
1	23	(United States) Genesys Andretti United Extreme E	(United Kingdom) Catie Munnings (Sweden) Timmy Hansen	2	9:21.335	
2	22	(United Kingdom) JBXE	(Norway) Hedda Hosås (Sweden) Kevin Hansen	2	+20.538	4
3	5	(United Kingdom) Veloce Racing	(South Africa) Lance Woolridge (Spain) Christine GZ	2	+48.232	2
4	42	(Spain) Xite Energy Racing	(Italy) Tamara Molinaro (Germany) Timo Scheider	1	+1 lap	1

==== Final ====
Pos.	No.	Team	Drivers	Laps	Time	Points
1	6	(Germany) Rosberg X Racing	(Sweden) Johan Kristoffersson (Sweden) Mikaela Åhlin-Kottulinsky	2	9:12.668	25+5^{1}
2	44	(United Kingdom) Team X44	(France) Sébastien Loeb (Spain) Cristina Gutiérrez	2	+8.227	18
3	23	(United States) Genesys Andretti United Extreme E	(Sweden) Timmy Hansen (United Kingdom) Catie Munnings	2	+12.884	15
4	55	(Spain) Acciona | Sainz XE Team	(Spain) Carlos Sainz (Spain) Laia Sanz	0	+2 laps	12
DSQ	125	(Germany) Abt Cupra XE	(Qatar) Nasser Al-Attiyah (Germany) Jutta Kleinschmidt	2	Disqualified^{2}	0

Notes:

- ^1 – Team awarded 5 additional points for being fastest in the Super Sector.
- ^2 – Abt Cupra XE originally finished second, but was later disqualified for Jutta Kleinschmidt not fitting her right shoulder strap during the driver switch and driving a lap not fastened. As a result, the team got 0 points from the event.

Previous race: 2022 Desert X-Prix	Extreme E Championship; 2022 season	Next race: 2022 Copper X-Prix
Previous race: 2021 Island X-Prix	Island X-Prix	Next race: 2023 Island X-Prix
