= Tamara Molinaro =

Italian rally driver

- Nationality: (Italy) Italian
- Born: 10 October 1997 (age 29) Como, Italy

Extreme E career
- Debut season: 2022
- Former teams: Xite Energy Racing, McLaren XE, JBXE
- Starts: 9
- Wins: 0
- Podiums: 1
- Poles: 0
- Best finish: 11th in 2022

Championship titles
- 2017: FIA European Rally Championship Ladies' Trophy

Tamara Molinaro (born 10 October 1997) is an Italian rally driver who most recently raced at JBXE and as the championship reserve driver at Extreme E. She won the FIA European Rally Championship Ladies' Trophy in 2017 before moving on to World Rally Championship-2, TitansRX and the Italian Gravel Championship, where she is a double ladies' champion. She has also occasionally competed as a co-driver, most notably partnering Craig Breen in selected Italian and Sammarinese rounds.

== Biography ==
Molinaro began rallying in 2008 at the age of 11 under the mentorship of long-time family friend Gigi Galli, and started her career as a co-driver for Galli and Swiss driver Luca Maspoli. She was picked up by Red Bull early on in her career as one of their sponsored athletes.

Molinaro progressed into driving in 2013, competing in several regional rallies in Italy, aboard a Citroën C2. In 2016, she switched the Citroën for an Opel Adam R2, taking part in a series of Austrian and German events alongside Ilka Minor. The following year she entered the FIA European Rally Championship in the same car, coming seventh in the Junior U27 and winning the title in the Ladies' Trophy.

2017 would also see Molinaro make her World Rally Championship debut, coming 49th at the Rallye Deutschland alongside Veronica Gulbæk Engan. She also co-drove for Craig Breen for the first time, at the Monza Rally Show in December. In 2018, she entered a single ERC event at the Rallye Açores, and made a further WRC appearance at the Rally Sweden, both in a Ford Fiesta R5 co-driven by Martijn Wydaeghe. She repeated at the Rally Sweden the following season in a Citroën C3 R5 together with Lorenzo Granai, achieving her best championship result with 28th place overall and 11th place in WRC-2.

Molinaro's main programme for 2019 though was a rallycross debut in the newly rebranded TitansRX International Europe Series, where she finished fifth in a Hyundai i30, in a championship won by WRX event-winner Kevin Hansen. In 2020 and 2021, Molinaro contested the Italian Gravel Championship, where she finished tenth and seventh respectively, winning the ladies' trophy in both cases.

In July 2021, Molinaro joined the new electric off-road racing series Extreme E as the championship's female reserve driver after her predecessor, Jutta Kleinschmidt, was signed by Abt Cupra XE for the remainder of the season. Molinaro remained in the championship into 2022, where she got her debut at the season-opening Desert X-Prix in Saudi Arabia, replacing Xite Energy Racing's Klara Andersson who had tested positive for COVID-19. She impressed, outpacing teammate Oliver Bennett and almost qualifying for the final race. She was retained as the championship reserve driver for the 2023 season. In September 2023, Molinaro became McLaren's second female driver in history when she substituted Emma Gilmour at McLaren XE for Round 7 at the 2023 Island X-Prix II after Gilmour suffered a fractured rib and a concussion following a crash during the first free practice session. In her debut race start for McLaren in Round 7's redemption race, Molinaro collided with JBXE's Hedda Hosås on the run down to the first jump at the start of the race and rolled the car. Molinaro was uninjured but McLaren had to withdraw from Round 8 due to the extensive damage to the spare car. For the final two rounds of the season, Molinaro replaced Hosås at JBXE, who in turn replaced Gilmour at McLaren due to Gilmour still recovering from her injury.

== Racing record ==
=== Complete WRC results ===
Year	Entrant	Car	1	2	3	4	5	6	7	8	9	10	11	12	13	14	WDC	Points
2017	Tamara Molinaro	Opel Adam R2	MON	SWE	MEX	FRA	ARG	POR	ITA	POL	FIN	GER; 49	ESP	GBR	AUS		NC	0
2018	Tamara Molinaro	Ford Fiesta R5	MON	SWE; 35	MEX	FRA	ARG	POR	ITA	FIN	GER	TUR	GBR	ESP	AUS		NC	0
2019	Tamara Molinaro	Citroën C3 R5	MON	SWE; 28	MEX	FRA	ARG	CHL	POR	ITA	FIN	GER	TUR	GBR	ESP	AUS; C	NC	0

=== Complete WRC-2 results ===
Year	Entrant	Car	1	2	3	4	5	6	7	8	9	10	11	12	13	14	WDC	Points
2019	Tamara Molinaro	Citroën C3 R5	MON	SWE; 11	MEX	FRA	ARG	CHL	POR	ITA	FIN	GER	TUR	GBR	ESP	AUS; C	NC	0

=== Complete Extreme E results ===
(key)

Year	Team	Car	1	2	3	4	5	6	7	8	9	10	Pos.	Points
2022	Xite Energy Racing	Spark ODYSSEY 21	DES; 6	ISL1; 2	ISL2; 10	COP; 9	ENE; 8						11th	32
2023	Neom McLaren Extreme E Team	Spark ODYSSEY 21	DES; 1	DES; 2	HYD; 1	HYD; 2	ISL1; 1	ISL1; 2	ISL2; 1; 10	ISL2; 2 DNS			17th	9
2023	JBXE	Spark ODYSSEY 21									COP; 1; 8	COP; 2; 8	17th	9
