= 2021 Extreme E Championship =

Electric car racing season

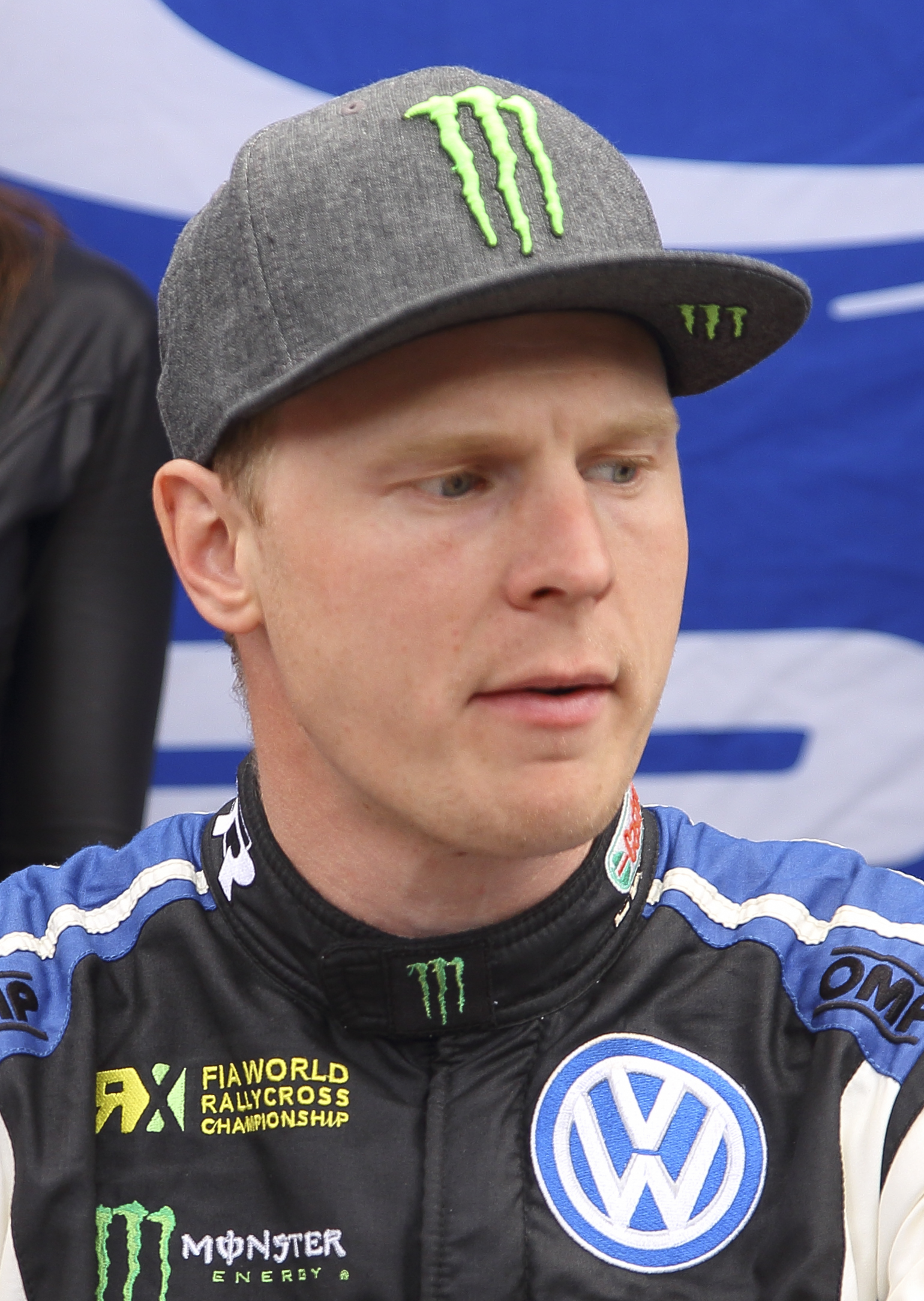
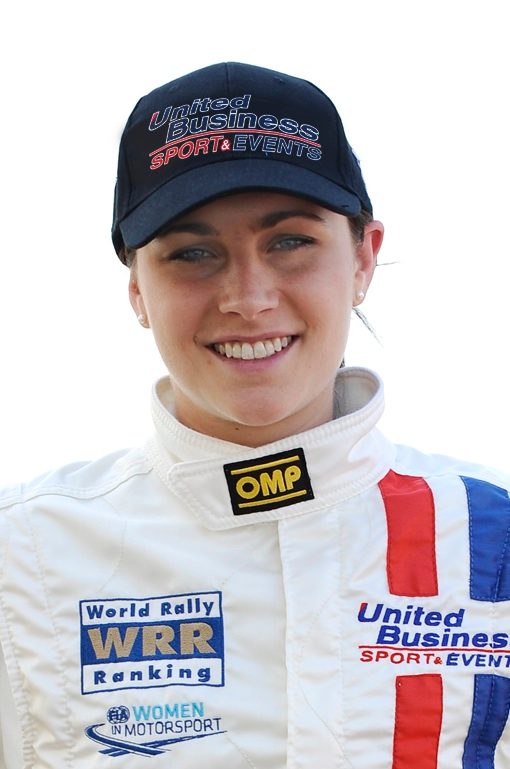
Johan Kristoffersson (left) and Molly Taylor (right) won the championship for Rosberg X Racing.

The 2021 Extreme E Championship was the inaugural season of the Extreme E electric off-road racing series. It started on 3 April with the Desert X-Prix in Saudi Arabia.

== Calendar ==
A provisional race schedule was announced on 17 December 2019, which would have seen a season start in January 2021 with an event in Senegal. But because of delays due to the COVID-19 pandemic the start of the season was pushed back to spring 2021, and a race in Patagonia was presented to replace a Nepal-based event. On 11 June 2021, both South American events –planned to be held in Ushuaia, Argentina and Santarém, Brazil– were cancelled, with championship CEO Alejandro Agag stating they are "seeking alternate destinations". In late July, the Island X-Prix on Sardinia was announced as the first replacement race. A Jurassic X-Prix, due to take place in Dorset, was revealed in October as the new season finale.

Locations of the 2021 races

Round	Dates	Event	Location
1	3–4 April 2021	Desert X-Prix	Al-'Ula, Saudi Arabia
2	29–30 May 2021	Ocean X-Prix	Lac Rose, Senegal
3	28–29 August 2021	Arctic X-Prix	Kangerlussuaq, Greenland
4	23–24 October 2021	Island X-Prix	Sardinia, Italy
5	18–19 December 2021	Jurassic X-Prix	Dorset, United Kingdom

The following events were cancelled due to the COVID-19 pandemic:

Original Dates	Event	Location
14–15 May 2021	Mountain X-Prix	Kali Gandaki Gorge, Nepal
23–24 October 2021	Amazon X-Prix	Santarém, Brazil
11–12 December 2021	Glacier X-Prix	Ushuaia, Argentina

=== Race format ===
A race weekend consists of two rounds of qualifying time trials on Saturday, followed by multi-car races on Sunday. At the Desert X-Prix all races were intended for three cars: a semi-final from which two teams advanced to the final, a "crazy race" from which only one team advanced and a shoot-out for the bottom three places, culminating in a three-car final. The format was tweaked for round two in Senegal, where two teams each from two semi-finals advance to the final which is competed by four teams. Additionally, a "super sector" is introduced, where five extra points are awarded to the fastest team through that sector over the whole weekend. Further alterations were introduced for round three in Greenland, most notably a five-car final with one team progressing from the erstwhile shoot-out, now called "crazy race". An intermediate classification points system was also implemented, with teams receiving points from 9 down to 1 according to their place in each qualifying session; the sum of these, rather than aggregate times, determining their overall qualifying position. These classification points would not contribute to overall championship points. Another rule adjustment was introduced at the season finale in Dorset to accommodate the short nature of the circuit, each session now consisting of three laps, with the starting driver, who in the final would be the female driver, taking the first two.

== Teams and drivers ==
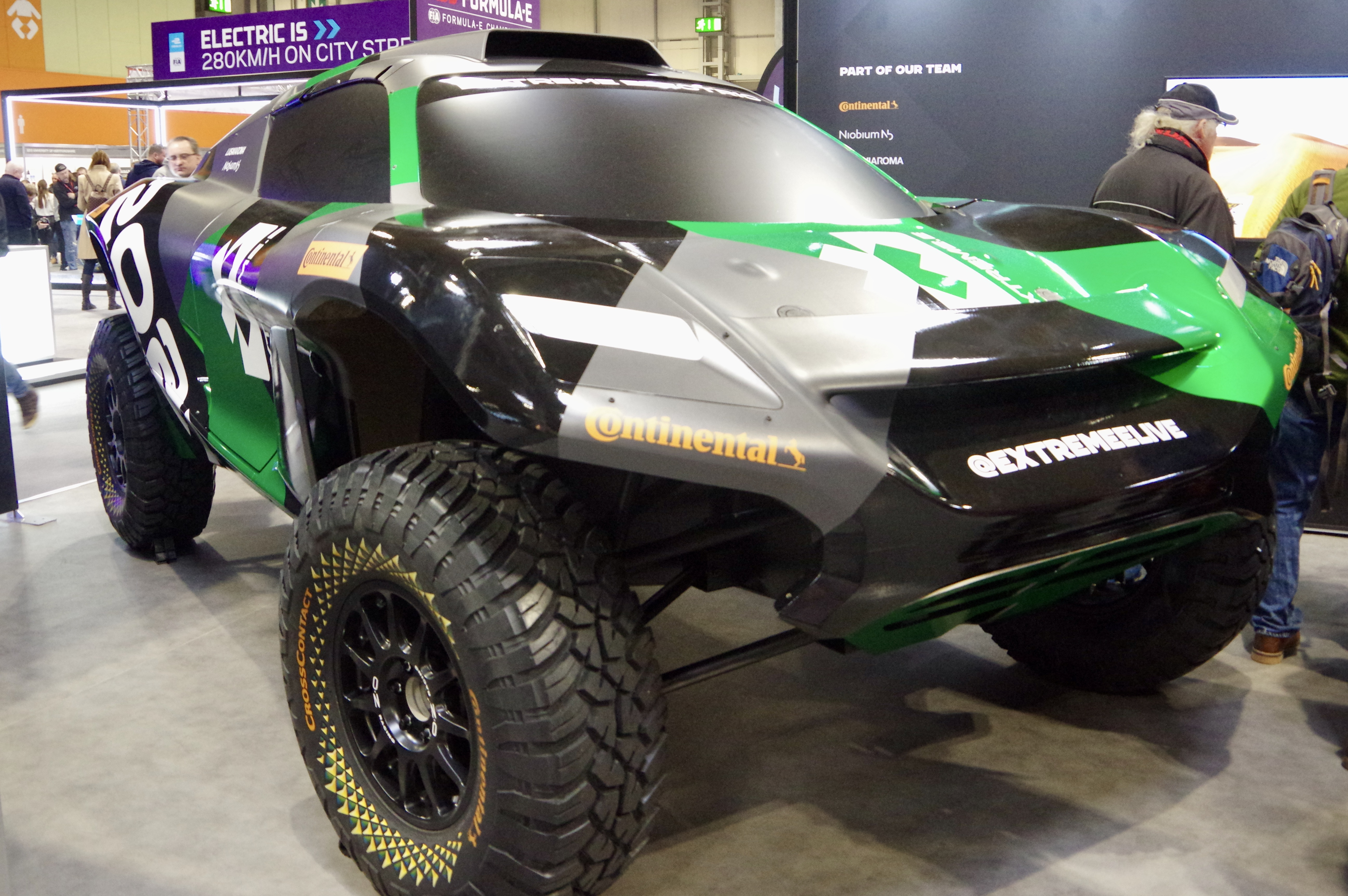
Extreme E car: the Odyssey 21

The following teams and drivers competed in the 2021 championship. All teams use one of the identical Odyssey 21 electric SUVs manufactured by Spark Racing Technology, with Chip Ganassi Racing running a modified bodywork. Each team consists of a male and a female driver, who share a car and have equal driving duties.

Team	No.	Drivers	Rounds
(United Kingdom) Veloce Racing	5	(United Kingdom) Jamie Chadwick	1–2, 5
(United Kingdom) Veloce Racing	5	(New Zealand) Emma Gilmour	3–4
(United Kingdom) Veloce Racing	5	(France) Stéphane Sarrazin	1–4
(United Kingdom) Veloce Racing	5	(South Africa) Lance Woolridge	5
(Germany) Rosberg X Racing	6	(Sweden) Johan Kristoffersson	All
(Germany) Rosberg X Racing	6	(Australia) Molly Taylor	All
(United Kingdom) JBXE	22	(United Kingdom) Jenson Button	1
(United Kingdom) JBXE	22	(Sweden) Kevin Hansen	2–5
(United Kingdom) JBXE	22	(Sweden) Mikaela Åhlin-Kottulinsky	All
(United States) Andretti United Extreme E	23	(United Kingdom) Catie Munnings	All
(United States) Andretti United Extreme E	23	(Sweden) Timmy Hansen	All
(Spain) Hispano Suiza Xite Energy Team (Spain) Xite Energy Racing (Note: Hispano Suiza Xite Energy Team rebranded as Xite Energy Racing ahead of round 2.)	42	(Spain) Christine GZ	All
(Spain) Hispano Suiza Xite Energy Team (Spain) Xite Energy Racing	42	(United Kingdom) Oliver Bennett	All
(United Kingdom) Team X44	44	(Spain) Cristina Gutiérrez	All
(United Kingdom) Team X44	44	(France) Sébastien Loeb	All
(Spain) Acciona | Sainz XE Team	55	(Spain) Carlos Sainz	All
(Spain) Acciona | Sainz XE Team	55	(Spain) Laia Sanz	All
(United States) Segi TV Chip Ganassi Racing	99	(United States) Kyle LeDuc	All
(United States) Segi TV Chip Ganassi Racing	99	(United States) Sara Price	All
(Germany) Abt Cupra XE	125	(Germany) Claudia Hürtgen	1–2 (Note: Claudia Hürtgen was entered for round 2 but was replaced after shakedown by Jutta Kleinschmidt for medical reasons.)
(Germany) Abt Cupra XE	125	(Germany) Jutta Kleinschmidt	2–5
(Germany) Abt Cupra XE	125	(Sweden) Mattias Ekström	All

Championship reserve drivers
Drivers	Rounds
(Germany) Jutta Kleinschmidt	1–2
(Italy) Tamara Molinaro	3–5
(Germany) Timo Scheider	All

=== Mid-season changes ===
- JBXE team owner Jenson Button only drove the first round and then replaced himself with Kevin Hansen.
- Claudia Hürtgen fell ill after the Ocean X-Prix shakedown and had to be replaced by championship reserve driver Jutta Kleinschmidt. Later it was announced that Kleinschmidt would take over the Abt Cupra seat for the remainder of the season.
- Jamie Chadwick missed rounds 3 and 4 because of W Series commitments and was replaced by Veloce reserve driver Emma Gilmour.
- Stéphane Sarrazin parted ways with Veloce prior to the final round of the season. He was replaced by the team's male reserve driver, Lance Woolridge.

== Results and standings ==
=== X-Prix ===
Round	Event	Qualifying 1	Qualifying 2	Qualifying Overall	Semi-Final 1	Semi-Final 2 (Note: Semi-Final 2 was known as the "Crazy Race" at the season-opening Desert X-Prix.)	Crazy Race (Note: The Crazy Race was known as the "Shootout" at the first two rounds of the season.)	Super Sector (Note: Commercially known as the "Continental Traction Challenge" at rounds 4 and 5.)	Final	Report
1	(Saudi Arabia) Desert X-Prix	(Germany) Rosberg X Racing	(United Kingdom) Team X44	(United Kingdom) Team X44	(Germany) Rosberg X Racing	(United States) Andretti United XE	(Germany) Abt Cupra XE	not awarded	(Germany) Rosberg X Racing	Report
2	(Senegal) Ocean X-Prix	(United Kingdom) Team X44	(United Kingdom) Team X44	(United Kingdom) Team X44	(Germany) Rosberg X Racing	(United Kingdom) JBXE	(United States) Chip Ganassi Racing	(United States) Chip Ganassi Racing	(Germany) Rosberg X Racing	Report
3	(Greenland) Arctic X-Prix	(United Kingdom) Team X44	(Germany) Rosberg X Racing	(United Kingdom) Team X44	(United Kingdom) Team X44	(United States) Andretti United XE	(United Kingdom) JBXE	(United States) Andretti United XE	(United States) Andretti United XE	Report
4	(Italy) Island X-Prix	(United Kingdom) Team X44	(United Kingdom) Team X44	(United Kingdom) Team X44	(United States) Chip Ganassi Racing	(Germany) Rosberg X Racing	(United Kingdom) JBXE	(United Kingdom) Team X44	(Germany) Rosberg X Racing	Report
5	(United Kingdom) Jurassic X-Prix	(United Kingdom) Team X44	(United Kingdom) Team X44	(United Kingdom) Team X44	(United Kingdom) Team X44	(Germany) Rosberg X Racing	(United States) Andretti United XE	(United Kingdom) Team X44	(United Kingdom) Team X44	Report

Scoring system

Points are awarded to the top nine drivers based on aggregate qualifying standings, as well as the top nine finishers. From the second round on, an additional 5 points are given to the fastest team in the Super Sector over the whole weekend.

Position	1st	2nd	3rd	4th	5th	6th	7th	8th	9th	SS
Qualifying	12	11	10	9	8	7	6	5	4	5 (Note: Only for the teams' championship.)
Race day	25	19	18	15	12	10	8	6	4	5

Only the best four X-Prix results count towards the drivers' championship.

=== Drivers' Championship standings ===
Pos.	Driver	DES (Saudi Arabia)		OCE (Senegal)		ARC (Greenland)		ISL (Italy)		JUR (United Kingdom)		Points
Pos.	Driver	Q	R	Q	R	Q	R	Q	R	Q	R	Points
1	(Sweden) Johan Kristoffersson (Australia) Molly Taylor	3	1	2	1	3	5	2	1	2	4	133
2	(Spain) Cristina Gutiérrez (France) Sébastien Loeb	1	3	1	4	1	4	1*	5	1	1*	121
3	(United Kingdom) Catie Munnings (Sweden) Timmy Hansen	4	2	8	9	4*	1	6	6	7	3	103
4	(Sweden) Mikaela Åhlin-Kottulinsky	6	6	4	3	8	2	7	3	5	2	102
4	(Sweden) Kevin Hansen			4	3	8	2	7	3	5	2	102
5	(Spain) Carlos Sainz (Spain) Laia Sanz	2	4	9	8	6	3	4	7	3	5	90
6	(Sweden) Mattias Ekström	8	7	3	5	2	7	3	2	4	7	87
6	(Germany) Jutta Kleinschmidt			3	5	2	7	3	2	4	7	87
7	(United States) Sara Price	7	8	7*	7	7	9	5	4	8	8	60
7	(France) Stéphane Sarrazin	9	WD	5	2	5	6	8	8			60
8	(United States) Kyle LeDuc	7	8	7*	7	7	9	5	4	8	8	59 (Note: Chip Ganassi Racing and Kyle LeDuc received a 1 championship point penalty for causing a collision in the shoot-out race of the Desert X-Prix.)
9	(Spain) Christine GZ (United Kingdom) Oliver Bennett	5	5	6	6	9	8	9	9	9	9	55
10	(United Kingdom) Jamie Chadwick	9	WD	5	2					6	6	48
11	(New Zealand) Emma Gilmour					5	6	8	8			29
12	(United Kingdom) Jenson Button	6	6									17
12	(South Africa) Lance Woolridge									6	6	17
13	(Germany) Claudia Hürtgen	8	7	WD	WD							13
Pos.	Driver	DES (Saudi Arabia)		OCE (Senegal)		ARC (Greenland)		ISL (Italy)		JUR (United Kingdom)		Points

Key
Colour	Result
Gold	Winner
Silver	2nd place
Bronze	3rd place
Green	Other points position
Black	Disqualified (DSQ)
White	Did not start (DNS)
White	Withdrew (WD)
White	Race cancelled (C)

* – Fastest in Super Sector

=== Teams' Championship standings ===
Pos.	Team	DES (Saudi Arabia)		OCE (Senegal)		ARC (Greenland)		ISL (Italy)		JUR (United Kingdom)		Points
Pos.	Team	Q	R	Q	R	Q	R	Q	R	Q	R	Points
1	(Germany) Rosberg X Racing	3	1	2	1	3	5	2	1	2	4	155
2	(United Kingdom) Team X44	1	3	1	4	1	4	1*	5	1	1*	155
3	(United Kingdom) JBXE	6	6	4	3	8	2	7	3	5	2	119
4	(United States) Andretti United Extreme E	4	2	8	9	4*	1	6	6	7	3	117
5	(Germany) Abt Cupra XE	8	7	3	5	2	7	3	2	4	7	100
6	(Spain) Acciona | Sainz XE Team	2	4	9	8	6	3	4	7	3	5	100
7	(United Kingdom) Veloce Racing	9	WD	5	2	5	6	8	8	6	6	77
8	(United States) Segi TV Chip Ganassi Racing	7	8	7*	7	7	9	5	4	8	8	74
9	(Spain) Hispano Suiza Xite Energy Team (Spain) Xite Energy Racing	5	5	6	6	9	8	9	9	9	9	63
Pos.	Team	DES (Saudi Arabia)		OCE (Senegal)		ARC (Greenland)		ISL (Italy)		JUR (United Kingdom)		Points
