= 2021 Jurassic X-Prix =

Round 5 of 5 of the 2021 Extreme E Championship
← Previous race

Race details
- Date: 18–19 December 2021
- Location: Bovington Camp, Dorset, United Kingdom
- Course: Clay, sand, gravel and mud
- Course length: 3.8 km (2.4 miles)
- Distance: 3 laps, 11.4 km (7.1 miles)

Pole position
Drivers	(France) Sébastien Loeb; (Spain) Cristina Gutiérrez	Team X44

Podium
First	(Spain) Cristina Gutiérrez; (France) Sébastien Loeb	Team X44
Second	(Sweden) Mikaela Åhlin-Kottulinsky; (Sweden) Kevin Hansen	JBXE
Third	(United Kingdom) Catie Munnings; (Sweden) Timmy Hansen	Andretti United XE

The 2021 Jurassic X-Prix was an Extreme E off-road race that was held on 18 and 19 December 2021 at Bovington Camp, in Dorset, England. It was the fifth and last round of the electric off-road racing car series' inaugural season. A significant rule adjustment was introduced for the event to accommodate the short nature of the circuit, each session now consisting of three laps, with the starting driver, who in the final would be the female driver, taking the first two.

The final was won by Cristina Gutiérrez and Sébastien Loeb for Team X44, ahead of JBXE and Andretti United Extreme E. Rosberg X Racing's Johan Kristoffersson and Molly Taylor came fourth to seal both the drivers' and the teams' championship.

== Classification ==
=== Qualifying ===
Pos.	No.	Team	Drivers	Q1			Q2			Combined	Points
Pos.	No.	Team	Drivers	Laps	Time	CP	Laps	Time	CP	Combined	Points
1	44	(United Kingdom) Team X44	(France) Sébastien Loeb (Spain) Cristina Gutiérrez	3	9:19.985	9	3	9:14.793	9	18	12
2	6	(Germany) Rosberg X Racing	(Sweden) Johan Kristoffersson (Australia) Molly Taylor	3	9:21.886	8	3	9:23.338	6	14	11
3	55	(Spain) Acciona | Sainz XE Team	(Spain) Carlos Sainz (Spain) Laia Sanz	3	9:22.742	7	3	9:22.621	7	14	10
4	125	(Germany) Abt Cupra XE	(Sweden) Mattias Ekström (Germany) Jutta Kleinschmidt	3	9:24.113	6	3	9:34.366	4	10	9
5	22	(United Kingdom) JBXE	(Sweden) Kevin Hansen (Sweden) Mikaela Åhlin-Kottulinsky	3	9:40.667	2	3	9:18.905	8	10	8
6	5	(United Kingdom) Veloce Racing	(South Africa) Lance Woolridge (United Kingdom) Jamie Chadwick	3	9:30.380	5	3	9:26.744	5	10	7
7	23	(United States) Andretti United Extreme E	(Sweden) Timmy Hansen (United Kingdom) Catie Munnings	3	9:32.103	4	3	9:37.956	2	6	6
8	99	(United States) Segi TV Chip Ganassi Racing	(United States) Kyle LeDuc (United States) Sara Price	3	9:35.166	3	3	9:51.431	1	4	5
9	42	(Spain) Xite Energy Racing	(United Kingdom) Oliver Bennett (Spain) Christine GZ	3	10:03.000	1	3	9:36.257	3	4	4

Key
Colour	Advance to
Black	Semi-Final 1
Silver	Semi-Final 2
Bronze	Crazy Race
Gold	Final

Notes:

- Tie-breakers were determined by Super Sector times.

=== Semi-final 1 ===
Pos.	No.	Team	Drivers	Laps	Time	Points
1	44	(United Kingdom) Team X44	(France) Sébastien Loeb (Spain) Cristina Gutiérrez	3	9:23.480	5^{1}
2	22	(United Kingdom) JBXE	(Sweden) Kevin Hansen (Sweden) Mikaela Åhlin-Kottulinsky	3	+0.404	
3	5	(United Kingdom) Veloce Racing	(South Africa) Lance Woolridge (United Kingdom) Jamie Chadwick	3	+4.950	10

Notes:

- ^1 – Team awarded 5 additional points for being fastest in the Super Sector.

=== Semi-final 2 ===
Pos.	No.	Team	Drivers	Laps	Time	Points
1	6	(Germany) Rosberg X Racing	(Sweden) Johan Kristoffersson (Australia) Molly Taylor	3	9:24.588	
2	55	(Spain) Acciona | Sainz XE Team	(Spain) Carlos Sainz (Spain) Laia Sanz	3	+6.249	
3	125	(Germany) Abt Cupra XE	(Sweden) Mattias Ekström (Germany) Jutta Kleinschmidt	3	+2:17.648	8

=== Crazy Race ===
Pos.	No.	Team	Drivers	Laps	Time	Points
1	23	(United States) Andretti United Extreme E	(Sweden) Timmy Hansen (United Kingdom) Catie Munnings	3	9:12.855	
2	99	(United States) Segi TV Chip Ganassi Racing	(United States) Kyle LeDuc (United States) Sara Price	3	+0.461	6
3	42	(Spain) Xite Energy Racing	(United Kingdom) Oliver Bennett (Spain) Christine GZ	3	+1:33.016	4

=== Final ===
Pos.	No.	Team	Drivers	Laps	Time	Points
1	44	(United Kingdom) Team X44	(Spain) Cristina Gutiérrez (France) Sébastien Loeb	3	9:20.609	25
2	22	(United Kingdom) JBXE	(Sweden) Mikaela Åhlin-Kottulinsky (Sweden) Kevin Hansen	3	+3.613	19
3	23	(United States) Andretti United Extreme E	(United Kingdom) Catie Munnings (Sweden) Timmy Hansen	3	+14.735	18
4	6	(Germany) Rosberg X Racing	(Australia) Molly Taylor (Sweden) Johan Kristoffersson	3	+15.798	15
5	55	(Spain) Acciona | Sainz XE Team	(Spain) Laia Sanz (Spain) Carlos Sainz	3	+31.101	12

Previous race: 2021 Island X-Prix	Extreme E Championship; 2021 season	Next race: 2022 Desert X-Prix
Previous race: N/A	Jurassic X-Prix	Next race: N/A
