= 2021 Island X-Prix =

Round 4 of 5 of the 2021 Extreme E Championship
← Previous race	Next race →

Race details
- Date: 23–24 October 2021
- Official name: 2021 Enel X Island X-Prix
- Location: Capo Teulada, Sardinia, Italy
- Course: Dry earth, ruts
- Course length: 7.0 km (4.3 miles)
- Distance: 2 laps, 14.1 km (8.7 miles)

Pole position
Drivers	(Spain) Cristina Gutiérrez; (France) Sébastien Loeb	Team X44

Podium
First	(Australia) Molly Taylor; (Sweden) Johan Kristoffersson	Rosberg X Racing
Second	(Germany) Jutta Kleinschmidt; (Sweden) Mattias Ekström	Abt Cupra XE
Third	(Sweden) Mikaela Åhlin-Kottulinsky; (Sweden) Kevin Hansen	JBXE

The 2021 Island X-Prix (formally the 2021 Enel X Island X-Prix) was an Extreme E off-road race that was held on 23 and 24 October 2021 at Capo Teulada, in the Sulcis-Iglesiente region of the Italian island of Sardinia. It was the fourth round of the electric off-road racing car series' inaugural season. The final was won by championship leaders Molly Taylor and Johan Kristoffersson for the Rosberg X Racing team, ahead of Abt Cupra XE and JBXE.

== Classification ==
=== Qualifying ===
Pos.	No.	Team	Drivers	Q1			Q2			Combined	Points
Pos.	No.	Team	Drivers	Laps	Time	CP	Laps	Time	CP	Combined	Points
1	44	(United Kingdom) Team X44	(Spain) Cristina Gutiérrez (France) Sébastien Loeb	2	11:05.105	9	2	10:45.401	9	18	12+5^{1}
2	6	(Germany) Rosberg X Racing	(Sweden) Johan Kristoffersson (Australia) Molly Taylor	2	11:37.557	4	2	11:03.771	7	11	11
3	125	(Germany) Abt Cupra XE	(Sweden) Mattias Ekström (Germany) Jutta Kleinschmidt	2	11:24.796	6	2	11:32.565	5	11	10
4	55	(Spain) Acciona | Sainz XE Team	(Spain) Carlos Sainz (Spain) Laia Sanz	2	11:17.388	8	2	13:17.948	2	10	9
5	99	(United States) Segi TV Chip Ganassi Racing	(United States) Sara Price (United States) Kyle LeDuc	0	No time	1	2	11:02.608	8	9	8
6	23	(United States) Andretti United Extreme E	(Sweden) Timmy Hansen (United Kingdom) Catie Munnings	2	12:23.897	3	2	11:14.124	6	9	7
7	22	(United Kingdom) JBXE	(Sweden) Kevin Hansen (Sweden) Mikaela Åhlin-Kottulinsky	2	11:28.014	5	2	11:34.160	4	9	6
8	5	(United Kingdom) Veloce Racing	(New Zealand) Emma Gilmour (France) Stéphane Sarrazin	2	11:23.176	7	0	No time	1	8	5
9	42	(Spain) Xite Energy Racing	(United Kingdom) Oliver Bennett (Spain) Christine GZ	1	8:34.030	2	2	11:43.636	3	5	4

Key
Colour	Advance to
Black	Semi-Final 1
Silver	Semi-Final 2
Bronze	Crazy Race
Gold	Final

Notes:

- Tie-breakers were determined by Super Sector times.
- ^1 – Team awarded 5 additional points for being fastest in the Super Sector.

=== Semi-final 1 ===
Pos.	No.	Team	Drivers	Laps	Time	Points
1	99	(United States) Segi TV Chip Ganassi Racing	(United States) Sara Price (United States) Kyle LeDuc	2	12:30.912	
2	44	(United Kingdom) Team X44	(Spain) Cristina Gutiérrez (France) Sébastien Loeb	0	+2 laps	
3	23	(United States) Andretti United Extreme E	(Sweden) Timmy Hansen (United Kingdom) Catie Munnings	0	+2 laps^{1}	10

Notes:

- ^1 – Andretti United Extreme E originally got further in the lap than Team X44, but were classified last as a penalty for causing a collision.

=== Semi-final 2 ===
Pos.	No.	Team	Drivers	Laps	Time	Points
1	6	(Germany) Rosberg X Racing	(Sweden) Johan Kristoffersson (Australia) Molly Taylor	2	11:25.861	
2	125	(Germany) Abt Cupra XE	(Sweden) Mattias Ekström (Germany) Jutta Kleinschmidt	2	+1:24.922	
3	55	(Spain) Acciona | Sainz XE Team	(Spain) Carlos Sainz (Spain) Laia Sanz	2	+7:40.705	8

=== Crazy Race ===
Pos.	No.	Team	Drivers	Laps	Time	Points
1	22	(United Kingdom) JBXE	(Sweden) Kevin Hansen (Sweden) Mikaela Åhlin-Kottulinsky	2	11:15.077	
2	5	(United Kingdom) Veloce Racing	(New Zealand) Emma Gilmour (France) Stéphane Sarrazin	1	+1 lap	6
3	42	(Spain) Xite Energy Racing	(United Kingdom) Oliver Bennett (Spain) Christine GZ	1	+1 lap	4

=== Final ===
Pos.	No.	Team	Drivers	Laps	Time	Points
1	6	(Germany) Rosberg X Racing	(Australia) Molly Taylor (Sweden) Johan Kristoffersson	2	11:42.963	25
2	125	(Germany) Abt Cupra XE	(Germany) Jutta Kleinschmidt (Sweden) Mattias Ekström	2	+24.588	19
3	22	(United Kingdom) JBXE	(Sweden) Mikaela Åhlin-Kottulinsky (Sweden) Kevin Hansen	1	+1 lap	18
4	99	(United States) Segi TV Chip Ganassi Racing	(United States) Kyle LeDuc (United States) Sara Price	1	+1 lap	15
5	44	(United Kingdom) Team X44	(France) Sébastien Loeb (Spain) Cristina Gutiérrez	0	+2 laps	12

Previous race: 2021 Arctic X-Prix	Extreme E Championship; 2021 season	Next race: 2021 Jurassic X-Prix
Previous race: N/A	Island X-Prix	Next race: 2022 Island X-Prix
