= 2022 Energy X-Prix =

Round 5 of 5 of the 2022 Extreme E Championship
← Previous race

Race details
- Date: 26–27 November 2022
- Official name: 2022 Uruguay Natural Energy X-Prix
- Location: Punta del Este, Uruguay
- Course: Mud, grass
- Course length: 3.0 km (1.9 miles)
- Distance: 4 laps, 12.0 km (7.5 miles)

Pole position
Drivers	(Australia) Molly Taylor; (Sweden) Kevin Hansen	Veloce Racing

Podium
First	(Qatar) Nasser Al-Attiyah; (Sweden) Klara Andersson	Abt Cupra XE
Second	(United States) Tanner Foust; (New Zealand) Emma Gilmour	McLaren XE
Third	(France) Sébastien Loeb; (Spain) Cristina Gutiérrez	X44

The 2022 Energy X-Prix (formally the 2022 Uruguay Natural Energy X-Prix) was an Extreme E off-road race that was held on 26 and 27 November 2022 near José Ignacio, Maldonado Department, Uruguay, about 25 km east of the seaside city of Punta del Este. It was the fifth and final round of the electric off-road racing car series' second season, and also marked the first running of the event.

Abt Cupra XE won its first X-Prix with Nasser Al-Attiyah and Klara Andersson. They were followed by Neom McLaren Extreme E, who visited the podium for the first time, and X44 Vida Carbon Racing's Sébastien Loeb and Cristina Gutiérrez. This third place, combined with the 5 extra Super Sector points, granted Lewis Hamilton's team both the drivers' and the teams' titles ahead of reigning champions Rosberg X Racing.

== Classification ==
=== Qualifying ===
Qualifying 2 draw
Heat 1	(Spain) Acciona | Sainz XE	(United States) Chip Ganassi Racing	(United States) Andretti United XE	(Spain) Xite Energy Racing	(United Kingdom) X44
Heat 2	(United Kingdom) Veloce Racing	(Germany) Abt Cupra XE	(United Kingdom) McLaren XE	(Germany) Rosberg X Racing	(United Kingdom) JBXE

Pos.	No.	Team	Drivers	Q1			Q2			Combined
Pos.	No.	Team	Drivers	Laps	Time	CP	Laps	Time	CP	Combined
1	5	(United Kingdom) Veloce Racing	(Australia) Molly Taylor (Sweden) Kevin Hansen	4	10:14.683	9	4	10:28.323	10	19
2	55	(Spain) Acciona | Sainz XE Team	(Spain) Laia Sanz (Spain) Carlos Sainz	4	10:14.120	10	4	10:25.983	8	18
3	23	(United States) Genesys Andretti United Extreme E	(United Kingdom) Catie Munnings (Sweden) Timmy Hansen	4	10:16.726	6	4	10:22.885	10	16
4	99	(United States) GMC Hummer EV Chip Ganassi Racing	(United States) Sara Price (United States) RJ Anderson	4	10:15.242	8	4	10:36.085	6	14
5	125	(Germany) Abt Cupra XE	(Sweden) Klara Andersson (Qatar) Nasser Al-Attiyah	4	10:15.461	7	4	10:55.479	4	11
6	58	(United Kingdom) Neom McLaren Extreme E	(New Zealand) Emma Gilmour (United States) Tanner Foust	4	10:24.767	5	4	10:53.153	6	11
7	22	(United Kingdom) JBXE	(Norway) Hedda Hosås (Jamaica) Fraser McConnell	1	3:28.787	0	4	10:30.806	8	8
8	42	(Spain) Xite Energy Racing	(Italy) Tamara Molinaro (Argentina) Ezequiel Pérez Companc	4	10:30.154	4	4	11:24.543	2	6
9	44	(United Kingdom) X44 Vida Carbon Racing	(Spain) Cristina Gutiérrez (France) Sébastien Loeb	1	3:37.624	0	4	11:00.424	4	4
10	6	(Germany) Rosberg X Racing	(Sweden) Mikaela Åhlin-Kottulinsky (Sweden) Johan Kristoffersson	1	3:56.187	0	2	4:29.739	0	0

Key
Colour	Advance to
Black	Semi-Final 1
Silver	Semi-Final 2
Bronze	Crazy Race
Gold	Final

Notes:

- Tie-breakers were determined by Super Sector times.

=== Semi-final 1 ===
Pos.	No.	Team	Drivers	Laps	Time	Points
1	5	(United Kingdom) Veloce Racing	(Australia) Molly Taylor (Sweden) Kevin Hansen	4	10:36.604	
2	125	(Germany) Abt Cupra XE	(Sweden) Klara Andersson (Qatar) Nasser Al-Attiyah	4	+6.916	
3	99	(United States) GMC Hummer EV Chip Ganassi Racing	(United States) Sara Price (United States) RJ Anderson	4	+22.093^{1}	8

Notes:

- ^1 – GMC Hummer EV Chip Ganassi Racing originally finished second, but received a pair of 10-second time penalties for taking down two waypoint flags.

=== Semi-final 2 ===
Pos.	No.	Team	Drivers	Laps	Time	Points
1	23	(United States) Genesys Andretti United Extreme E	(United Kingdom) Catie Munnings (Sweden) Timmy Hansen	4	10:20.294	
2	58	(United Kingdom) Neom McLaren Extreme E	(New Zealand) Emma Gilmour (United States) Tanner Foust	4	+8.073	
3	55	(Spain) Acciona | Sainz XE Team	(Spain) Laia Sanz (Spain) Carlos Sainz	4	+16.117	6

=== Crazy Race ===
Pos.	No.	Team	Drivers	Laps	Time	Points
1	44	(United Kingdom) X44 Vida Carbon Racing	(Spain) Cristina Gutiérrez (France) Sébastien Loeb	4	10:44.858	
2	42	(Spain) Xite Energy Racing	(Italy) Tamara Molinaro (Argentina) Ezequiel Pérez Companc	4	+37.784	4
3	22	(United Kingdom) JBXE	(Norway) Hedda Hosås (Jamaica) Fraser McConnell	0	No time	2
DSQ	6	(Germany) Rosberg X Racing	(Sweden) Mikaela Åhlin-Kottulinsky (Sweden) Johan Kristoffersson	2	Disqualified^{1}	1

Notes:

- ^1 – Rosberg X Racing had completed enough of the distance to be classified third, but was later disqualified for having too many mechanics present inside its switch bay area during the driver switch. The team still got the point for overall tenth place from the event.

=== Final ===
Pos.	No.	Team	Drivers	Laps	Time	Points
1	125	(Germany) Abt Cupra XE	(Qatar) Nasser Al-Attiyah (Sweden) Klara Andersson	4	10:26.537	25
2	58	(United Kingdom) Neom McLaren Extreme E	(United States) Tanner Foust (New Zealand) Emma Gilmour	4	+3.427	18
3	44	(United Kingdom) X44 Vida Carbon Racing	(France) Sébastien Loeb (Spain) Cristina Gutiérrez	4	+10.467^{2}	15+5^{1}
4	23	(United States) Genesys Andretti United Extreme E	(Sweden) Timmy Hansen (United Kingdom) Catie Munnings	4	+11.029^{2}	12
5	5	(United Kingdom) Veloce Racing	(Sweden) Kevin Hansen (Australia) Molly Taylor	4	+15.094	10

Notes:

- ^1 – Team awarded 5 additional points for being fastest in the Super Sector.
- ^2 – Genesys Andretti United Extreme E finished third on the road, but received a 7-second time penalty for speeding in the switch zone. X44 Vida Carbon Racing, who originally finished fourth, inherited the position. X44 later received a 5-second time penalty themselves for causing a collision, but it was not enough to relegate them back to fourth and they kept third place, which granted them the title.

Previous race: 2022 Copper X-Prix	Extreme E Championship; 2022 season	Next race: 2023 Desert X-Prix
Previous race: N/A	Energy X-Prix	Next race: N/A
