= Lia Block =

American racing driver (born 2006)

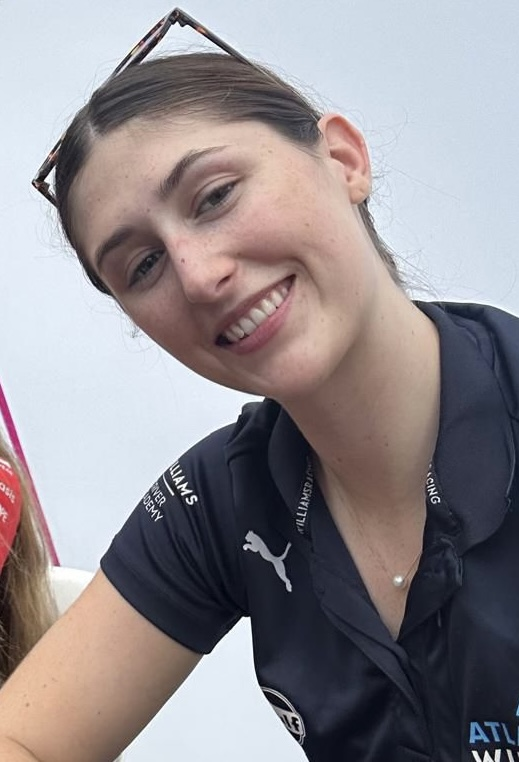
- Block at the 2025 Singapore Grand Prix
- Nationality: (United States) American
- Born: October 1, 2006 (age 20) Rancho Santa Fe, California, U.S.
- Relatives: Ken Block (father)

American Rally Association career
- Former teams: Subaru Motorsports USA, Block House Racing, Hoonigan Racing Division
- Starts: 15
- Wins: 5
- Podiums: 8
- Best finish: 2nd in 2026

Previous series
- 2024–25; 2025; 2025; 2024; 2024; 2024; 2023–24; 2023; 2021–2023: F1 Academy; ARA East; Eurocup-4 Spanish Winter; Italian F4; F4 Spanish; Formula Winter Series; Nitrocross NEXT; Extreme E

Lia Block (born October 1, 2006) is an American racing driver who currently competes in the American Rally Association for Block House Racing driving a Hyundai i20 N Rally2. She previously competed in the American Rally Association, she has also raced for Carl Cox Motorsport in Extreme E, and for OMSE and Dreyer & Reinbold Racing in Nitrocross and for Block House Racing in the ARA East Championship. She later competed in F1 Academy for ART Grand Prix as part of the Williams Driver Academy.

She is the first woman to have an overall victory at a round of American Rally Association National Championship.

== Career ==
=== American Rally Association ===
Block made her American Rally Association debut in the 2021 Oregon Trail Rally. She then competed full-time for the 2022 season.

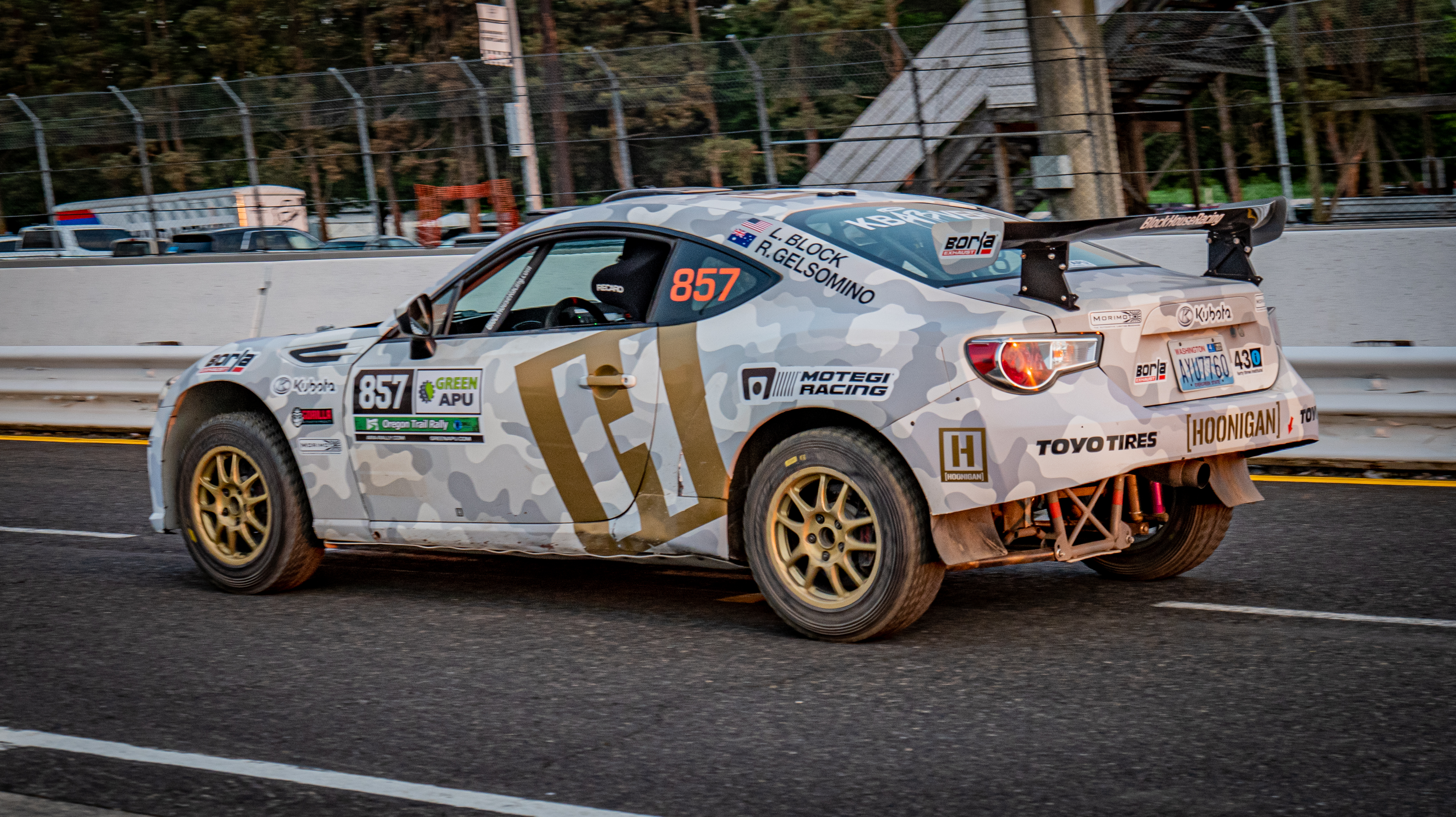
Block driving a modified Subaru BRZ at the 2023 Oregon Trail Rally

Block competed in the 2023 American Rally Association season and won the Open Two-Wheel-Drive (O2WD) class. She became the youngest champion in the series' history, at 16 years old.

On October 1, 2024, it was announced that Block would be competing in the 2024 Lake Superior Performance Rally, taking over Brandon Semenuk's Subaru WRX. She retired from the race after crashing on the second day of the two day rally, with co-driver Keaton Williams.

In August 2025, Block won the Limited Four-Wheel-Drive (L4WD) class at the Boone Forest Rally with Rhianon Gelsomino, driving the Ford Fiesta Rally3 car. The duo finished third place overall.

At the 2026 Ojibwe Forests Rally she won, becoming the first woman to win overall in an event of the American Rally Association.

=== Extreme E ===
On July 3, 2023, Carl Cox Motorsport announced that they had signed Block for the remainder of the 2023 Extreme E season, partnering Timo Scheider and replacing Christine GZ.

=== Nitrocross ===
On June 14, 2023, it was announced that Block would join OSME for the 2023–24 Nitrocross Championship. After achieving a fourth-place finish in the first round, she won her second race on the road, but was later disqualified due to an unsafe rejoin in the early stages of the race. Block drove Travis Pastrana's Group E car in the seventh race of the championship, becoming the first female driver to compete in the category.

In 2024, Block returned to Group E for the first round of the championship, competing for Dreyer & Reinbold Racing, where she achieved two 6th-place finishes.

=== F1 Academy ===
==== 2024 ====
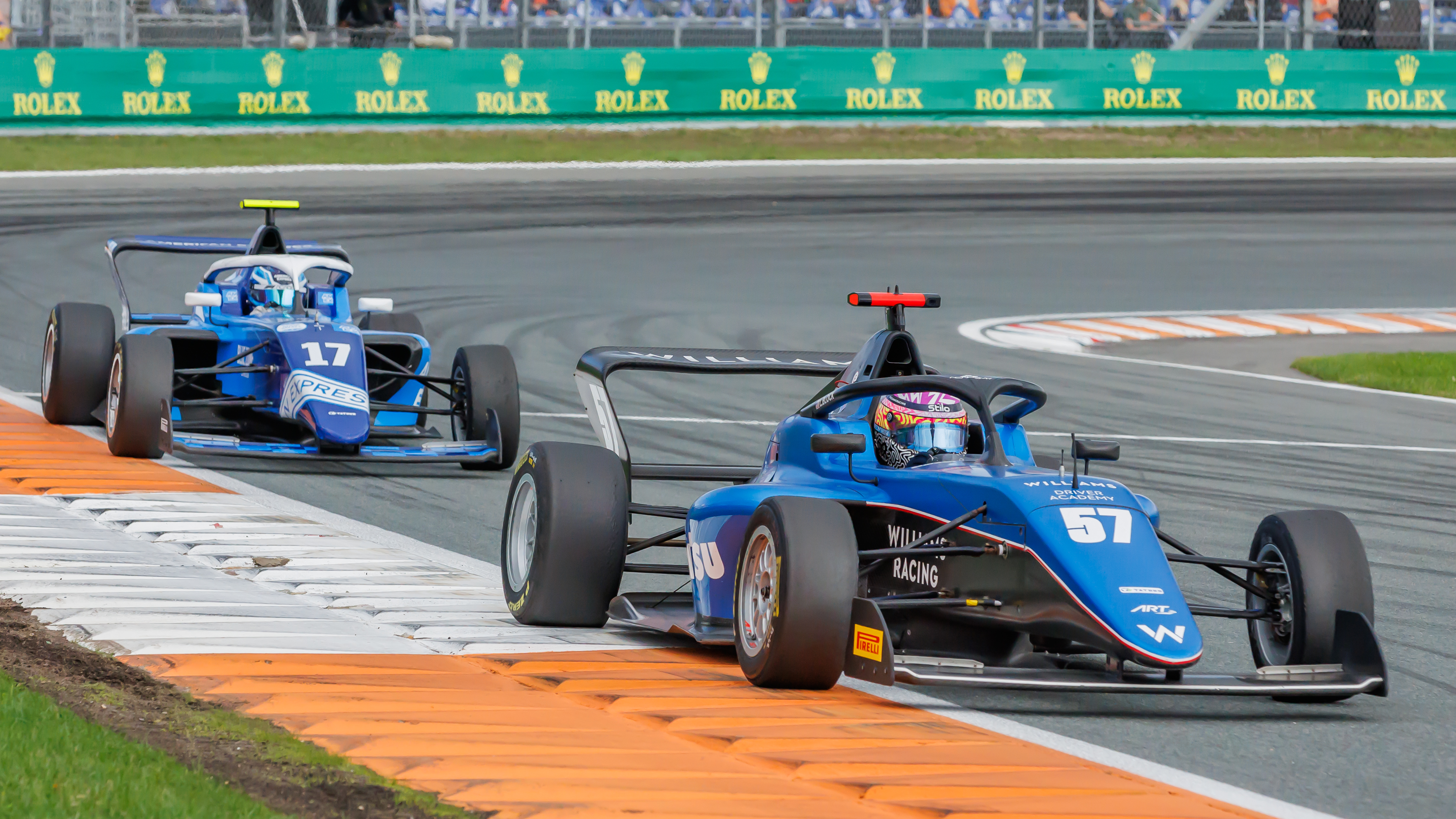
Block leading Jess Edgar in 2024 at an F1 Academy race in Zandvoort

In November 2023, Block was announced as a driver for ART Grand Prix for the 2024 season of F1 Academy in her first full season of open-wheel racing. She was supported by Williams Racing and joined the Williams Driver Academy. She was partnered with McLaren developmental driver Bianca Bustamante and Ferrari Driver Academy driver Aurelia Nobels running for Puma.

Block debuted in Jeddah, qualifying in seventh for Race 1 and in 13th for Race 2. She spun and hit the wall on the penultimate lap of Race 1 and was classified in 16th place. In Race 2, she made unavoidable contact with Lola Lovinfosse and was forced to pit. She crossed the line in ninth position but was classified in 11th after post-race penalties. Round 2 in Miami was a home race for Block. She spun in Race 1 and ended in 15th. Race 2 was a closer fight, as she was classified 11th but moved up to tenth after post-race penalties, thus scoring her first point in F1 Academy. The next round in Barcelona saw her continue her point scoring streak, converting two top-ten starting positions into a tenth place and sixth place, respectively.

==== 2025 ====
Block was retained by Williams Racing and ART Grand Prix for the 2025 season.

Block earned her first podium during Race 1 at Zandvoort, qualifying in sixth in the reverse grid race. She finished the race in second place, behind Nina Gademan and ahead of Maya Weug.

Block's maiden win took place during Race 1 at Singapore, where she finished ahead of Maya Weug and Chloe Chambers. She started the race from reverse-grid pole and defended her position successfully after two safety car restarts. This was also her first win in single-seater racing. At the end of the season, Williams announced that Block departed the Williams Driver Academy to return to rallying.

== Personal life ==
Block is the daughter of the American rally driver and Gymkhana racer and founder of Hoonigan Ken Block, who died in a snowmobile accident on January 2, 2023. Block also is the youngest person to obtain a NHRA Drag racing license, as she obtained it in 2021 at the age of fourteen.

== Racing record ==
=== Career summary ===
Season	Series	Team	Races	Wins	Poles	F/Laps	Podiums	Points	Position
2021	American Rally Association - 2WD	Hoonigan Racing Division	1	0	N/A	N/A	0	0	NC
2022	American Rally Association - 2WD	Hoonigan Racing Division	6	0	N/A	N/A	2	49	5th
2022–23	Nitrocross Championship - SXS	Hoonigan Racing Division	4	0	N/A	N/A	0	140	8th
2023	Baja 1000 - Pro Stock UTV	Block House Racing	1	1	N/A	N/A	1	N/A	**1st**
2023	American Rally Association - O2WD	Block House Racing	5	4	N/A	N/A	5	114	**1st**
2023	American Rally Association - O4WD	Block House Racing	1	0	N/A	N/A	0	0	NC
2023	Extreme E Championship	Carl Cox Motorsport	6	0	N/A	N/A	0	27	14th
2023–24	Nitrocross Championship - NEXT	OMSE	7	0	N/A	N/A	3	327	6th
2023–24	Nitrocross Championship - Group E	Vermont SportsCar	1	0	N/A	N/A	0	32	19th
2024	Formula Winter Series	GRS Team	8	0	0	0	0	0	45th
2024	F4 Spanish Championship	GRS Team	6	0	0	0	0	0	36th
2024	F1 Academy	ART Grand Prix	14	0	0	0	0	44	8th
2024	Italian F4 Championship	ART Grand Prix	3	0	0	0	0	0	49th
2024–25	Nitrocross Championship - Group E	Dreyer & Reinbold Racing Dodge	4	0	N/A	N/A	0	114	8th
2025	Eurocup-4 Spanish Winter Championship	ART Grand Prix	6	0	0	0	0	0	32nd
2025	F1 Academy	ART Grand Prix	14	1	0	0	2	37	9th
2026	American Rally Association - L4WD	Block House Racing	1	0	N/A	N/A	0	0	NC
2026	American Rally Association - RC2	Block House Racing	7	1	N/A	N/A	6	116	**2nd**

* Season still in progress.

=== Complete American Rally Association results ===
(key) (small number denotes the finishing position)

Year	Team	Car	Class	1	2	3	4	5	6	7	8	9	Pos.	Points
2021	Hoonigan Racing Division	Ford Fiesta R2	O2WD	Sno*Drift	Rally in the 100 Acre Wood	Olympus Rally	Southern Ohio Forest Rally	New England Forest Rally	Ojibwe Forests Rally	Susquehannock Trail Rally	LSPR	Oregon Trail Rally; Ret	NC	0
2022	Hoonigan Racing Division	Ford Fiesta R2T	O2WD	Sno*Drift	Rally in the 100 Acre Wood; 5	Olympus Rally; 8	Oregon Trail Rally; 7	Southern Ohio Forest Rally; 3	New England Forest Rally	Ojibwe Forests Rally	Susquehannock Trail Rally; 3	LSPR; Ret	5th	49
2023	Block House Racing	Subaru BRZ (ZC6)	O2WD	Sno*Drift	Rally in the 100 Acre Wood; 2	Olympus Rally; 1	Oregon Trail Rally; 1	Southern Ohio Forest Rally; 1	New England Forest Rally; 1	Ojibwe Forests Rally	LSPR		1st	114
2023	Block House Racing	Ford Escort RS Cosworth	O4WD	Sno*Drift	Rally in the 100 Acre Wood	Olympus Rally	Oregon Trail Rally	Southern Ohio Forest Rally	New England Forest Rally	Ojibwe Forests Rally	LSPR; Ret		NC	0
2024	Subaru Motorsports USA	Subaru WRX (VB)	O4WD	Sno*Drift	Rally in the 100 Acre Wood	Olympus Rally	Oregon Trail Rally	Southern Ohio Forest Rally	Ojibwe Forests Rally	Overmountain Rally Tennessee	LSPR; Ret		NC	0
2026	Block House Racing	Ford Fiesta Rally3	L4WD	Sno*Drift; Ret	Rally in the 100 Acre Wood	Olympus Rally	Southern Ohio Forest Rally	Rally Colorado	Ojibwe Forests Rally	Overmountain Rally Tennessee	LSPR		NC	0
2026	Block House Racing	Hyundai i20 N Rally2	RC2	Sno*Drift	Rally in the 100 Acre Wood; 3	Olympus Rally; 3	Southern Ohio Forest Rally; 2	Rally Colorado; 2	Ojibwe Forests Rally; 1	Overmountain Rally Tennessee; 4	LSPR; 2		2nd	116

=== ARA East ===
Year	Team	Car	Class	1	2	3	4	5	Pos.	Points
2025	Block House Racing	Ford Fiesta Rally3	L4WD	Sno*Drift Super Regional	Southern Ohio Forest Regional Rally	Susquehannock Trail Performance Rally	Boone Forest Rally; 1	Overmountain Rally Tennessee	18th	12

=== Complete Extreme E results ===
(key)

Year	Team	Car	1	2	3	4	5	6	7	8	9	10	Pos.	Points
2023	Carl Cox Motorsport	Spark ODYSSEY 21	DES; 1	DES; 2	HYD; 1	HYD; 2	ISL1; 1; 9	ISL1; 2; 10	ISL2; 1; 5	ISL2; 2; 8	COP; 1; 6	COP; 2; 9	14th	27

=== Complete Nitrocross results ===
==== Complete Nitrocross NEXT results ====
(key)

Year	Team	Car	1	2	3	4	5	6	7	8	9	10	Pos.	Points
2023–24	OMSE	Olsbergs MSE SuperCar Lites	MID1; 4	MID2; DSQ	UTH1; DSQ	UTH2; 4	WHP1; 3	WHP2; 2	HLN1; 2	HLN2	LAS1	LAS2	6th	327

==== Complete Nitrocross Group E results ====
(key)

Year	Team	Car	1	2	3	4	5	6	7	8	9	10	Pos.	Points
2023–24	Vermont SportsCar	Olsbergs MSE FC1-X	MID1	UMC1	UMC2	WHP1	WHP2	HLN1	HLN2; 8	STA	LAS1	LAS2	19th	32
2024-25	Dreyer & Reinbold Racing Dodge	Dodge Hornet R/T FC1-X	RIC1; 6	RIC2; 6	UMC1; 9	UMC2; 5	FMP1	FMP2	MIA1	MIA2	LAS1	LAS2	8th*	114*

=== Complete Formula Winter Series results ===
(key) (Races in bold indicate pole position; races in italics indicate fastest lap)

Year	Team	1	2	3	4	5	6	7	8	9	10	11	12	DC	Points
2024	GRS Team	JER; 1; 29	JER; 2; 30	JER; 3; 35	CRT; 1; 28	CRT; 2; 25	CRT; 3 WD	ARA; 1; 30	ARA; 2; 26†	ARA; 3; 29†	CAT; 1	CAT; 2	CAT; 3	45th	0

=== Complete F1 Academy results ===
(key) (Races in bold indicate pole position; races in italics indicate fastest lap)

Year	Team	1	2	3	4	5	6	7	8	9	10	11	12	13	14	15	DC	Points
2024	ART Grand Prix	JED; 1; 16†	JED; 2; 11	MIA; 1; 15	MIA; 2; 10	CAT; 1; 10	CAT; 2; 6	ZAN; 1; 9	ZAN; 2; 15	SIN; 1; 4	SIN; 2; 4	LSL; 1; 6	LSL; 2 C	YMC; 1; 12	YMC; 2; 12	YMC; 3; 15	8th	44
2025	ART Grand Prix	SHA; 1; 9	SHA; 2; 9	JED; 1; 12	JED; 2; 14	MIA; 1; 10	MIA; 2 C	MTL; 1; 4	MTL; 2; 8	MTL; 3 Ret	ZAN; 1; 2	ZAN; 2; 12	SIN; 1; 1	SIN; 2; 17	LVG; 1; 5	LVG; 2; 11	9th	37

† Did not finish, but classified

=== Complete F4 Spanish Championship results ===
(key) (Races in bold indicate pole position; races in italics indicate fastest lap)

Year	Team	1	2	3	4	5	6	7	8	9	10	11	12	13	14	15	16	17	18	19	20	21	DC	Points
2024	GRS Team	JAR; 1	JAR; 2	JAR; 3	POR; 1; 28	POR; 2; 25	POR; 3; 27	LEC; 1; 17	LEC; 2; 23	LEC; 3; 27	ARA; 1	ARA; 2	ARA; 3	CRT; 1	CRT; 2	CRT; 3	JER; 1	JER; 2	JER; 3	CAT; 1	CAT; 2	CAT; 3	36th	0

=== Complete Italian F4 Championship results ===
(key) (Races in bold indicate pole position) (Races in italics indicate fastest lap)

Year	Team	1	2	3	4	5	6	7	8	9	10	11	12	13	14	15	16	17	18	19	20	21	DC	Points
2024	ART Grand Prix	MIS; 1	MIS; 2	MIS; 3	IMO; 1	IMO; 2	IMO; 3	VLL; 1	VLL; 2	VLL; 3	MUG; 1	MUG; 2	MUG; 3	LEC; 1	LEC; 2	LEC; 3	CAT; 1	CAT; 2	CAT; 3	MNZ; 1; 30	MNZ; 2; 23	MNZ; 3 Ret	49th	0

=== Complete Eurocup-4 Spanish Winter Championship results ===
(key) (Races in bold indicate pole position) (Races in italics indicate fastest lap)

Year	Team	1	2	3	4	5	6	7	8	9	DC	Points
2025	ART Grand Prix	JER; 1; 24	JER; 2; 17	JER; 3 Ret	POR; 1; 21	POR; 2; 17	POR; 3; 22	NAV; 1	NAV; 2	NAV; 3	33rd	0
