= 2023–24 Nitrocross Championship =

Rallycross racing competition

2023–24 Nitrocross season

Season
- Races: 10
- Start date: June 16, 2023
- End date: March 2, 2024

Awards
- Drivers' champion: (Sweden) Robin Larsson

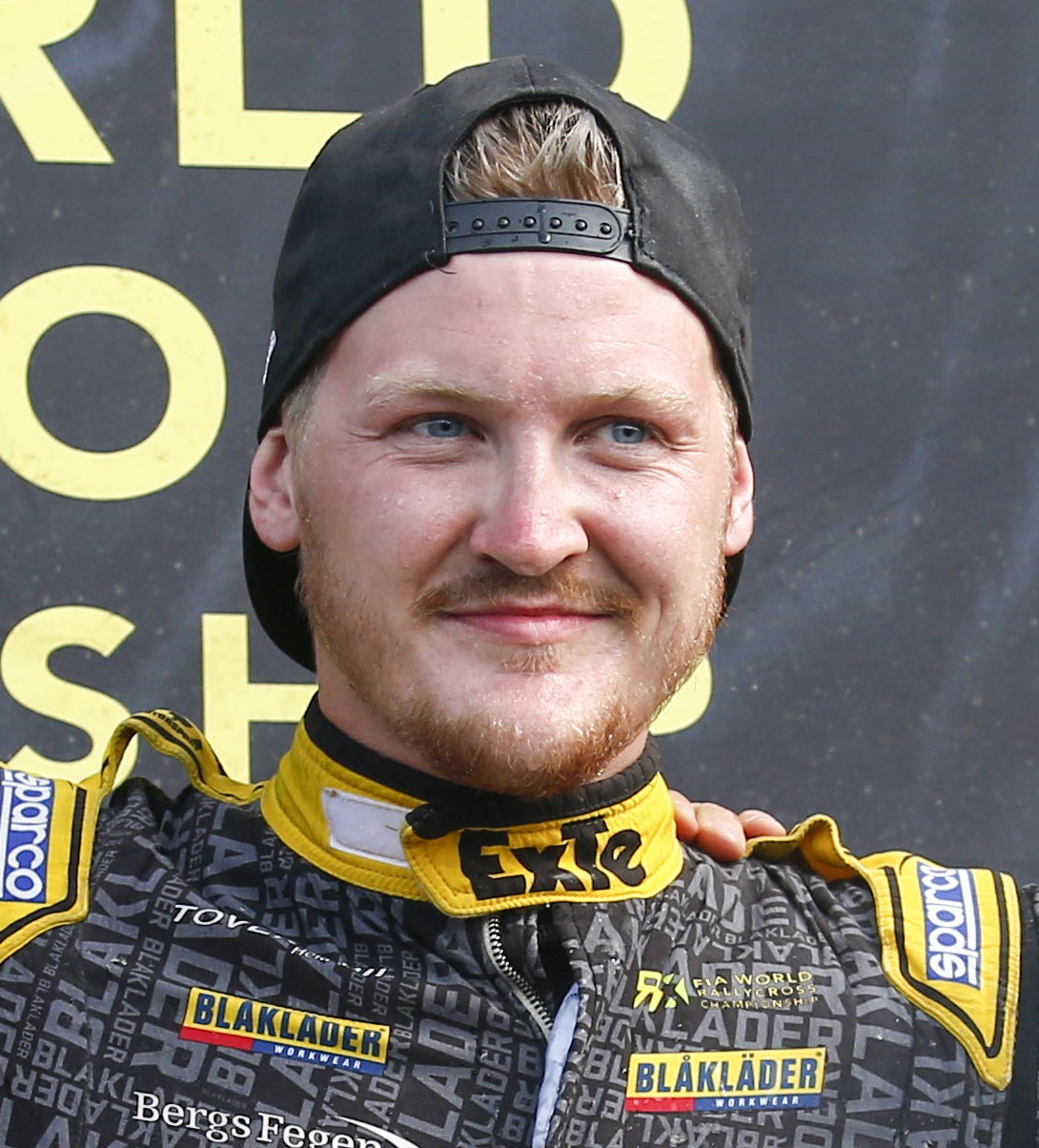
Robin Larsson enters the season as the defending champion.

The 2023–24 Nitrocross Championship is the third season of Nitrocross (formerly Nitro Rallycross) competition.

Robin Larsson won the championship for the second year in a row.

== Schedule ==
The full schedule was revealed on May 15, 2023. After expanding its calendar on a global scale in the 2022–23 season, the series scaled back its schedule to just ten rounds in North America.

Rnd	Event	Date	Venue	Class	Winner	Team	Report
1	NC of Oklahoma	June 16–17, 2023	MidAmerica Outdoors, Jay	Group E	(Jamaica) Fraser McConnell	(United States) Dreyer & Reinbold Racing	Report
1	NC of Oklahoma	June 16–17, 2023	MidAmerica Outdoors, Jay	NEXT (Day 1)	(United States) Lane Vacala	(United States) BAK 40 Motorsport	Report
1	NC of Oklahoma	June 16–17, 2023	MidAmerica Outdoors, Jay	NEXT (Day 2)	(United States) Lane Vacala	(United States) BAK 40 Motorsport	Report
1	NC of Oklahoma	June 16–17, 2023	MidAmerica Outdoors, Jay	SxS (Day 1)	(United States) Kainan Baker	N/A	Report
1	NC of Oklahoma	June 16–17, 2023	MidAmerica Outdoors, Jay	SxS (Day 2)	(United States) Kainan Baker	N/A	Report
1	NC of Oklahoma	June 16–17, 2023	MidAmerica Outdoors, Jay	BajaBugs (Day 1)	(United States) Blake Wilkey	N/A	Report
1	NC of Oklahoma	June 16–17, 2023	MidAmerica Outdoors, Jay	BajaBugs (Day 2)	(United States) Ryan Rodriguez	N/A	Report
2–3	NC of Utah	August 18–19, 2023	Utah Motorsports Campus, Grantsville	Group E (Day 1)	(United States) Travis Pastrana	(United States) Vermont SportsCar	Report
2–3	NC of Utah	August 18–19, 2023	Utah Motorsports Campus, Grantsville	Group E (Day 2)	(Sweden) Robin Larsson	(United States) Dreyer & Reinbold Racing JC	Report
2–3	NC of Utah	August 18–19, 2023	Utah Motorsports Campus, Grantsville	NEXT (Day 1)	(United States) Lane Vacala	(United States) BAK 40 Motorsport	Report
2–3	NC of Utah	August 18–19, 2023	Utah Motorsports Campus, Grantsville	NEXT (Day 2)	(Sweden) Casper Jansson	(Sweden) OMSE	Report
2–3	NC of Utah	August 18–19, 2023	Utah Motorsports Campus, Grantsville	SxS (Day 1)	(United States) Kainan Baker	N/A	Report
2–3	NC of Utah	August 18–19, 2023	Utah Motorsports Campus, Grantsville	SxS (Day 2)	(United States) Tyler Remmereid	N/A	Report
2–3	NC of Utah	August 18–19, 2023	Utah Motorsports Campus, Grantsville	BajaBugs (Day 1)	(United States) Blake Wilkey	N/A	Report
2–3	NC of Utah	August 18–19, 2023	Utah Motorsports Campus, Grantsville	BajaBugs (Day 2)	(United States) Ryan Rodriguez	N/A	Report
4–5	NC of Arizona	November 10–11, 2023	Wild Horse Pass Motorsports Park, Chandler	Group E (Day 1)	(Jamaica) Fraser McConnell	(United States) Dreyer & Reinbold Racing	Report
4–5	NC of Arizona	November 10–11, 2023	Wild Horse Pass Motorsports Park, Chandler	Group E (Day 2)	(Sweden) Robin Larsson	(United States) Dreyer & Reinbold Racing JC	Report
4–5	NC of Arizona	November 10–11, 2023	Wild Horse Pass Motorsports Park, Chandler	NEXT (Day 1)	(Sweden) Casper Jansson	(Sweden) OMSE	Report
4–5	NC of Arizona	November 10–11, 2023	Wild Horse Pass Motorsports Park, Chandler	NEXT (Day 2)	(Sweden) Casper Jansson	(Sweden) OMSE	Report
4–5	NC of Arizona	November 10–11, 2023	Wild Horse Pass Motorsports Park, Chandler	SxS (Day 1)	(United States) Kainan Baker	N/A	Report
4–5	NC of Arizona	November 10–11, 2023	Wild Horse Pass Motorsports Park, Chandler	SxS (Day 2)	(United States) Travis Pastrana	N/A	Report
4–5	NC of Arizona	November 10–11, 2023	Wild Horse Pass Motorsports Park, Chandler	BajaBugs (Day 1)	(United States) Ryan Rodriguez	N/A	Report
4–5	NC of Arizona	November 10–11, 2023	Wild Horse Pass Motorsports Park, Chandler	BajaBugs (Day 2)	(United States) Ryan Rodriguez	N/A	Report
6–7	NC of California	December 9–10, 2023	Glen Helen Raceway, San Bernardino	Group E	(Sweden) Oliver Eriksson	(Sweden) Olsbergs MSE	Report
6–7	NC of California	December 9–10, 2023	Glen Helen Raceway, San Bernardino	Group E (Day 2)	(Sweden) Robin Larsson	(United States) Dreyer & Reinbold Racing JC	Report
6–7	NC of California	December 9–10, 2023	Glen Helen Raceway, San Bernardino	NEXT (Day 1)	(Sweden) Casper Jansson	(Sweden) OMSE	Report
6–7	NC of California	December 9–10, 2023	Glen Helen Raceway, San Bernardino	NEXT (Day 2)	(Sweden) Casper Jansson	(Sweden) OMSE	Report
6–7	NC of California	December 9–10, 2023	Glen Helen Raceway, San Bernardino	SxS (Day 1)	(United States) Travis Pastrana	N/A	Report
6–7	NC of California	December 9–10, 2023	Glen Helen Raceway, San Bernardino	SxS (Day 2)	(United States) Kainan Baker	N/A	Report
6–7	NC of California	December 9–10, 2023	Glen Helen Raceway, San Bernardino	BajaBugs (Day 1)	(United States) Ryan Rodriguez	N/A	Report
6–7	NC of California	December 9–10, 2023	Glen Helen Raceway, San Bernardino	BajaBugs (Day 2)	(United States) Blake Wilkey	N/A	Report
NC	NC of Alberta	February 4, 2024*	GMC Stadium, Calgary	N/A	N/A	N/A	
8-9	(Nevada) NC Series Finale	March 1–2, 2024	Nitrodome at Planet Hollywood, Las Vegas	Group E Group E (Day 2)	(Jamaica) Fraser McConnell (Sweden) Robin Larsson	(United States) Dreyer & Reinbold Racing (United States) Dreyer & Reinbold Racing JC	Report
8-9	(Nevada) NC Series Finale	March 1–2, 2024	Nitrodome at Planet Hollywood, Las Vegas	NEXT			Report
8-9	(Nevada) NC Series Finale	March 1–2, 2024	Nitrodome at Planet Hollywood, Las Vegas	SxS			Report

- The Calgary round was scheduled for February 2–3, however due to weather all on track activity was postponed until February 4, and on the day of was made a non-points exhibition.

== Drivers ==
=== Group E ===
Manufacturer	Car	Team	No.	Driver	Rounds
OMSE
OMSE	FC1-X	(United States) Dreyer & Reinbold Racing	15	(Sweden) Timmy Hansen	8–9
OMSE	FC1-X	(United States) Dreyer & Reinbold Racing	24	(United States) Conor Daly	1–3
OMSE	FC1-X	(United States) Dreyer & Reinbold Racing	35	(Jamaica) Fraser McConnell	All
OMSE	FC1-X	(United States) Dreyer & Reinbold Racing JC	4	(Sweden) Robin Larsson	All
OMSE	FC1-X	(United States) Dreyer & Reinbold Racing JC	13	(Norway) Andreas Bakkerud	All
OMSE	FC1-X	(United States) Dreyer & Reinbold Racing JC	38	(United States) Brian Deegan	4–7
OMSE	FC1-X	(Sweden) Olsbergs MSE	16	(Sweden) Oliver Eriksson	All
OMSE	FC1-X	(Sweden) Olsbergs MSE	23	(Sweden) Kevin Eriksson	All
OMSE	FC1-X	(Sweden) Olsbergs MSE	36	(Sweden) Casper Jansson	4–5
OMSE	FC1-X	(Sweden) Olsbergs MSE	71	(Mexico) Benito Guerra	1–3
OMSE	FC1-X	(United States) Vermont SportsCar	21	(United States) Conner Martell	All
OMSE	FC1-X	(United States) Vermont SportsCar	57	(United States) Lia Block	7
OMSE	FC1-X	(United States) Vermont SportsCar	199	(United States) Travis Pastrana	1–6, 8–9
OMSE	FC1-X	(Belgium) VMV Racing	31	(Belgium) Viktor Vranckx	6–9
OMSE	FC1-X	(Belgium) VMV Racing	96	(Belgium) Guillaume de Ridder	8–9
OMSE	FC1-X	(United Kingdom) Xite Energy Racing	7	(United Kingdom) Patrick O'Donovan	8–9
OMSE	FC1-X	(United Kingdom) Xite Energy Racing	34	(United States) Tanner Foust	2–3
OMSE	FC1-X	(United Kingdom) Xite Energy Racing	42	(United Kingdom) Oliver Bennett	1–3, 8–9
OMSE	FC1-X	(United Kingdom) Xite Energy Racing	62	(United Kingdom) Kris Meeke	1

=== NEXT ===
Manufacturer	Car	Team	No.	Driver	Rounds
OMSE	Olsbergs MSE SuperCar Lites	(United States) BAK 40 Motorsport	44	(United States) Jimmy Henderson	All
OMSE	Olsbergs MSE SuperCar Lites	(United States) BAK 40 Motorsport	55	(United States) Lane Vacala	All
OMSE	Olsbergs MSE SuperCar Lites	(United States) BAK 40 Motorsport	99	(United States) Eric Gordon	All
OMSE	Olsbergs MSE SuperCar Lites	(United States) Ellysium Racing	11	(United States) Ellis Spiezia	9–10
OMSE	Olsbergs MSE SuperCar Lites	(United States) Green Apu	17	(United States) Patrick Gruszka	3–10
OMSE	Olsbergs MSE SuperCar Lites	(Sweden) OMSE	36	(Sweden) Casper Jansson	All
OMSE	Olsbergs MSE SuperCar Lites	(Sweden) OMSE	57	(United States) Lia Block	1–7
OMSE	Olsbergs MSE SuperCar Lites	(Sweden) OMSE	133	(Sweden) Elias Svensson	9–10
OMSE	Olsbergs MSE SuperCar Lites	(Belgium) PPD Motorsport	14	(Belgium) David Sterckx	7–10
OMSE	Olsbergs MSE SuperCar Lites	(United States) Scully Racing	191	(United States) Alastair Scully	7–10
OMSE	Olsbergs MSE SuperCar Lites	(United States) Team Baccco	21	(United States) Kainan Baker	8

=== SxS ===
Manufacturer	Car	No.	Driver	Rounds
Can-Am	Maverick X3	4	(United States) Donald Cerrone	3–8
Can-Am	Maverick X3	5	(United States) Kira Block	4–6, 8
Can-Am	Maverick X3	9	(United States) Michael Leach	5–8
Can-Am	Maverick X3	11	(United States) Jim York	1–2
Can-Am	Maverick X3	12	(United States) Amanda Sorensen	3, 5–6
Can-Am	Maverick X3	13	(Brazil) Letícia Bufoni	1–8
Can-Am	Maverick X3	21	(United States) Kainan Baker	1–8
Can-Am	Maverick X3	28	(United States) Gray Leadbetter	1–8
Can-Am	Maverick X3	38	(United States) Brian Deegan	7–8
Can-Am	Maverick X3	67	(United States) Ben Maier	1–2, 5–6
Can-Am	Maverick X3	82	(United States) Mika Block	3, 5–8
Can-Am	Maverick X3	88	(United Kingdom) Tom Williams	1–2
Can-Am	Maverick X3	113	(United States) Braden Sorensen	4
Can-Am	Maverick X3	143	(United States) Tyler Remmereid	1–8
Can-Am	Maverick X3	177	(United States) Cleetus McFarland	3–4
Can-Am	Maverick X3	188	(United States) Terry Madden	1–4
Can-Am	Maverick X3	199	(United States) Travis Pastrana	4–8

=== BajaBugs ===
Manufacturer	Car	No.	Driver	Rounds
Volkswagen	Beetle	401	(United States) Chad Mayo	1
Volkswagen	Beetle	1107	(United States) Eric Rhinehart	1
Volkswagen	Beetle	1133	(United States) Will Harris	1
Volkswagen	Beetle	1142	(United States) Greg Shapiro	1
Volkswagen	Beetle	1145	(United States) Donald Cerrone	1
Volkswagen	Beetle	1153	(United States) Kyle Zirkus	1
Volkswagen	Beetle	1157	(United States) Blake Wilkey	1
Volkswagen	Beetle	1191	(United States) Ryan Rodriguez	1

== Standings ==
=== Group E ===
Rank	Driver	(Oklahoma) MID	(Utah) UMC1	(Utah) UMC2	(Arizona) WHP1	(Arizona) WHP2	(California) HLN1	(California) HLN2	(Nevada) LAS1	(Nevada) LAS2	Pts
1	(Sweden) Robin Larsson	2	6	1	2	1	3	1	2	1	582
2	(Jamaica) Fraser McConnell	1^{1}	11	4	1	2	5	2	1	4	504
3	(Sweden) Kevin Eriksson	3^{2}	2	2	4	3	4	3	7	10	481
4	(Norway) Andreas Bakkerud	7^{1}	3	5	5	6	6	9	6	8	409
5	(Sweden) Oliver Eriksson	10	8	8	6	7	1	6	8	7	397
6	(United States) Travis Pastrana	5	1	10	3	5	7		5	11	370
7	(United States) Conner Martell	4	7	6	8	9	2	5	9	5	363
8	(United States) Brian Deegan				9	8	8	7			155
9	(United Kingdom) Oliver Bennett	9	10	7					11	12	142
10	(Sweden) Timmy Hansen								3	2	139
11	(Belgium) Viktor Vranckx						9	4	10	6	129
12	(Belgium) Guillaume De Ridder								4	3	115
13	(United States) Conor Daly	8	5	11							97
14	(Mexico) Benito Guerra	11	4	9	WD						88
15	(United States) Tanner Foust		9	3							84
16	(Sweden) Casper Jansson				7	4					80
17	(United Kingdom) Kris Meeke	6									44
18	(United Kingdom) Patrick O'Donovan								12	9	42
19	(United States) Lia Block							8			32

Key
Color	Result
Gold	Winner
Silver	2nd place
Bronze	3rd place
Green	Other finishing position
Blue	Non Points finish
Purple	Did not finish
Pink	Did not qualify (DNQ)
Black	Disqualified (DSQ)
Brown	Withdrew (WD)
White	Did not start (DNS)
White	Race cancelled (C)

Notes:
^{1 2 3 4} – Battle Wins

=== Group E Team's Championship ===
Pos.	Team	No.	(Oklahoma) MID	(Utah) UMC1	(Utah) UMC2	(Arizona) WHP1	(Arizona) WHP2	(California) HLN1	(California) HLN2	(Nevada) LAS1	(Nevada) LAS2	Points
1	(United States) Dreyer & Reinbold Racing JC	4	2	6	1	2	1	3	1	2	1	1076
1	(United States) Dreyer & Reinbold Racing JC	13	7^{1}	3	5	5	6	6	9	6	8	1076
2	(Sweden) Olsbergs MSE	16	10	8	8	6	7	1	6	8	7	925
2	(Sweden) Olsbergs MSE	23	3^{2}	2	2	4	3	4	3	7	10	925
3	(United States) Dreyer & Reinbold Racing	35	1^{1}	11	4	1	2	5	2	1	4	919
3	(United States) Dreyer & Reinbold Racing	15								3	2	919
3	(United States) Dreyer & Reinbold Racing	24	8	5	11							919
3	(United States) Dreyer & Reinbold Racing	38				9	8	8	7			919
4	(United States) Vermont SportsCar	21	4	7	6	8	9	2	5	9	5	800
4	(United States) Vermont SportsCar	57							8			800
4	(United States) Vermont SportsCar	199	5	1	10	3	5	7		5	11	800
5	(United Kingdom) Xite Energy Racing	7								12	9	317
5	(United Kingdom) Xite Energy Racing	34		9	3							317
5	(United Kingdom) Xite Energy Racing	42	9	10	7					11	12	317
5	(United Kingdom) Xite Energy Racing	62	6									317
6	(Belgium) VMV Racing	31						9	4	10	6	261
6	(Belgium) VMV Racing	96								4	3	261

=== NEXT ===
Rank	Driver	(Oklahoma) MID1	(Oklahoma) MID2	(Utah) UTH1	(Utah) UTH2	(Arizona) WHP1	(Arizona) WHP2	(California) HLN1	(California) HLN2	(Nevada) LAS1	(Nevada) LAS2	Pts
1	(Sweden) Casper Jansson	5	4	DSQ	1	1	1	1	1	1	1	566
2	(United States) Lane Vacala	1	1	1	6	2	5	4	3	2	3	540
3	(United States) Jimmy Henderson	3	3	2	2	5	3	5	2	5	7	508
4	(United States) Eric Gordon	2	2	4	5	4	6	7	5	8	5	413
5	(United States) Patrick Gruszka			3	3	6	4	3	6	6	8	352
6	(United States) Lia Block	4	DSQ	DSQ	4	3	2	2				327
7	(Belgium) David Sterckx							6	4	7	4	158
8	(Sweden) Elias Svensson									3	2	116
9	(United States) Alastair Scully							8	8	9	6	92
10	(United States) Ellis Spiezia									4	9	79
11	(United States) Kainan Baker								7			28

=== SxS ===
Rank	Driver	(Oklahoma) MID1	(Oklahoma) MID2	(Utah) UTH1	(Utah) UTH2	(Arizona) WHP1	(Arizona) WHP2	(California) HLN1	(California) HLN2	(Nevada) LAS1	(Nevada) LAS2	Pts
1	(United States) Kainan Baker	1	1	1	10	1	2	2	1	4	10	557
2	(United States) Tyler Remmereid	2	2	2	1	2	3	5	2	2	9	543
3	(United States) Gray Leadbetter	4	4	4	4	3	4	4	3	3	3	481
4	(United States) Travis Pastrana				2	11	1	1	6	1		301
5	(Brazil) Leticia Bufoni	6	6	5	8	7	9	9	DNS	11	8	234
6	(United States) Amanda Sorensen			3		5	6			8	4	202
7	(United States) Ben Maier	3	3			10	5					182
8	(United States) Donald Cerrone			6	7	8	11	7	8	12	10	172
9	(United States) Michael Leach					4	8	3	5			152
10	(United States) Mika Block			9		6	7	6	7			152
11	(United States) Terry Madden	5	5	7	5							137
12	(United States) Branden Sorensen				3					12	1	126
13	(United States) Banks Hovey									5	2	102
14	(United States) Kira Block				6	9	10		9			94
15	(United States) Brian Deegan							8	4			81
16	(United States) Zach Lumsden									7	7	69
17	(United Kingdom) Tom Williams	8	7									69
18	(United States) Alyanna Baker									9	6	67
19	(United States) Cleetus McFarland			8	9							58
20	(Sweden) Adam Thomelius									6	11	49
21	(United States) Matt Crafton										5	41
22	(United States) Jim York	7	8									34
