= 2024–25 Nitrocross Championship =

Rallycross racing competition

2024–25 Nitrocross season

Season
- Races: 10
- Start date: September 7, 2024
- End date: March 2, 2025

Awards

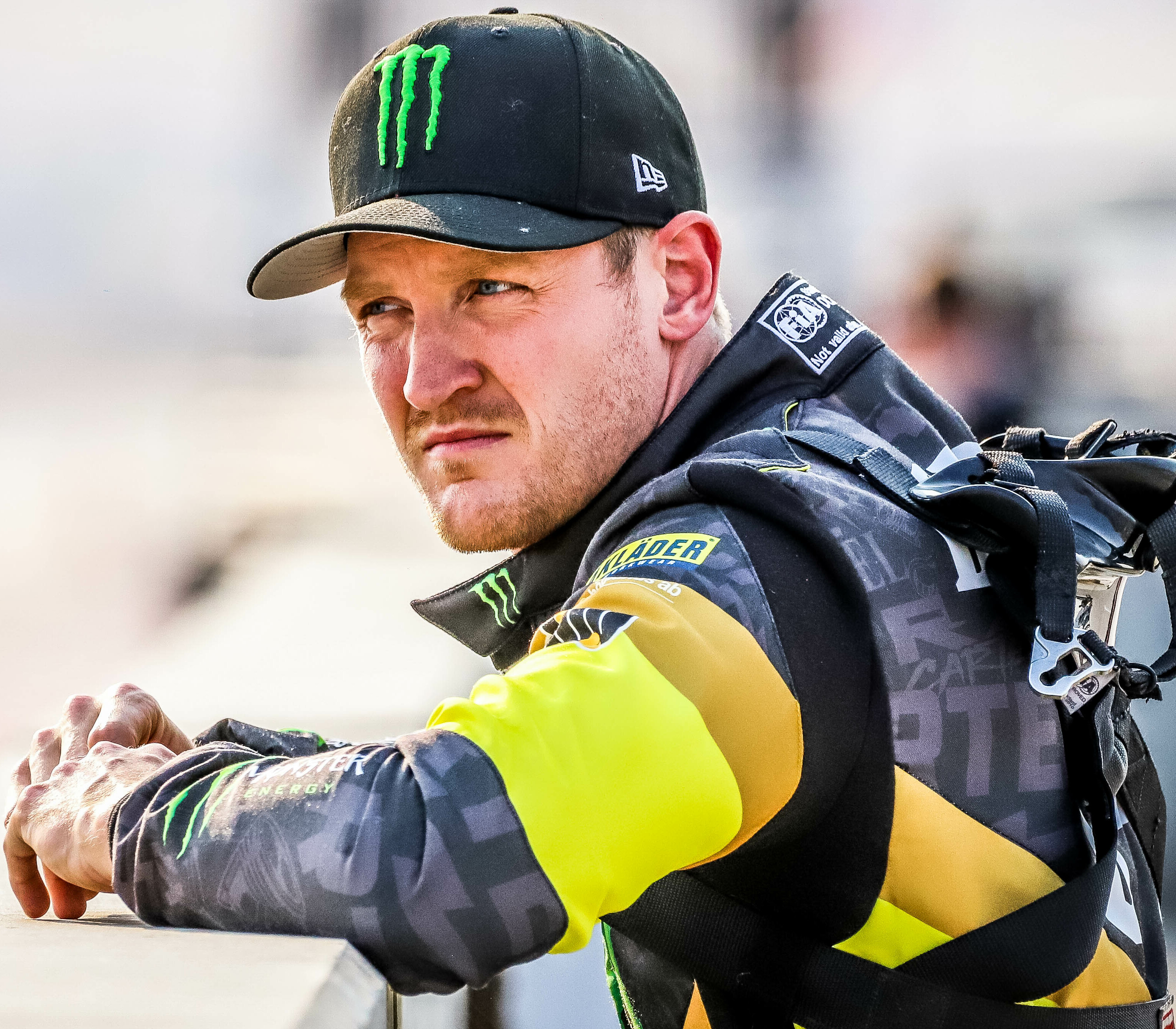
Robin Larsson enters the season as the defending champion.

The 2024–25 Nitrocross Championship is the fourth season of Nitrocross competition.

The Nitrocross NEXT category changed to NEXT EVO for the season. It was also announced that a new all-electric SIERRA Car support series would be added to the bill.

== Schedule ==
The full schedule was revealed on November 11, 2023, with a revised schedule released on February 29, 2024.

On October 16, 2024, Nitrocross announced that the rounds at Phoenix, Miami, and Las Vegas would not be continuing as scheduled, but that they "remain committed to exploring new opportunities for the future of Nitrocross and motorsports".

Rnd	Event	Date	Venue	Class	Winner	Team	Report
1–2	NC of Virginia	September 7–8, 2024	Richmond Raceway, Richmond	Group E (Day 1)	(Sweden) Robin Larsson	(United States) Dreyer & Reinbold Racing Dodge	Report
1–2	NC of Virginia	September 7–8, 2024	Richmond Raceway, Richmond	Group E (Day 2)	(Sweden) Oliver Eriksson	(Sweden) Olsbergs MSE	Report
1–2	NC of Virginia	September 7–8, 2024	Richmond Raceway, Richmond	NEXT (Day 1)	(United States) Mitchell DeJong	(United States) Bak40 Motorsports	Report
1–2	NC of Virginia	September 7–8, 2024	Richmond Raceway, Richmond	NEXT (Day 2)	(Finland) Tommi Hallman	(United States) SET Loenbro	Report
1–2	NC of Virginia	September 7–8, 2024	Richmond Raceway, Richmond	SxS (Day 1)	(United States) Cash LeCroy		Report
1–2	NC of Virginia	September 7–8, 2024	Richmond Raceway, Richmond	SxS (Day 2)	(United States) Kainan Baker		Report
1–2	NC of Virginia	September 7–8, 2024	Richmond Raceway, Richmond	BajaBugs (Day 1)	(United States) Donny Donovan		Report
1–2	NC of Virginia	September 7–8, 2024	Richmond Raceway, Richmond	BajaBugs (Day 2)	(United States) Blake Wilkey		Report
3–4	NC of Utah	October 5–6, 2024	Utah Motorsports Campus, Grantsville	Group E (Day 1)	(Norway) Andreas Bakkerud	(United States) Dreyer & Reinbold Racing Dodge	Report
3–4	NC of Utah	October 5–6, 2024	Utah Motorsports Campus, Grantsville	Group E (Day 2)	(Norway) Andreas Bakkerud	(United States) Dreyer & Reinbold Racing Dodge	Report
3–4	NC of Utah	October 5–6, 2024	Utah Motorsports Campus, Grantsville	NEXT (Day 1)	(Finland) Tommi Hallman	(United States) SET Loenbro	Report
3–4	NC of Utah	October 5–6, 2024	Utah Motorsports Campus, Grantsville	NEXT (Day 2)	(United States) Mitchell DeJong	(United States) Bak40 Motorsports	Report
3–4	NC of Utah	October 5–6, 2024	Utah Motorsports Campus, Grantsville	SxS (Day 1)	(United States) Travis Pastrana		Report
3–4	NC of Utah	October 5–6, 2024	Utah Motorsports Campus, Grantsville	SxS (Day 2)	(United States) Kainan Baker		Report
3–4	NC of Utah	October 5–6, 2024	Utah Motorsports Campus, Grantsville	BajaBugs (Day 1)	(United States) Greg Shapiro		Report
3–4	NC of Utah	October 5–6, 2024	Utah Motorsports Campus, Grantsville	BajaBugs (Day 2)	(Mexico) Oliver Flemate		Report
—N/a	NC of Arizona	November 15–16, 2024	Firebird Motorsports Park, Phoenix				
—N/a	NC of Florida	January 11–12, 2025	Miami Marine Stadium, Miami				
—N/a	(Nevada) NC Series Finale	March 1–2, 2025	Nitrodome at Planet Hollywood, Las Vegas				

== Drivers ==
=== Group E ===
Manufacturer	Car	Team	No.	Driver	Rounds
Dodge	Hornet R/T FC1-X	(United States) Dreyer & Reinbold Racing Dodge	4	(Sweden) Robin Larsson	1–4
Dodge	Hornet R/T FC1-X	(United States) Dreyer & Reinbold Racing Dodge	13	(Norway) Andreas Bakkerud	1–4
Dodge	Hornet R/T FC1-X	(United States) Dreyer & Reinbold Racing Dodge	35	(Jamaica) Fraser McConnell	1–4
Dodge	Hornet R/T FC1-X	(United States) Dreyer & Reinbold Racing Dodge	57	(United States) Lia Block	1–4
OMSE	FC1-X	(Sweden) Olsbergs MSE	16	(Sweden) Oliver Eriksson	1–4
OMSE	FC1-X	(Sweden) Olsbergs MSE	23	(Sweden) Kevin Eriksson	1–4
OMSE	FC1-X	(Sweden) Olsbergs MSE	34	(United States) Tanner Foust	1–4
OMSE	FC1-X	(United States) Vermont SportsCar	21	(United States) Conner Martell	1–4
OMSE	FC1-X	(Belgium) VMV Racing	31	(Belgium) Viktor Vranckx	1–4

=== NEXT EVO ===
Manufacturer	Car	Team	No.	Driver	Rounds
OMSE	Olsbergs MSE FC2	(Sweden) Team Faren	11	(United States) Ellis Spiezia	1–4
OMSE	Olsbergs MSE FC2	(United States) Green APU	14	(Belgium) David Sterckx	3–4
OMSE	Olsbergs MSE FC2	(United States) Green APU	17	(United States) Patrick Gruszka	1–4
OMSE	Olsbergs MSE FC2	(United States) Green APU	191	(United States) Alastair Scully	1–4
OMSE	Olsbergs MSE FC2	(United States) Bak40 Motorsports	21	(United States) Kainan Baker	1–2
OMSE	Olsbergs MSE FC2	(United States) Bak40 Motorsports	24	(United States) Mitchell DeJong	1–4
OMSE	Olsbergs MSE FC2	(United States) Bak40 Motorsports	55	(United States) Lane Vacala	1–4
OMSE	Olsbergs MSE FC2	(United States) Bak40 Motorsports	99	(United States) Eric Gordon	3–4
OMSE	Olsbergs MSE FC2	(Sweden) Team OMSE	36	(Sweden) Casper Jansson	1–4
OMSE	Olsbergs MSE FC2	(United States) SET Loenbro	9	(United States) Michael Leach	1–4
OMSE	Olsbergs MSE FC2	(United States) SET Loenbro	87	(Finland) Tommi Hallman	1–4

=== SxS ===
Manufacturer	Car	No.	Driver	Rounds
Can-Am	Maverick X3	15	(United States) Kira Block	4
Can-Am	Maverick X3	17	(United States) Kory Willis	1–4
Can-Am	Maverick X3	21	(United States) Kainan Baker	1–4
Can-Am	Maverick X3	22	(United States) Luke Roberts	3–4
Can-Am	Maverick X3	27	(United States) Cash LeCroy	1–4
Can-Am	Maverick X3	28	(United States) Gray Leadbetter	1–4
Can-Am	Maverick X3	30	(United States) Lucy Block	3
Can-Am	Maverick X3	31	(United States) Jacob Rosales	1–4
Can-Am	Maverick X3	37	(United States) Mia Chapman	1–4
Can-Am	Maverick X3	38	(United States) Hailie Deegan	3–4
Can-Am	Maverick X3	82	(United States) Mika Block	4
Can-Am	Maverick X3	93	(United States) Jacob Geisendorff	1–4
Can-Am	Maverick X3	129	Lyn-Z Pastrana	1
Can-Am	Maverick X3	138	(United States) Nate Wessel	1–2
Can-Am	Maverick X3	143	(United States) Tyler Remmereid	1–2
Can-Am	Maverick X3	169	(United States) Banks Hovey	2, 4
Can-Am	Maverick X3	188	(United States) Terry Madden	3
Can-Am	Maverick X3	199	(United States) Travis Pastrana	1–3

=== BajaBugs ===
Manufacturer	Car	No.	Driver	Rounds
Volkswagen	Beetle	214	(United States) Donald Cerrone	3–4
Volkswagen	Beetle	430	(United States) Lucy Block	1–3
Volkswagen	Beetle	430	(United States) Terry Madden	4
Volkswagen	Beetle	1101	(United States) Will Harris	1–2
Volkswagen	Beetle	1103	(United States) Tim Sletten	1–4
Volkswagen	Beetle	1105	(United States) Chris Isenhouer	2
Volkswagen	Beetle	1105	(United States) Nick Isenhouer	1, 3–4
Volkswagen	Beetle	1107	(United States) Donny Donovan	1–4
Volkswagen	Beetle	1122	(United States) Scotty Lasater	1–4
Volkswagen	Beetle	1140	(United States) Joe Terrana	3–4
Volkswagen	Beetle	1141	(United States) Jim York	1–4
Volkswagen	Beetle	1142	(United States) Greg Shapiro	1–4
Volkswagen	Beetle	1143	(United States) Avery Remmereid	1–2
Volkswagen	Beetle	1144	(Mexico) Oliver Flemate	3–4
Volkswagen	Beetle	1153	(United States) Kyle Zirkus	1–4
Volkswagen	Beetle	1157	(United States) Blake Wilkey	1–2
Volkswagen	Beetle	1184	(United States) Josh Felix	1–4

== Driver standings ==
=== Group E ===
Rank	Driver	(Virginia) RVA1	(Virginia) RVA2	(Utah) UMC1	(Utah) UMC2	(Arizona) FBP1	(Arizona) FBP2	(Florida) MIA1	(Florida) MIA2	(Nevada) LAS1	(Nevada) LAS2	Pts
1	(Sweden) Robin Larsson	1	4	2	2							219
2	(Sweden) Oliver Eriksson	2	1	3	3							207
3	(Norway) Andreas Bakkerud	7	8	1	1							191
4	(Jamaica) Fraser McConnell	3	2	4	7							177
5	(United States) Tanner Foust	8	5	6	4							139
6	(United States) Conner Martell	5	7	7	8							131
7	(Belgium) Viktor Vranckx	4	3	8	9							129
8	(United States) Lia Block	6	6	9	5							114
9	(Sweden) Kevin Eriksson	9	WD	5	6							73

Key
Color	Result
Gold	Winner
Silver	2nd place
Bronze	3rd place
Green	Other finishing position
Blue	Non Points finish
Purple	Did not finish
Pink	Did not qualify (DNQ)
Black	Disqualified (DSQ)
Brown	Withdrew (WD)
White	Did not start (DNS)
White	Race cancelled (C)

=== NEXT ===
Rank	Driver	(Virginia) RVA1	(Virginia) RVA2	(Utah) UMC1	(Utah) UMC2	(Arizona) FBP1	(Arizona) FBP2	(Florida) MIA1	(Florida) MIA2	(Nevada) LAS1	(Nevada) LAS2	Pts
1	(United States) Mitchell DeJong	1	2	2	1							240
2	(Finland) Tommi Hallman	2	1	1	2							237
3	(Sweden) Casper Jansson	8	3	3	3							191
4	(United States) Lane Vacala	3	8	5	5							155
5	(United States) Ellis Spiezia	4	5	7	4							141
6	(United States) Michael Leach	7	4	6	7							135
7	(United States) Patrick Gruszka	6	7	4	6							129
8	(United States) Alastair Scully	9	9	9	9							81
9	(United States) Kainan Baker	5	6									64
10	(Belgium) David Sterckx			8	8							47
11	(United States) Eric Gordon			10	10							34

=== SxS ===
Rank	Driver	(Virginia) RVA1	(Virginia) RVA2	(Utah) UMC1	(Utah) UMC2	(Arizona) FBP1	(Arizona) FBP2	(Florida) MIA1	(Florida) MIA2	(Nevada) LAS1	(Nevada) LAS2	Pts
1	(United States) Kainan Baker	7	1	6	1							206
2	(United States) Travis Pastrana	3	2	1								183
3	(United States) Kory Willis	2	3	7	4							174
4	(United States) Cash LeCroy	1	9	2	5							169
5	(United States) Jacob Geisendorff	6	10	3	8							138
6	(United States) Gray Leadbetter	5	7	5	3							136
7	(United States) Jacob Rosales	8	6	10	12							83
8	(United States) Banks Hovey		8		2							76
9	(United States) Nate Wessel	4	5									76
10	(United States) Hailie Deegan			4	9							61
11	(United States) Tyler Remmereid	9	4									57
12	(United States) Mia Chapman	10	11	12	11							57
13	(United States) Luke Roberts			9	6							50
14	(United States) Mika Block				7							29
15	(United States) Terry Madden			8								26
16	(United States) Lucy Block				10							17
17	(United States) Kira Block			11								14
18	(United States) Lyn-Z Pastrana	11										14
