= Fraser McConnell =

Jamaican racing driver

- Nationality: (Jamaica) Jamaican
- Born: 9 September 1998 (age 28) Bog Walk, St. Catherine, Jamaica

Nitrocross career
- Debut season: 2021
- Current team: Dreyer & Reinbold Racing Dodge
- Car number: 35
- Starts: 24
- Wins: 4
- Podiums: 9
- Best finish: 2nd in 2023–24

Championship titles
- 2019: Americas Rallycross ARX2

Fraser McConnell (born September 9, 1998) is a Jamaican professional racing driver. McConnell is the most competitively successful Jamaican driver in the history of international rallycross racing—his championship victory in the 2019 Americas RallyCross Championship marked the first and only championship win by a Jamaican driver in the series’ history. In 2021, McConnell became the first and only Jamaican to claim a supercar victory in the Rally X Nordic league. In 2021, McConnell's debut supercar campaign received public recognition from Usain Bolt and Jamaican Prime Minister Andrew Holness.

McConnell currently competes professionally in the Group E class of Nitrocross under the Dreyer & Reinbold Racing team.

== Early life ==
McConnell was born in Bog Walk in St. Catherine, Jamaica. McConnell began karting, motocross, and rally at the age of eight. He achieved early success throughout his junior career, being named Jamaican Driver of the Year twice, and later claiming victory at Jamaica's nationally competitive Dover Race Track at the age of 16.

== Racing career ==
McConnell made his rallycross career debut in 2018, competing in North America's ARX2 series. In his first race, McConnell recorded the fastest-out-of-the-box time, and ultimately reached the final four times out of five. In the final round of the season, McConnell achieved a podium finish.

In 2019, McConnell made his international racing debut with Olsbergs MSE. That same year, McConnell won the ARX2 championship, marking the first time in history for a Jamaican to lift the title.

In 2021, McConnell secured his first supercar victory, defeating three-time FIA world champion Johan Kristoffersson at the RallyX Nordic in Nysum, Denmark.

McConnell joined Lewis Hamilton's Team X44 in Extreme E for the 2023 season. He replaced Sébastien Loeb as Cristina Gutiérrez's partner.

== Racing record ==
=== Complete Nitro Rallycross results ===
==== Supercar ====
Year	Entrant	Car	1	2	3	4	5	Rank	Points
2021	Olsbergs MSE	Ford Fiesta ST	UTA; 4	ERX; 5	WHP; 10	HLN; 11	FIR; 15	9th	71

==== Group E ====
Year	Entrant	Car	1	2	3	4	5	6	7	8	9	10	Rank	Points
2022-23	Dreyer & Reinbold Racing	FC1-X	GBR; 4	SWE; 4	ERX; 3	GHR; 1	WHP1; 6	WHP2; 6	QBC; 4	GHR2; 2	GHR3; 9	GHR4; 2	3rd	348
2023-24	Dreyer & Reinbold Racing	FC1-X	MID; 1	UMC1; 11	UMC2; 4	WHP1; 1	WHP2; 2	HLN1; 5	HLN2; 2	LAS; 1	LAS; 4		2nd	504
2024-25	Dreyer & Reinbold Racing Dodge	Dodge Hornet R/T FC1-X	RIC1; 3	RIC2; 2	UMC1	UMC2	FMP1	FMP2	MIA1	MIA2	LAS1	LAS2	2nd	107

=== Complete Extreme E results ===
(key)

Year	Team	Car	1	2	3	4	5	6	7	8	9	10	Pos.	Points
2022	JBXE	Spark ODYSSEY 21	DES	ISL1	ISL2	COP	ENE; 9						21st	2
2023	X44 Vida Carbon Racing	Spark ODYSSEY 21	DES; 1; 4	DES; 2; 6	HYD; 1; 1	HYD; 2; 9	ISL1; 1; 8	ISL1; 2; 8	ISL2; 1; 9	ISL2; 2; 1	COP; 1; 3	COP; 2; 3	4th	109
2024	Acciona | Sainz XE Team	Spark ODYSSEY 21	DES; 1; 4	DES; 2; 1	HYD; 1; 2	HYD; 2; 2	ISL1; 1 C	ISL1; 2 C	ISL2; 1 C	ISL2; 2 C	VAL; 1 C	VAL; 2 C	2nd ^{†}	76 ^{†}
2025	Acciona | Sainz XE Team	Spark ODYSSEY 21	DES; 1; 4	DES; 2; 8									N/A	N/A

^{†} Season abandoned.
