= GMC Stadium =

GMC Stadium may refer to:

- GMC Stadium (Calgary), Alberta, Canada
- Arsenal BG Ballpark, known as GMC Stadium from 2002 to 2006, Sauget, Illinois, United States
- GMC Athletic Stadium, Bambolim, Goa, India
