= Andreas Bakkerud =

Norwegian rally driver

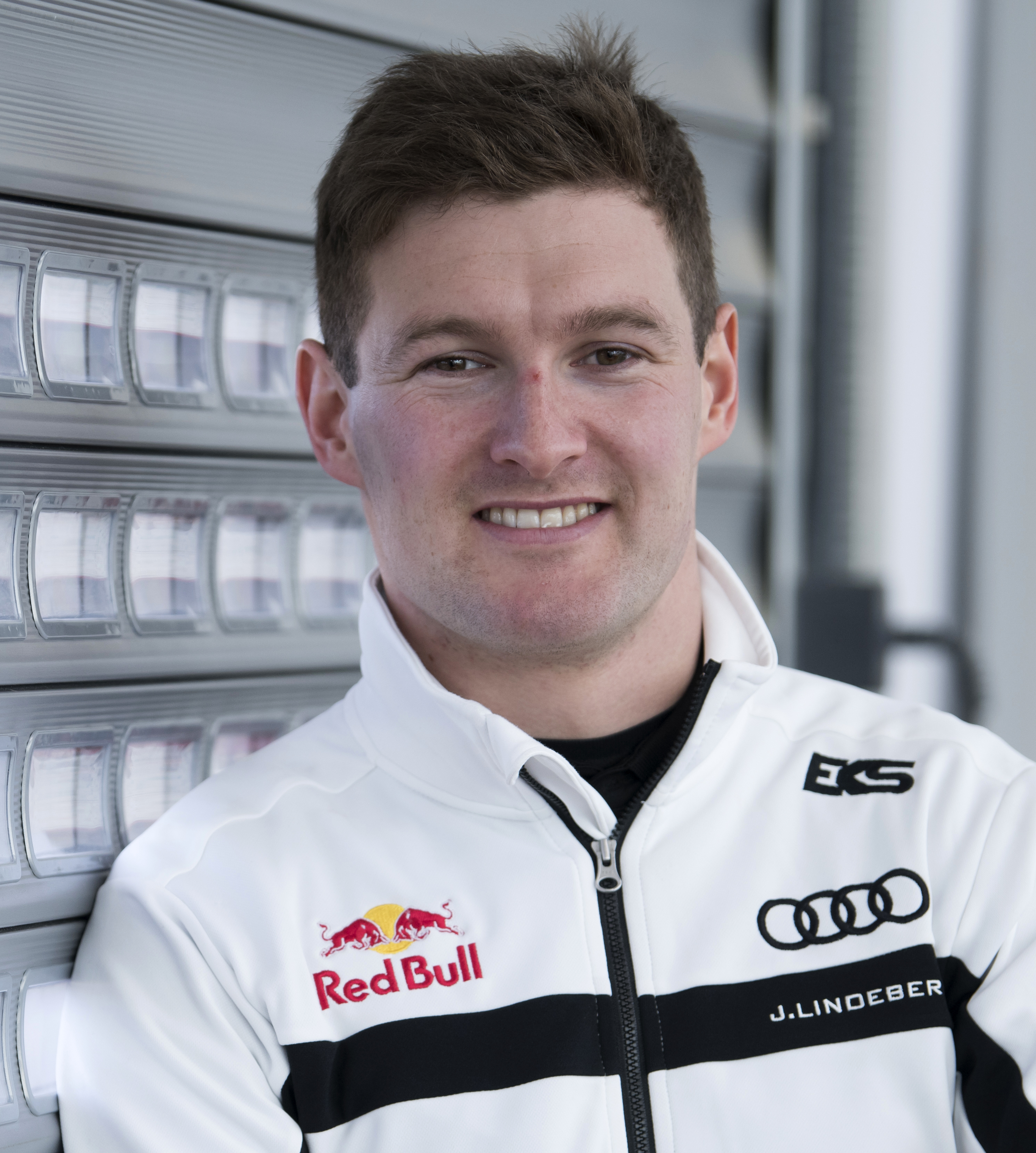
- Bakkerud in March 2018
- Nationality: Norwegian
- Born: 10 October 1991 (age 35) Bergen, Norway

Nitrocross career
- Current team: Dreyer & Reinbold Racing JC Dodge
- Years active: 2021–2024
- Car number: 13
- Starts: 24
- Wins: 4
- Podiums: 11
- Best finish: 2nd in 2022-2023

Extreme E career
- Years active: 2023
- Teams: JBXE
- Car number: 22
- Starts: 4

FIA World Rallycross Championship
- Years active: 2014–2020
- Car number: 13
- Former teams: Olsbergs MSE; Hoonigan Racing Division; EKS RX; Monster Energy RX Cartel
- Starts: 79
- Wins: 7
- Podiums: 30
- Best finish: 2nd in 2019

FIA ERX Supercar Championship
- Years active: 2013, 2021-2023
- Former teams: Bakkerud Motorsport; ES Motorsport
- Starts: 17
- Championships: 1 (2021)
- Wins: 4
- Podiums: 7

FIA ERX Super1600 Championship
- Years active: 2011–2012
- Former teams: Set Promotion
- Starts: 20
- Championships: 2 (2011, 2012)
- Wins: 7
- Podiums: 15

FIA ERX Division 1A Championship
- Years active: 2009–2010
- Former teams: Set Promotion
- Starts: 12
- Wins: 1
- Podiums: 4
- Best finish: 3rd in 2010

Andreas Bakkerud (born 10 October 1991) is a rallycross driver from Bergen, Norway. He has competed in the FIA Rallycross Supercar class since 2013 in both Euro RX and World RX, Nitro Rallycross since 2021, and Extreme E since 2023. He became European Champion in 2021.

He is not related to former DTM driver Christian Bakkerud.

== Biography ==
Bakkerud won the FIA European Rallycross Championship in the Super1600 category twice, in 2011 and 2012.

Bakkerud entered the FIA European Rallycross Supercar class in 2013 with a private Citroën DS3, finishing fourth with two wins.

In 2014, Bakkerud joined the FIA World Rallycross Championship Supercar class, driving a Ford-supported Olsbergs MSE Fiesta. He got two wins and three second-place finishes, and placed fifth in the overall standings. In 2015, he scored a win, three podiums and eight top-fives, which put him fourth in the Supercar drivers championship.

In 2016, Bakkerud moved to American outfit Hoonigan Racing Division, partnering team boss Ken Block. He claimed three wins and six podiums, earning a third place in the 2016 FIA World Rallycross Supercar standings.

On June 12, 2016, Bakkerud made rallycross history in Hell, Norway, during Round Five of the 2016 FIA World Rallycross Championship by dominating the entire event and bringing home a first overall finish. Bakkerud set numerous records on his outright domination that weekend by winning all four of his Qualifier races (no driver had ever won all four in a weekend previously) and then going on to storm to the top in both his Semi-final and the Final. The overall win was the first-ever for the all-new Ford Focus RS RX rallycross car that year (a racecar that was still in its first year of competition and development), the first-ever in World RX for Hoonigan Racing Division and the first-ever win at the Norway round of the World Championship by a Norwegian.

With the announcement that Hoonigan Racing would be withdrawing from the sport at the end of the 2017 season, Bakkerud was left to find a drive for the new season, an on 31 January 2018 announced that he would be joining the EKS Audi Sport team, driving an Audi S1 EKS RX quattro. He finished third in the 2018 season behind the dominant Volkswagens of Johan Kristoffersson and Petter Solberg, scoring six podiums, before EKS too pulled out of the championship.

Bakkerud would remain in World RX for 2019, teaming up with Liam Doran in the Monster Energy RX Cartel team, using the EKS Audi's. Bakkerud scored a total of six podiums during the season. He finished the season tied on points with Timmy Hansen, but was classified 2nd as he scored one victory compared to Hansen's five.

== Racing record ==
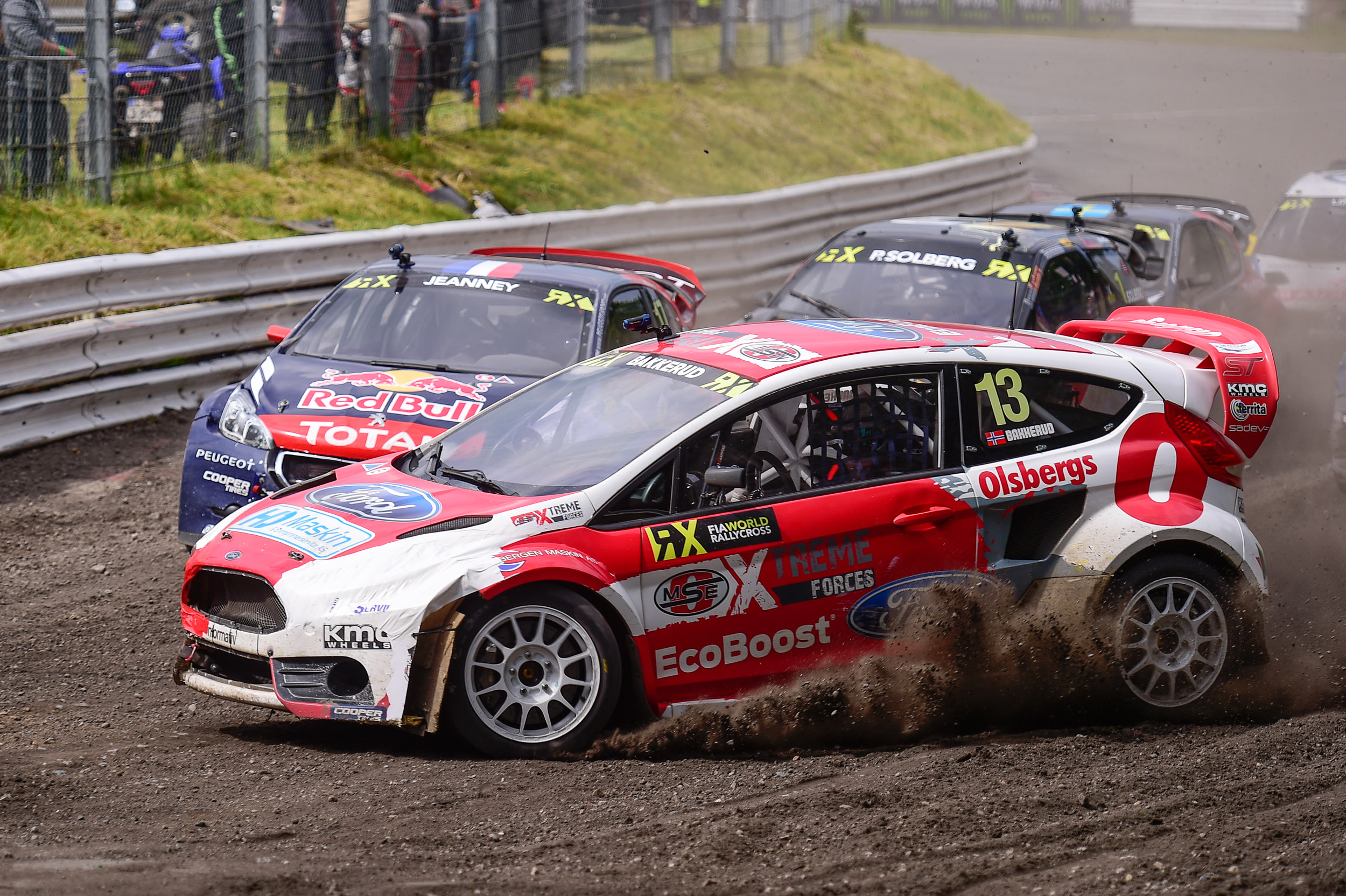
Bakkerud driving the Ford Fiesta Mk.6 of OlsbergsMSE at the 2015 World RX of Germany

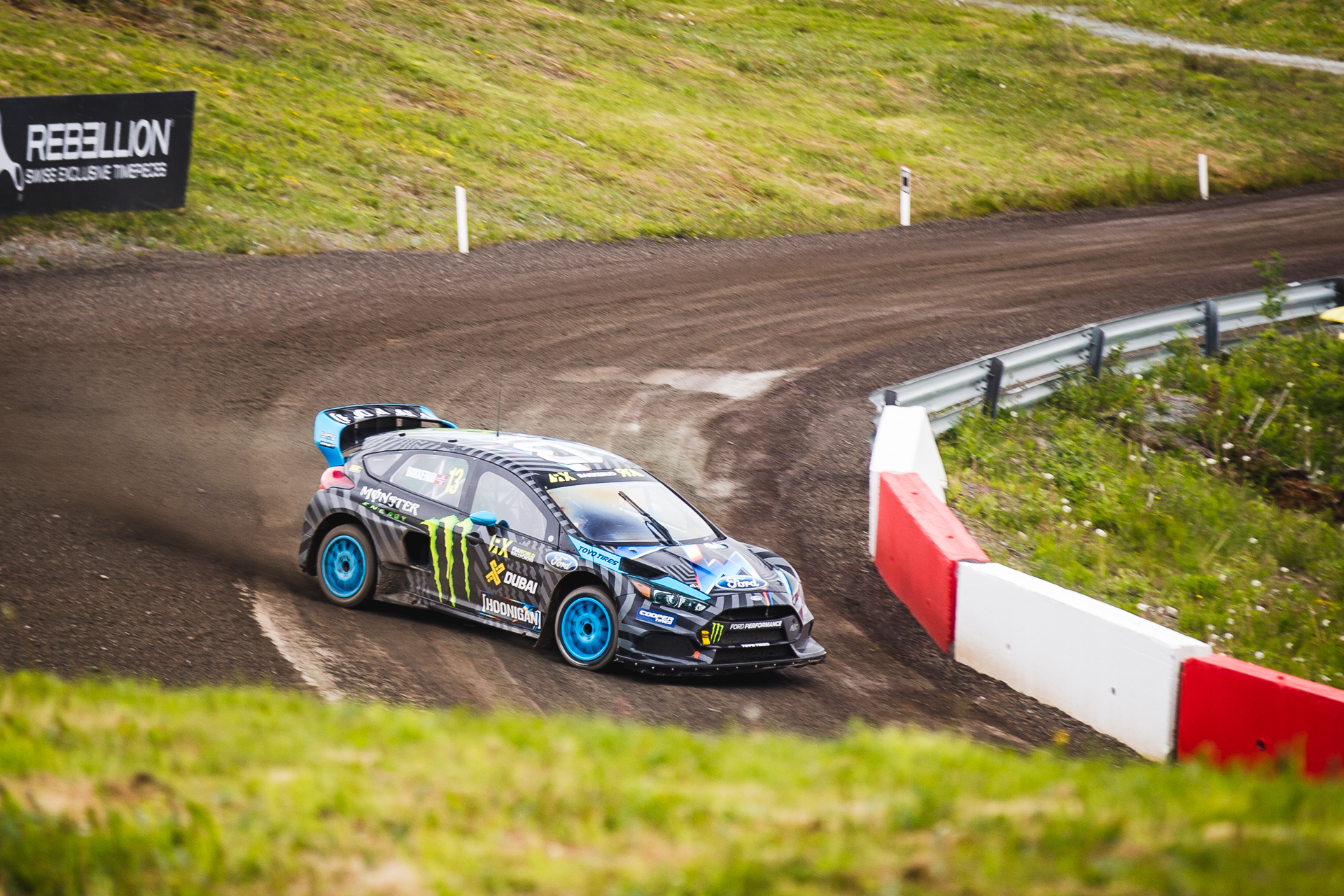
Bakkerud driving the Ford Focus Mk.3 of Hoonigan Racing Division at the 2016 World RX of Norway

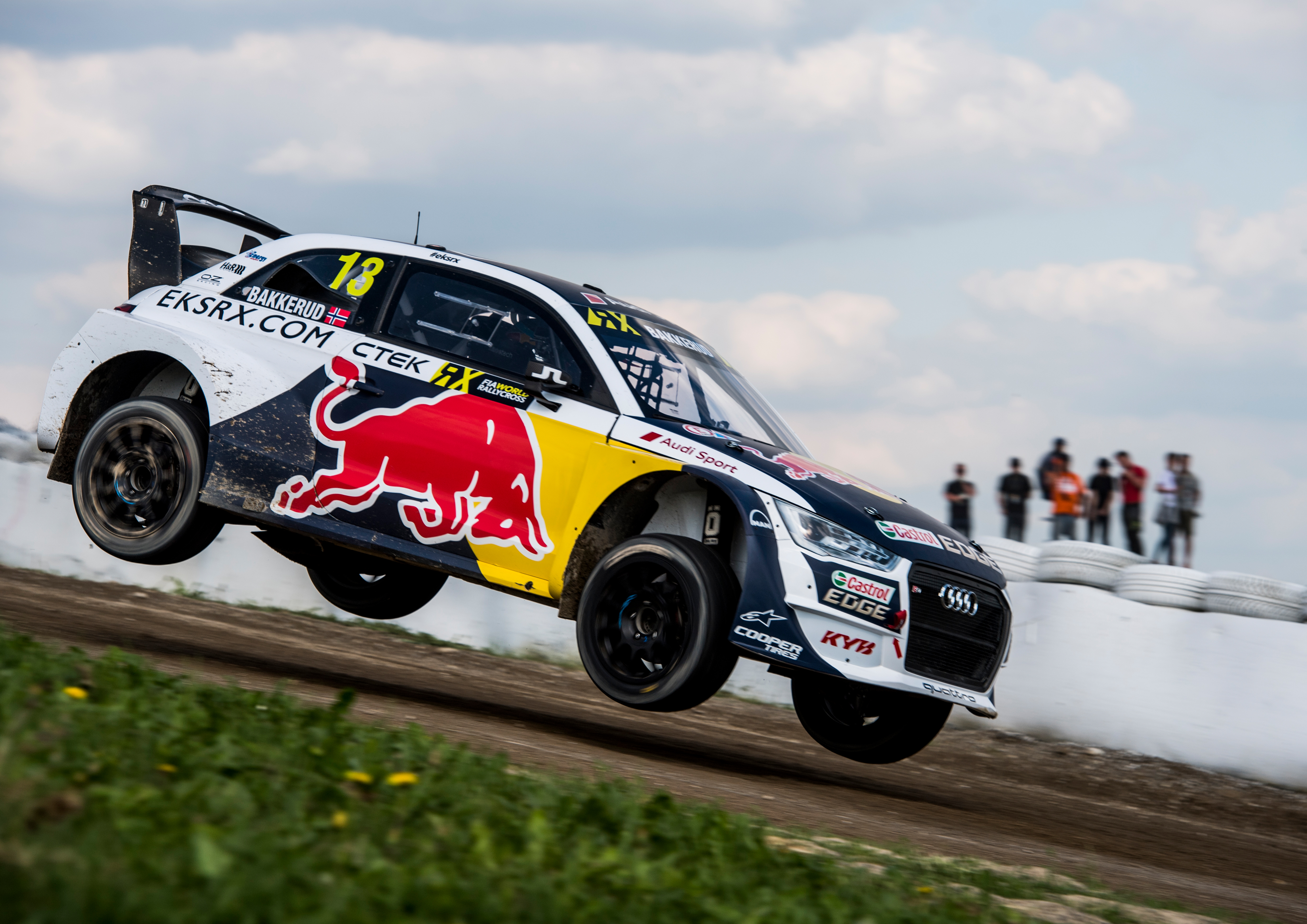
Bakkerud driving the Audi S1 Mk.1 of EKS RX at the 2018 World RX of Belgium

=== Complete FIA European Rallycross Championship results ===
(key)

==== Division 1A ====
Year	Entrant	Car	1	2	3	4	5	6	7	8	9	10	ERX	Points
2009	Set Promotion	Peugeot 206	GBR	POR	FRA	HUN	AUT	SWE; 13	BEL	GER	POL; 2	CZE; 5	13th	33
2010	Set Promotion	Peugeot 206	POR; 2	FRA; 10	GBR; 6	HUN; 4	SWE	FIN; 6	BEL; 8	GER; 4			3rd	109
2010	Set Promotion	Renault Clio									POL; 2	CZE; 1	3rd	109

==== Super1600 ====
Year	Entrant	Car	1	2	3	4	5	6	7	8	9	10	ERX	Points
2011	Set Promotion	Renault Clio	GBR; 1	POR; 1	FRA; 2	NOR; 2	SWE; 6	BEL; 2	NED; 1	AUT; 11	POL; 3	CZE; 1	1st	146
2012	Set Promotion	Renault Twingo	GBR; 2	FRA; 1	AUT; 2	HUN; 1	NOR; 6	SWE; 3	BEL; 7	NED; 1	FIN; 5	GER; 2	1st	138

==== Supercar ====
Year	Entrant	Car	1	2	3	4	5	6	7	8	9	ERX	Points
2013	Bakkerud Motorsport	Citroën DS3	GBR; 12	POR; 7	HUN; 15	FIN; 6	NOR; 5	SWE; 1	FRA; 1	AUT; 13	GER; 2	4th	133
2021	ES Motorsport	Škoda Fabia	SWE; 3	FRA; 4	LAT; 7	BEL; 1						1st	90
2022	ES Motorsport	Audi S1	HUN	SWE; 3	NOR; 1	LVA	POR	BLX				8th	33
2023	Bakkerud Motorsport	Audi S1	HUN; 6	POR	NOR	SWE; 7	BLX	GER				10th	20

=== Complete FIA World Rallycross Championship results ===
(key)

==== Supercar ====
Year	Entrant	Car	1	2	3	4	5	6	7	8	9	10	11	12	13	WRX	Points
2014	Olsbergs MSE	Ford Fiesta ST	POR; 2	GBR; 1	NOR; 11	FIN; 2	SWE; 2	BEL; 29	CAN; 8	FRA; 9	GER; 11	ITA; 6	TUR; 1	ARG; 6		5th	193
2015	Olsbergs MSE	Ford Fiesta ST	POR; 4	HOC; 6	BEL; 5	GBR; 4	GER; 5	SWE; 3	CAN; 5	NOR; 11	FRA; 8	BAR; 10	TUR; 2	ITA; 1	ARG; 7	4th	232
2016	Hoonigan Racing Division	Ford Focus RS	POR; 4	HOC; 12	BEL; 14	GBR; 6	NOR; 1	SWE; 1	CAN; 2	FRA; 2	BAR; 7	LAT; 4	GER; 3	ARG; 1		3rd	239
2017	Hoonigan Racing Division	Ford Focus RS	BAR; 3	POR; 10	HOC; 14	BEL; 6	GBR; 3	NOR; 2	SWE; 2	CAN; 13	FRA; 4	LAT; 4	GER; 8	RSA; 7		6th	194
2018	EKS Audi Sport	Audi S1	BAR; 3	POR; 4	BEL; 6	GBR; 2	NOR; 6	SWE; 2	CAN; 7	FRA; 2	LAT; 8	USA; 3	GER; 3	RSA; 7		3rd	237
2019	Monster Energy RX Cartel	Audi S1	UAE; 15	ESP; 3	BEL; 2	GBR; 2	NOR; 8	SWE; 7	CAN; 1	FRA; 5	LAT; 3	RSA; 2				2nd	211
2020	Monster Energy GCK RX Cartel	Renault Mégane R.S. RX	SWE; 13	SWE; 6	FIN; 9	FIN; 6	LAT; 8	LAT; 7	ESP; 6	ESP; 5						7th	121

=== Complete Nitrocross results ===
Series called Nitro Rallycross until 2023

==== Supercar ====
Year	Entrant	Car	1	2	3	4	5	Rank	Points
2021	Subaru Motorsports USA	Subaru WRX STi	UMC; 9	ERX; 6	WHP	HLN; 3	FIR	8th	71

==== Group E ====
Year	Entrant	Car	1	2	3	4	5	6	7	8	9	10	Rank	Points
2022-23	Dreyer & Reinbold Racing JC	FC1-X	GBR; 2	SWE; 1	ERX; 4	HLN; 3	WHP1; 3	WHP2; 8	QBC; 7	HLN2; 1	HLN3; 3	HLN4; 3	2nd	371
2023-24	Dreyer & Reinbold Racing JC	FC1-X	MID; 7	UMC1; 3	UMC2; 5	WHP1; 5	WHP2; 6	HLN1; 6	HLN2; 9	LAS; 6	LAS; 8		4th	409
2024-25	Dreyer & Reinbold Racing JC Dodge	Dodge Hornet R/T FC1-X	RIC1; 7	RIC2; 8	UMC1; 1	UMC2; 1	FMP1	FMP2	MIA1	MIA2	LAS1	LAS2	3rd*	191*

=== Complete 24H GT Series results ===
==== GT4 ====
Year	Entrant	Car	1	2	3	4	5	6	7
2022	Car Collection Motorsport	Audi R8 LMS GT4 Evo	DUB	MUG	SPA; 5	HOC	POR; 2	BAR	KUW; 3

=== Complete Extreme E results ===
(key)

Year	Team	Car	1	2	3	4	5	6	7	8	9	10	Pos.	Points
2023	JBXE	Spark ODYSSEY 21	DES; 1	DES; 2	HYD; 1; 9	HYD; 2; 6	ISL1; 1; 10	ISL1; 2; 5	ISL2; 1; 7	ISL2; 2; 5	COP; 1; 8	COP; 2; 8	12th	45
2024	JBXE	Spark ODYSSEY 21	DES; 1; 7	DES; 2; 8	HYD; 1; 7	HYD; 2; 8	ISL1; 1 C	ISL1; 2 C	ISL2; 1 C	ISL2; 2 C	VAL; 1 C	VAL; 2 C	9th ^{†}	21 ^{†}
2025	Team Hansen	Spark ODYSSEY 21	DES; 1; 3	DES; 2; 1									N/A	N/A

^{†} Season abandoned.

Sporting positions
Preceded by None	European Rallycross Super1600 Champion; 2011-2012	Succeeded by Reinis Nitišs
