= RallyX Americas =

American rallycross series

- Country: United States, Canada
- Region: North America
- Inaugural season: 2026
- Official website: rallyx.se

RallyX Americas is an American rallycross series organized by RX Promotion. It is the organization's third rallycross championship which began with RallyX Nordic in 2018 and has aired races on FloSports, YouTube, and the Racer Network.

== History ==
On November 13, 2024, RallyX announced plans to expand the RallyX series across Europe and North America with an Americas league initially starting in 2025. On December 11, 2025, one year after the closure of Nitrocross, RallyX announced a North American expansion and had acquired the FC1-X cars which had been used in the Nitrocross series from 2022 to its closure in 2024. Also in the same announcement, RallyX confirmed the inaugural schedule which would have rounds at Crandon International Raceway, Eldora Speedway, and Circuit Trois-Rivières. On March 26, 2026, NASCAR drivers Austin Cindric and Shane van Gisbergen participated in open tests for the series at the Charlotte Motor Speedway in Concord, North Carolina. On April 9, 2026, RallyX announced the team entries which consisted of Hansen Motorsport, SET Promotion, JC Raceteknik, and Olsbergs MSE. On June 4, 2026, Timmy Hansen announced his plans to race in RallyX Americas. On June 10, 2026, RallyX announced that they would be partnering with the Racer Network to air their races in the United States.

== Circuits ==
RallyX Americas tracks are purpose built with mixed surfaces and jumps. The series has also used tracks which were previously used by the Off-Road Championship such as Eldora Speedway and Crandon International Off-Road Raceway and the FIA World Rallycross Championship such as Circuit Trois-Rivières.

== Race format ==
Race weekends featured the main electric FC1 class, and the FC2 Supercar class. RallyX Americas uses an adapted version of the "tried and true" racing format as used in Europe. The driver's fastest lap time in Timed Practice decides their starting position for the first round of Qualifying Heats, with the fastest driver starting on pole position in the last Heat race.

There are three rounds of Qualifying Heats (Q1, Q2 & Q3), with a maximum of 5 cars over 4 laps. Drivers start abreast on the starting grid. Q1 starting positions are decided by Timed Practice, while the subsequent starting orders in Q2 & Q3 are set by the classification of the previous Qualifying Heat. The Qualifying Heats are timed, and drivers are awarded qualifying points on their time against the other drivers. Qualifying points do not count as championship points.

After Qualifying Heats, drivers are ranked in an intermediate classification on their combined qualifying points across the three Heats sessions. The top 12 drivers in the intermediate ranking qualify for the 2 Semi-Final races, with 1st/3rd/5th/7th/9th/11th-ranked drivers racing in Semi-Final 1, and 2nd/4th/6th/8th/10/12th-ranked drivers in Semi-Final 2. Semi-Finals include 6 drivers (starting in 3 staggered rows of 2 drivers) and take place over 5 laps. The top 3 finishers from each Semi-Final will qualify into the A Final. The 4th, 5th & 6th-placed finishers in the Semi-Finals will qualify into the B Final. The Finals are run over 5 laps with 6 drivers.

Drivers are awarded championship points on their finishing positions in the Qualifying intermediate ranking, the Semi-Finals, and the Finals. The winner of the Final is the winner of the competition.
