= Robin Larsson =

Swedish racing driver

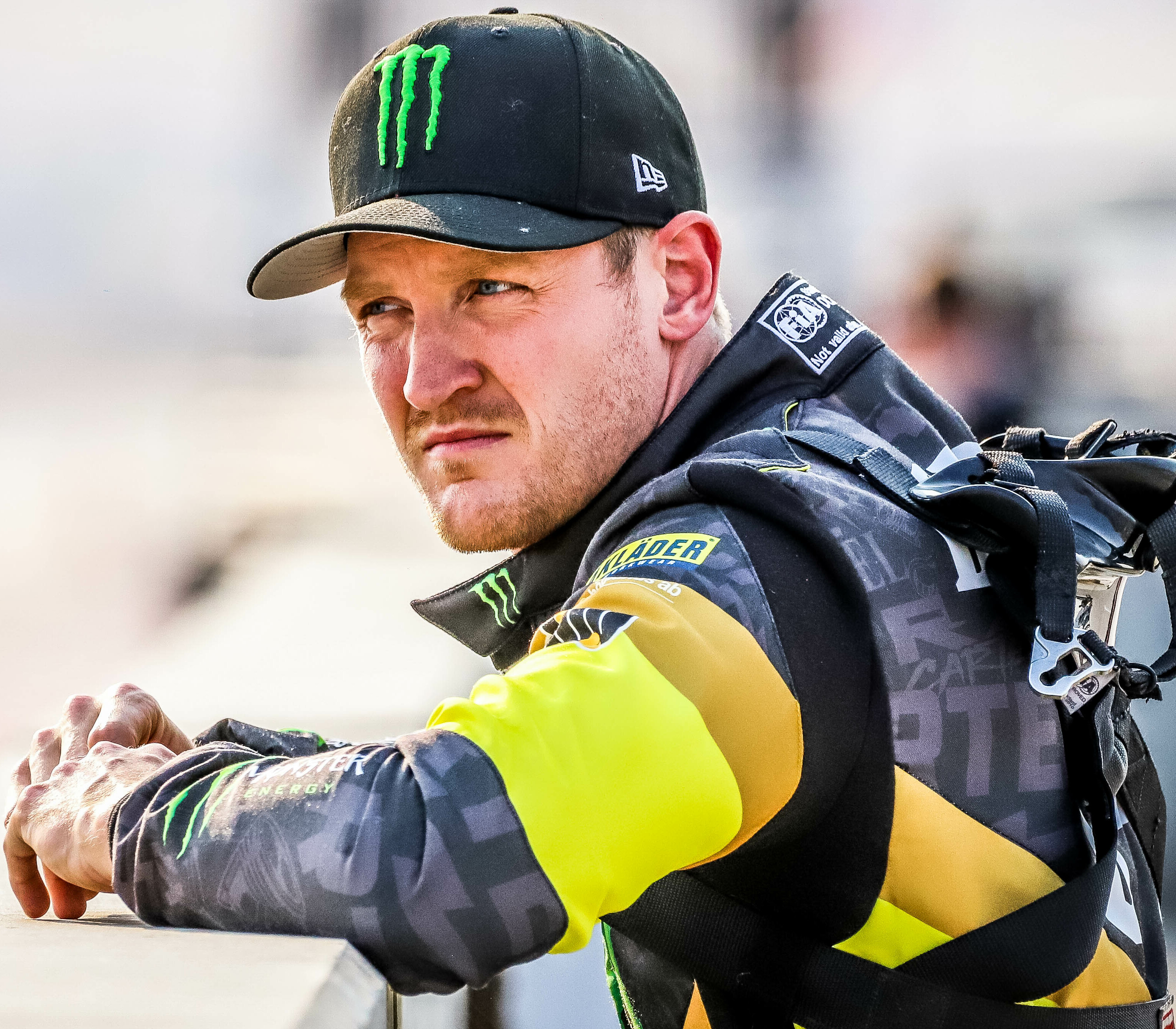
- Nationality: (Sweden) Swedish
- Born: Robin Christian Zacharias Larsson; 8 July 1992 (age 34) Svenljunga, Sweden
- Relatives: Lars Larsson (father)

Nitrocross career
- Debut season: 2021
- Current team: Dreyer & Reinbold Racing JC Dodge
- Car number: 4
- Starts: 28
- Wins: 8
- Podiums: 18
- Best finish: 1st in 2022–23 & 2023-24

FIA World Rallycross Championship
- Years active: 2014 - 2020
- Car number: 4
- Former teams: JC Raceteknik; Larsson Jernberg Motorsport; Olsbergs MSE
- Starts: 53
- Wins: 1
- Podiums: 6
- Best finish: 8th in 2015
- Finished last season: 6th in 2020

FIA ERX Supercar Championship
- Years active: 2014, 2017
- Former teams: Larsson Jernberg Motorsport
- Starts: 10
- Championships: 2 (2014, 2019)
- Wins: 3
- Podiums: 6

Championship titles
- 2014, 2019 2022–23 2023–24: European Rallycross; Nitro Rallycross; Nitrocross

Robin Christian Zacharias Larsson (born 8 July 1992) is a Swedish racing driver currently competing in Nitrocross. He has won the Nitrcross championship the twice, in 2022–23 and 2023-24 driving for Dreyer & Reinbold Racing JC respectively. He previously won the 2014 FIA European Rallycross Supercar Championship. He is the son of double European Rallycross Champion Lars Larsson.

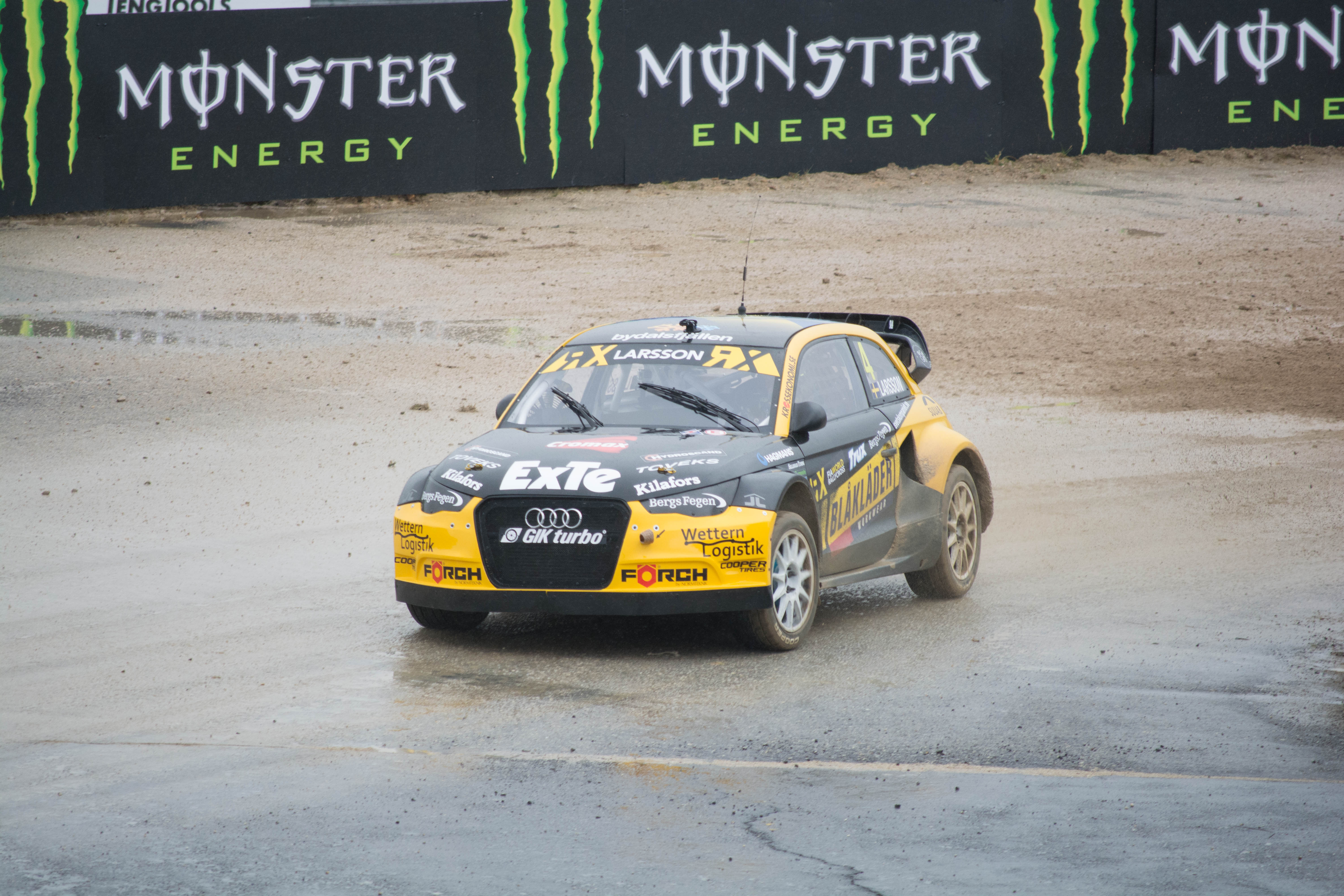
Larsson competing in the 2016 World RX of Portugal.

== Racing record ==
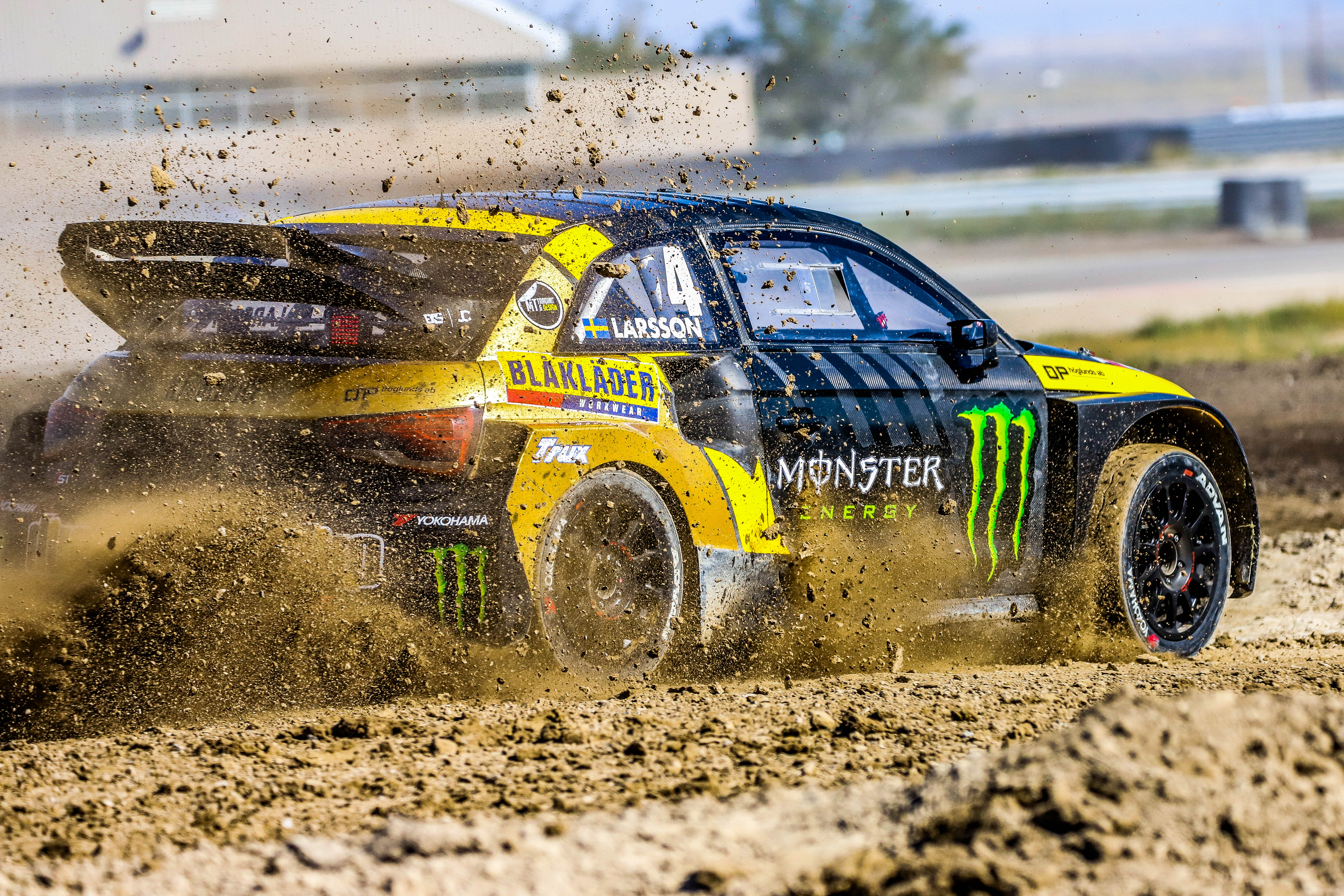
Larsson competing in the Nitro Rallycross.

=== Complete FIA European Rallycross Championship results ===
(key)

==== TouringCar ====
Year	Entrant	Car	1	2	3	4	5	6	7	8	9	10	ERX	Points
2012	Robin Larsson	Škoda Fabia	GBR	FRA	AUT; 1	HUN; NC	NOR; NC	SWE; 1	BEL; 1	NED; 2	FIN; 1	GER; 1	4th	100
2013	Robin Larsson	Škoda Fabia	GBR; 2	POR; 1	HUN; 5	FIN; 6	NOR; 10	SWE; 5	FRA; 6	AUT; 2	GER; 1		2nd	170

==== Supercar ====
Year	Entrant	Car	1	2	3	4	5	ERX	Points
2014	Robin Larsson	Audi A1	GBR; 1	NOR; 11	BEL; 1	GER; 2	ITA; 2	1st	67
2017	Robin Larsson	Audi A1	BAR; 8	NOR; 1	SWE; 8	FRA; 14	LAT; 2	4th	88

=== Complete FIA World Rallycross Championship results ===
(key)

==== Supercar ====
Year	Entrant	Car	1	2	3	4	5	6	7	8	9	10	11	12	13	WRX	Points
2014	Robin Larsson	Audi A1	POR	GBR; 2	NOR; 20	FIN	SWE; 34	BEL; 6	CAN	FRA	GER; 3	ITA; 10	TUR	ARG		9th	76
2015	Robin Larsson	Audi A1	POR; 9	HOC; 5	BEL; 14	GBR; 12	GER; 9	SWE; 34	CAN; 18	NOR; 3	FRA; 6	BAR; 6	TUR; 10	ITA; 8	ARG; 1	8th	147
2016	Robin Larsson	Audi A1	POR; 2	HOC; 6	BEL; 13	GBR; 15	NOR; 10	SWE; 8	CAN; 16	FRA; 10	BAR; 5	LAT; 12	GER; 13	ARG; 6		9th	109
2017	Robin Larsson	Audi A1	BAR	POR	HOC; 13	BEL	GBR	NOR	SWE	CAN	FRA	LAT	GER	RSA		21st	4
2018	Olsbergs MSE	Ford Fiesta ST	BAR; 9	POR; 13	BEL; 7	GBR; 13	NOR; 10	SWE; 12	CAN; 12†	FRA; 21†	LAT; 17	USA; 14	GER; 12	RSA; 15		15th	34
2019	JC Raceteknik	Audi S1	UAE	ESP	BEL	GBR	NOR	SWE	CAN	FRA	LAT; 19	RSA				34th	0

^{†} Loss of fifteen championship points – stewards' decision.

=== Complete Nitro Rallycross results ===
==== Supercar ====
Year	Entrant	Car	1	2	3	4	5	Rank	Points
2021	Monster Energy RX Cartel	Audi S1	UTA; 11	ERX; 6	WHP; 9	HLN; 8	FIR; 5	7th	73

==== Group E ====
Year	Entrant	Car	1	2	3	4	5	6	7	8	9	10	Rank	Points
2022-23	Dreyer & Reinbold Racing JC	FC1-X	GBR; 1	SWE; 2	ERX; 2	GHR; 2	WHP1; 5	WHP2; 1	QBC; 3	GHR2; 8	GHR3; 4	GHR4; 1	1st	403
2023-24	Dreyer & Reinbold Racing JC	FC1-X	MID; 2	UMC1; 6	UMC2; 1	WHP1; 2	WHP2; 1	HLN1; 3	HLN2; 1	LAS1; 2	LAS2; 1		1st	582
2024-25	Dreyer & Reinbold Racing JC Dodge	Dodge Hornet R/T FC1-X	RIC1; 1	RIC2; 4	UMC1; 2	UMC2; 2	FMP1	FMP2	MIA1	MIA2	LAS1	LAS2	1st	219

Sporting positions
Preceded by Timur Timerzyanov	European Rallycross Supercar Champion; 2014	Succeeded by Tommy Rustad
