= 2023 Extreme E Championship =

Electric car racing season

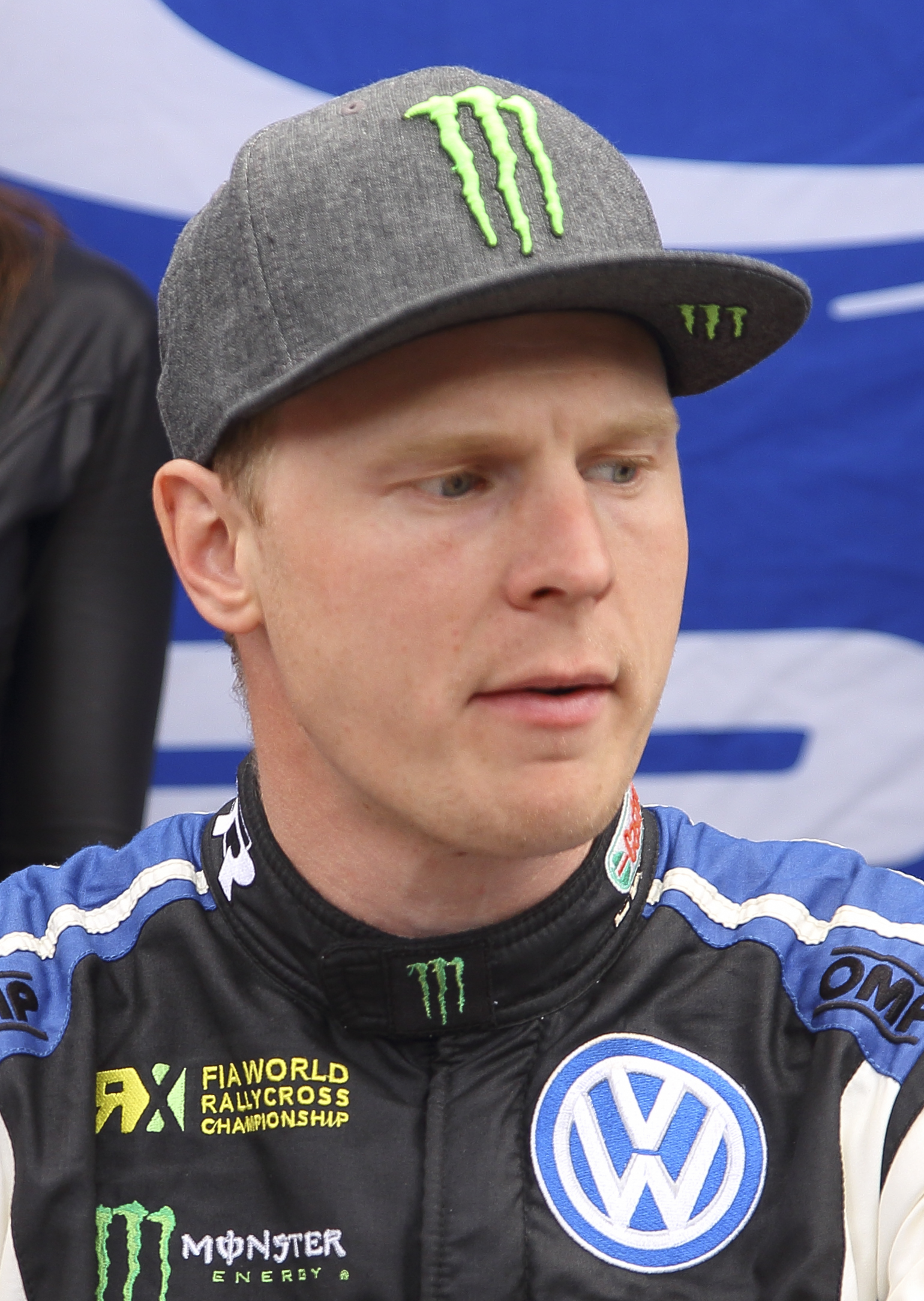
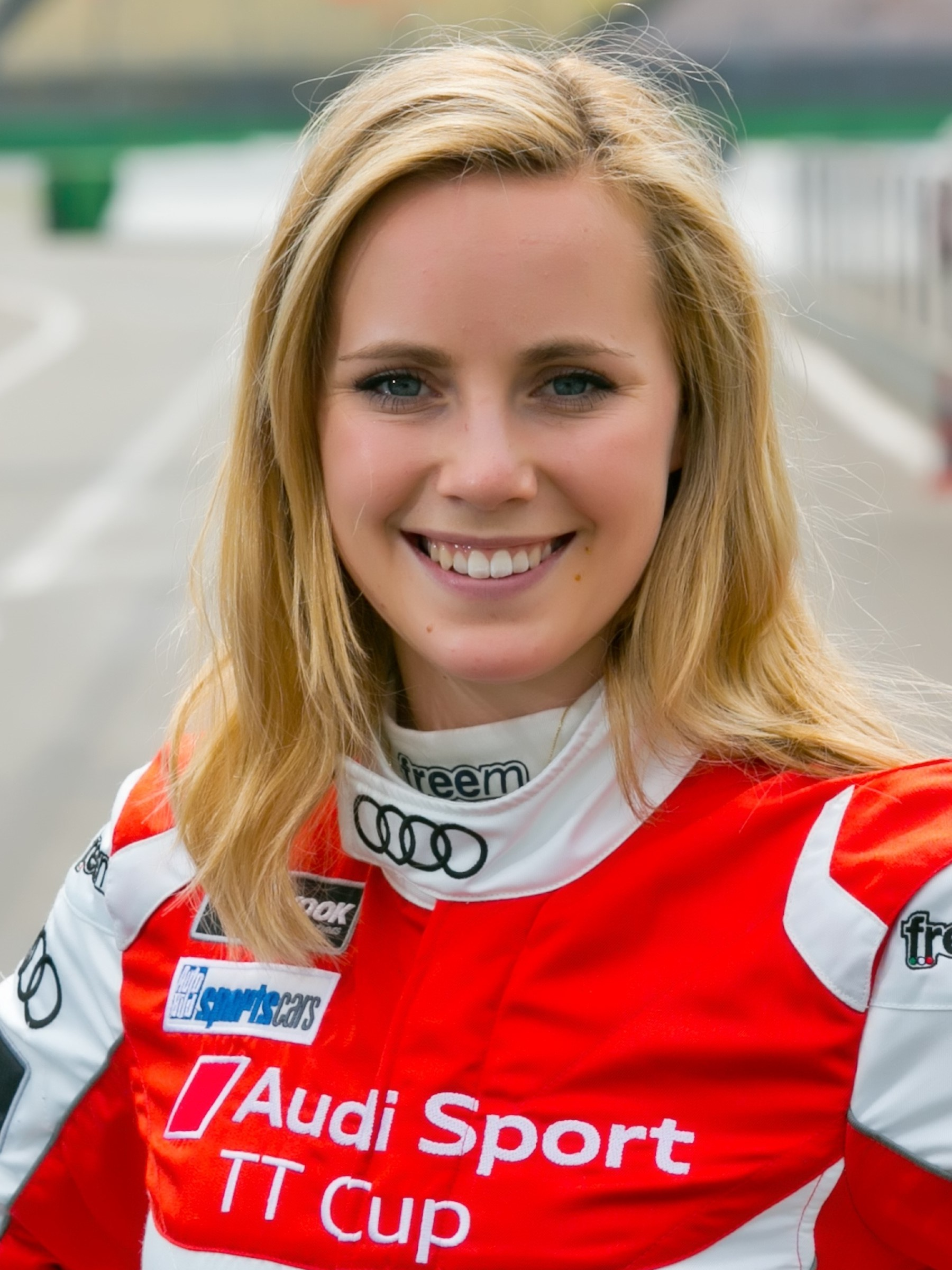
Johan Kristoffersson (left) and Mikaela Åhlin-Kottulinsky (right) won the championship driving for Rosberg X Racing.

The 2023 Extreme E Championship was the third season of the Extreme E electric off-road racing series.

== Calendar ==
On 16 November 2022, the provisional 2023 season calendar was announced. Saudi Arabia, Sardinia and Chile returned from the previous year, with the latter moving to December, while Scotland joined. A further race in America, to take place in either Brazil or the United States, was scheduled for September as a replacement for Uruguay. This was later set to move to Argentina, but the plans fell through, with a second event in Sardinia eventually announced on 29 August 2023 to fill the slot.

Round	Event	Location	Dates
1	Desert X-Prix	Neom, Saudi Arabia	11 March 2023
2	Desert X-Prix	Neom, Saudi Arabia	12 March 2023
3	Hydro X-Prix	(United Kingdom) Dumfries and Galloway, Scotland	13 May 2023
4	Hydro X-Prix	(United Kingdom) Dumfries and Galloway, Scotland	14 May 2023
5	Island X-Prix I	Sardinia, Italy	8 July 2023
6	Island X-Prix I	Sardinia, Italy	9 July 2023
7	Island X-Prix II	Sardinia, Italy	16 September 2023
8	Island X-Prix II	Sardinia, Italy	17 September 2023
9	Copper X-Prix	Antofagasta, Chile	2 December 2023
10	Copper X-Prix	Antofagasta, Chile	3 December 2023

The following event was cancelled:

Event	Location	Original Dates
Amazon X-Prix or TBC X-Prix	Brazil, United States, or Argentina	16 September 2023
Amazon X-Prix or TBC X-Prix	Brazil, United States, or Argentina	17 September 2023

=== Race format ===
The weekend format was tweaked again prior to the start of season three. All events will now be double-headers, with one full round taking place on Saturday and another on Sunday. Qualifying was also updated, with time trials dropped in favour of five-car races: each of the two qualifying sessions will consist of two heats. With the aim of condensing the schedule into a single day, the race format that included a pair of semi-finals, a "crazy race" and a final was discontinued. It is now the combined qualifying results that determine what team advances where, with the top five qualifiers progressing to the grand final and the bottom five to the new "redemption race". This means that qualifying now limits how many championship points an entrant can score: a team qualifying in positions one to five can be classified fifth at worst, while a team qualifying sixth or lower can only aspire to sixth at best. The points system remained largely unchanged—the only variations being a reduction from 5 to 2 points for the fastest Super Sector, and the introduction of 1 point for the winner of a qualifying heat.

== Teams and drivers ==
All teams that competed in the 2022 championship remained in 2023, with the exception of Xite Energy Racing which was taken over by English DJ Carl Cox. All teams use one of the identical Odyssey 21 electric SUVs manufactured by Spark Racing Technology, with ABT Cupra XE and Chip Ganassi Racing running modified bodyworks. Each team consists of a male and a female driver, who share a car and have equal driving duties.

Team	No.	Drivers	Rounds
(United Kingdom) Veloce Racing	5	(Sweden) Kevin Hansen	All
(United Kingdom) Veloce Racing	5	(Australia) Molly Taylor	All
(Germany) Rosberg X Racing	6	(Sweden) Johan Kristoffersson	All
(Germany) Rosberg X Racing	6	(Sweden) Mikaela Åhlin-Kottulinsky	All
(United Kingdom) Carl Cox Motorsport	8	(Spain) Christine GZ	1–4
(United Kingdom) Carl Cox Motorsport	8	(United States) Lia Block	5–10
(United Kingdom) Carl Cox Motorsport	8	(Germany) Timo Scheider	All
(United Kingdom) JBXE	22	(Norway) Hedda Hosås	1–8
(United Kingdom) JBXE	22	(Italy) Tamara Molinaro	9–10
(United Kingdom) JBXE	22	(Finland) Heikki Kovalainen	1–2
(United Kingdom) JBXE	22	(Norway) Andreas Bakkerud	3–10
(United States) Andretti Altawkilat Extreme E	23	(United Kingdom) Catie Munnings	All
(United States) Andretti Altawkilat Extreme E	23	(Sweden) Timmy Hansen	All
(United Kingdom) X44 Vida Carbon Racing	44	(Spain) Cristina Gutiérrez	All
(United Kingdom) X44 Vida Carbon Racing	44	(Jamaica) Fraser McConnell	All
(Spain) Acciona | Sainz XE Team	55	(Spain) Laia Sanz	All
(Spain) Acciona | Sainz XE Team	55	(Sweden) Mattias Ekström	All
(United Kingdom) Neom McLaren Extreme E Team	58	(New Zealand) Emma Gilmour	1–7
(United Kingdom) Neom McLaren Extreme E Team	58	(Italy) Tamara Molinaro	7–8
(United Kingdom) Neom McLaren Extreme E Team	58	(Norway) Hedda Hosås	9–10
(United Kingdom) Neom McLaren Extreme E Team	58	(United States) Tanner Foust	All
(United States) GMC Hummer EV Chip Ganassi Racing	99	(United States) Amanda Sorensen	All
(United States) GMC Hummer EV Chip Ganassi Racing	99	(United States) RJ Anderson	All
(Germany) Abt Cupra XE	125	(Sweden) Klara Andersson	All
(Germany) Abt Cupra XE	125	(Qatar) Nasser Al-Attiyah	1–4
(Germany) Abt Cupra XE	125	(France) Sébastien Loeb	5–8
(Germany) Abt Cupra XE	125	(France) Adrien Tambay	9–10

- A new team called XE Sports Group was scheduled to enter the series with backing from Australian footballer Tim Cahill, but deferred its entry to 2024.

Championship reserve drivers
Drivers	Rounds
(Norway) Andreas Bakkerud	1–2
(Finland) Tommi Hallman	3–4
(United Kingdom) Patrick O'Donovan	5–10
(Italy) Tamara Molinaro	1–8
(Spain) Christine GZ	9–10

== Results and standings ==
=== X-Prix ===
Round	Event	Qualifying 1		Qualifying 2		Qualifying Overall	Redemption Race	Super Sector (Note: Commercially known as the "Continental Traction Challenge".)	Grand Final
Round	Event	Heat 1	Heat 2	Heat 1	Heat 2	Qualifying Overall	Redemption Race	Super Sector	Grand Final
1	(Saudi Arabia) Desert X-Prix	(United States) Chip Ganassi	(United Kingdom) X44	(United Kingdom) Veloce	(Spain) Acciona | Sainz	(Spain) Acciona | Sainz	(United Kingdom) McLaren	(Spain) Acciona | Sainz	(United Kingdom) Veloce
2	(Saudi Arabia) Desert X-Prix	(United Kingdom) Veloce	(Germany) RXR	(United Kingdom) Veloce	(Germany) Abt Cupra	(United Kingdom) Veloce	(United Kingdom) X44	(United Kingdom) X44	(Spain) Acciona | Sainz
3	(United Kingdom) Hydro X-Prix	Cancelled (Note: Qualifying 1 was cancelled due to low-lying fog that prevented the medical helicopter from flying. Qualifying 2 was used to establish the overall qualifying results.)		(United Kingdom) X44	(Germany) RXR	(United Kingdom) X44	(Spain) Acciona | Sainz	(Spain) Acciona | Sainz	(United Kingdom) X44
4	(United Kingdom) Hydro X-Prix	(United States) Chip Ganassi	(Spain) Acciona | Sainz	(United States) Chip Ganassi	(United Kingdom) Veloce	(United States) Chip Ganassi	(United Kingdom) JBXE	(United Kingdom) Veloce	(United Kingdom) Veloce
5	(Italy) Island X-Prix I	(Germany) RXR	(United States) Andretti	(Spain) Acciona | Sainz	(United States) Chip Ganassi	(Spain) Acciona | Sainz	(United Kingdom) Veloce	(Spain) Acciona | Sainz	(Germany) RXR
6	(Italy) Island X-Prix I	(Germany) RXR	(United Kingdom) Veloce	(Germany) RXR	(Spain) Acciona | Sainz	(Germany) RXR	(Germany) Abt Cupra	(United States) Chip Ganassi	(Germany) RXR
7	(Italy) Island X-Prix II	(Spain) Acciona | Sainz	(Germany) Abt Cupra	(Spain) Acciona | Sainz	(Germany) RXR	(Spain) Acciona | Sainz	(United States) Andretti	(United States) Andretti	(Spain) Acciona | Sainz
8	(Italy) Island X-Prix II	(Germany) Abt Cupra	(Spain) Acciona | Sainz	(United Kingdom) X44	(United States) Chip Ganassi	(Germany) Abt Cupra	(United Kingdom) Veloce	(United States) Chip Ganassi	(United Kingdom) X44
9	(Chile) Copper X-Prix	(United Kingdom) Veloce	(United Kingdom) X44	(Spain) Acciona | Sainz	(Germany) RXR	(United Kingdom) X44	(United Kingdom) Carl Cox	(Germany) RXR	(Germany) RXR
10	(Chile) Copper X-Prix	(United Kingdom) McLaren	(Spain) Acciona | Sainz	(United Kingdom) Veloce	(United Kingdom) X44	(Spain) Acciona | Sainz	(United States) Chip Ganassi	(United Kingdom) X44	(United Kingdom) Veloce

Scoring system

Points are awarded to the top ten finishers. An additional 2 points are given to the fastest team in the Super Sector over the whole weekend. Starting from this season, the winning team and drivers in each qualifying heat get 1 extra point.

Position	1st	2nd	3rd	4th	5th	6th	7th	8th	9th	10th	QH	SS
Points	25	18	15	12	10	8	6	4	2	1	1	2 (Note: Only for the teams' championship.)

Only the best four X-Prix results count towards the drivers' championship.

=== Drivers' Championship standings ===
Pos.	Driver	DES (Saudi Arabia)		HYD (United Kingdom)		ISL1 (Italy)		ISL2 (Italy)		COP (Chile)		Points
1	(Sweden) Johan Kristoffersson (Sweden) Mikaela Åhlin-Kottulinsky	3	3^{H}	5^{H}	5	1^{H}	1^{HH}	4^{H}	2	1^{H}	2	159
2	(Spain) Laia Sanz (Sweden) Mattias Ekström	2^{H}	1	6	4^{H}	2^{H}	2^{H}	1^{HH}	9^{H}	2^{H}	4^{H}	144
3	(Sweden) Kevin Hansen (Australia) Molly Taylor	1^{H}	2^{HH}	7	1^{H}	6	7^{H}	3	6	5^{H}	1^{H}	138
4	(Spain) Cristina Gutiérrez (Jamaica) Fraser McConnell	4^{H}	6	1^{H}	9	8	8	9	1^{H}	3^{H}	3^{H}	109
5	(United States) Amanda Sorensen (United States) RJ Anderson	5^{H}	5	4	3^{HH}	3^{H}	4	8	4^{H}	7	6	95
6	(Sweden) Klara Andersson	9	4^{H}	10	8	4	6	2^{H}	3^{H}	DNS	7	76
7	(United Kingdom) Catie Munnings (Sweden) Timmy Hansen	10	8	2	7	5^{H}	3	6	7	DNS	WD	69
8	(United States) Tanner Foust	6	7	8	2	7	9	10	DNS	4	5^{H}	67
9	(Norway) Hedda Hosås	8	10	9	6	10	5	7	5	4	5^{H}	60
10	(France) Sébastien Loeb					4	6	2^{H}	3^{H}			55
11	(Germany) Timo Scheider	7	9	3	DNS	9	10	5	8	6	9	47
12	(Norway) Andreas Bakkerud			9	6	10	5	7	5	8	8	45
13	(New Zealand) Emma Gilmour	6	7	8	2	7	9	WD				44
14	(United States) Lia Block					9	10	5	8	6	9	27
15	(Spain) Christine GZ	7	9	3	DNS							23
16	(Qatar) Nasser Al-Attiyah	9	4^{H}	10	8							20
17	(Italy) Tamara Molinaro							10	DNS	8	8	9
18	(France) Adrien Tambay									DNS	7	6
19	(Finland) Heikki Kovalainen	8	10									5
Pos.	Driver	DES (Saudi Arabia)		HYD (United Kingdom)		ISL1 (Italy)		ISL2 (Italy)		COP (Chile)		Points

Key
Colour	Result
Gold	Winner
Silver	2nd place
Bronze	3rd place
Green	Other points position
Black	Disqualified (DSQ)
White	Did not start (DNS)
White	Withdrew (WD)
White	Race cancelled (C)

H – Qualifying heat winner
* – Fastest in Super Sector

=== Teams' Championship standings ===
Pos.	Team	DES (Saudi Arabia)		HYD (United Kingdom)		ISL1 (Italy)		ISL2 (Italy)		COP (Chile)		Points
1	(Germany) Rosberg X Racing	3	3^{H}	5^{H}	5	1^{H}	1^{HH}	4^{H}	2	1^{H}*	2	182
2	(Spain) Acciona | Sainz XE Team	2^{H}*	1	6*	4^{H}	2^{H}*	2^{H}	1^{HH}	9^{H}	2^{H}	4^{H}	171
3	(United Kingdom) Veloce Racing	1^{H}	2^{HH}	7	1^{H}*	6	7^{H}	3	6	5^{H}	1^{H}	155
4	(United Kingdom) X44 Vida Carbon Racing	4^{H}	6*	1^{H}	9	8	8	9	1^{H}	3^{H}	3^{H}*	121
5	(United States) GMC Hummer EV Chip Ganassi Racing	5^{H}	5	4	3^{HH}	3^{H}	4*	8	4^{H}*	7	6	113
6	(Germany) Abt Cupra XE	9	4^{H}	10	8	4	6	2^{H}	3^{H}	DNS	7	81
7	(United States) Andretti Altawkilat Extreme E	10	8	2	7	5^{H}	3	6*	7	DNS	WD	71
8	(United Kingdom) Neom McLaren Extreme E Team	6	7	8	2	7	9	10	DNS	4	5^{H}	68
9	(United Kingdom) Carl Cox Motorsport	7	9	3	DNS	9	10	5	8	6	9	50
10	(United Kingdom) JBXE	8	10	9	6	10	5	7	5	8	8	50
Pos.	Team	DES (Saudi Arabia)		HYD (United Kingdom)		ISL1 (Italy)		ISL2 (Italy)		COP (Chile)		Points
