= Nysum, Denmark =

Coordinates: 56°45′19″N 9°46′32″E

Nysum is a locality in the region of North Jutland in Denmark.

== Geography ==
The locality is situated in the North Denmark, approximately 34 km (21 miles) away from North Denmark's capital Aalborg, and 211 km (131 mi) away from Copenhagen.

== Culture ==
In 2021, Nysum was home to a Rally X Nordic supercar race, featuring international drivers such as Johan Kristofferson and Fraser McConnell.
