= Firebird Motorsports Park =

Motorsport venue in the United States

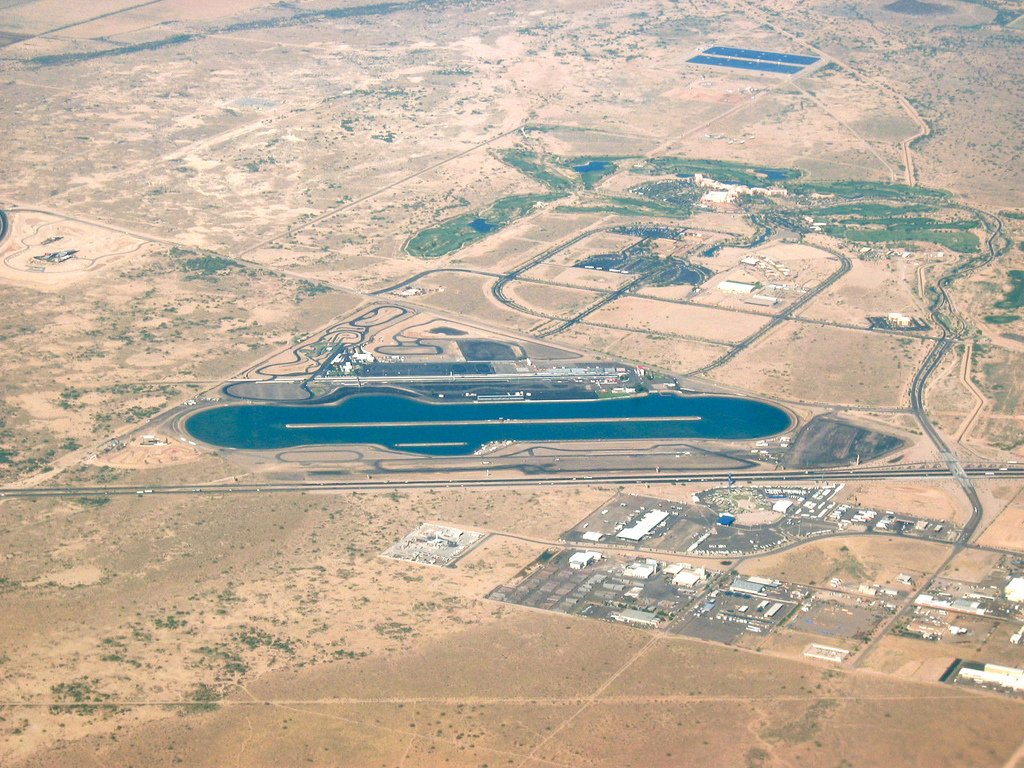
- Firebird Motorsports Park in 2010.
- Location: Chandler, Arizona, United States
- Coordinates: 33°16′8″N 111°57′58″W
- Owner: Gila River Indian Community
- Address: 20000 S Maricopa Rd
- Opened: 1983
- Former names: Firebird International Raceway (1983–2013); Wild Horse Pass Motorsports Park (2013–2023)
- Major events: Current: NHRA Mission Foods Drag Racing Series; NHRA Arizona Nationals (1985–present); Former: Nitrocross (2021–2023); Lucas Oil Off Road Racing Series (2010–2020); Formula D (2016); AMA Superbike Championship (1995); SCCA World Challenge (1992); Atlantic Championship (1985–1986, 1988); IMSA GT Championship (1987)
- Website: https://racefirebird.com/

East Course (1983–present)
- Surface: Asphalt
- Length: 2.012 km (1.250 mi)
- Turns: 10
- Race lap record: 0:56.920 ( (United States) Willy T. Ribbs, Toyota Celica Turbo, 1987, IMSA GTO)

Firebird Lake
- Length: 3.9 km (2.4 mi)

Radford Racing Course
- Surface: Asphalt
- Length: 2.6 km (1.6 mi)
- Turns: 15

West Course
- Surface: Asphalt
- Length: 1.8 km (1.1 mi)

Off-Road Course
- Surface: Dirt
- Length: 1.13 km (0.70 mi)

Drag Strip
- Surface: Concrete
- Length: 0.402 km (0.250 mi)

Firebird Motorsports Park (formerly Wild Horse Pass Motorsports Park and Firebird International Raceway) is a 450-acre (180 ha) motorsport racing complex, located in Chandler, Arizona, United States, about 18 mi (29 km) southeast of downtown Phoenix.

== History ==
The facility opened as Firebird International Raceway in 1983.

In 1985, Firebird hosted the NHRA Fallnationals, the first National NHRA event held at the complex. Gene Snow would win the Top Fuel championship while Bob Glidden clinched the 1985 NHRA world championship.

On May 17, 1987, it held its only IMSA GT race, the Arizona 300.

In December 1992, Three-time Formula One Champion Ayrton Senna tested an IndyCar on the East Course with Team Penske. Senna was intrigued, but eventually decided to stay in Formula One.

In March 2013, it was announced that the land owner, the Gila River Indian Community and the operator of Firebird International Raceway, Charlie Allen could not reach an agreement on a lease extension and that the complex would close in April. The complex would stay closed throughout March until the Gila River Indian Community announced that they signed a lease agreement with a new operator in June, the complex would change names from Firebird International Raceway to Wild Horse Pass Motorsports Park, named after the neighboring tribal casino and resort Wild Horse Pass while also receiving an investment of more than $1 million in renovations, including repaving the drag-strip.

On Feb 22, 2014, Wild Horse Pass Motorsports Park would reopen and host its first event since closing, the NHRA Arizona National.

In March 2022, it was announced that Wild Horse Pass Motorsports Park would close in February 2023, after NHRA Arizona Nationals, due to the widening of Interstate 10. Radford Racing School and the Radford Racing course will remain open after Wild Horse Pass Motorsports Park closes.

Track officials announced that the track would change the name of the facility to Firebird Motorsports Park which is a reference to the original name of the facility.

== Track records ==
=== Race lap records ===
The fastest official race lap records at the Firebird Motorsports Park are listed as:

Category	Time	Driver	Vehicle	Event
East Course (1983–present): 1.250 mi (2.012 km)
IMSA GTO	0:56.920	Willy T. Ribbs	Toyota Celica Turbo	1987 Arizona 300
IMSA GTU	1:01.290	Lee Mueller	Nissan 300ZX	1987 Arizona 300
Trans-Am	1:02.190	Willy T. Ribbs	Mercury Capri	1985 Firebird Trans-Am round

=== Drag strip records ===
Category	E.T.	Speed	Driver	Event	Ref
Top Fuel	3.643		Brittany Force	2020 NHRA Arizona Nationals	
Top Fuel		337.92 mph (543.83 km/h)	Brittany Force	2020 NHRA Arizona Nationals	
Funny Car	3.823		Matt Hagan	2022 NHRA Arizona Nationals	
Funny Car		337.16 mph (542.61 km/h)	Courtney Force	2018 NHRA Arizona Nationals	
Pro Stock	6.498		Mike Edwards	2013 NHRA Arizona Nationals	
Pro Stock		213.77 mph (344.03 km/h)	Mike Edwards	2013 NHRA Arizona Nationals	

== Layout configurations ==
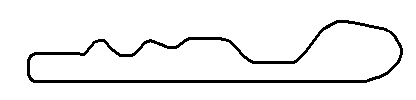
Main Course

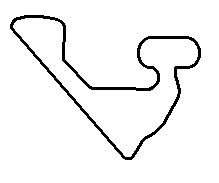
West Course

East Course

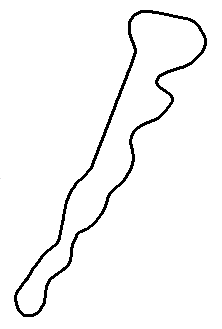
Radford Racing Course

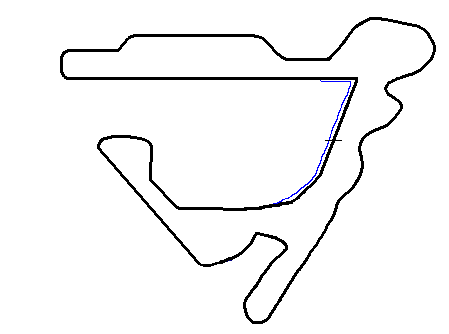
West, Radford Racing and Main Courses combined

== NHRA Mission Foods Drag Racing Series Winners ==
Year	Top Fuel	Funny Car	Pro Stock
1985	Gene Snow	John Collins	Bob Glidden
1986	Dick Lahaie	Kenny Bernstein	Bob Glidden
1987	Dick Lahaie	Mark Oswald	Bob Glidden
1988	Eddie Hill	Mike Dunn	Bob Glidden
1989	Shirley Muldowney	Bruce Larson	Darrell Alderman
1990	Joe Amato	Dale Pulde	Bob Glidden
1991	Kenny Bernstein	Jim White	Darrell Alderman
1992	Pat Austin	Tom Hoover	Jerry Eckman
1993	Eddie Hill	Cruz Pedregon	Mark Pawak
1994	Cory McClenathan	John Force	Scott Geoffrion
1995	Larry Dixon Jr.	John Force	Darrell Alderman
1996	Kenny Bernstein	John Force	Jim Yates
1997	Gary Scelzi	John Force	Jim Yates
1998	Cory McClenathan	Chuck Etchells	Warren Johnson
1999	Joe Amato	John Force	Kurt Johnson
2000	Tony Schumacher	John Force	Jeg Couglin Jr.
2001	Doug Kalitta	John Force	Warren Johnson
2002	Tony Schumacher	Del Worsham	Bruce Allen
2003	Brandon Bernstein	Ron Capps	Greg Anderson
2004	Brandon Bernstein	Del Worsham	Kurt Johnson
2005	Tony Schumacher	John Force	Allen Johnson
2006	Rod Fuller	Tommy Johnson Jr.	Warren Johnson
2007	Rod Fuller	Tony Pedregon	Kurt Johnson
2008	Larry Dixon Jr.	Jack Beckman	Vieri Gaines
2009	Antron Brown	Ron Capps	Jeg Coughlin Jr.
2010	Cory McClenathan	Jack Beckman	Mike Edwards
2011	Del Worsham	Mike Neff	Jason Line
2012	Antron Brown	Robert Hight	Jason Line
2013	Tony Schumacher	Ron Capps	Erica Enders
2014	Antron Brown	Alexis DeJoria	Allen Johnson
2015	Tony Schumacher	Matt Hagan	Rodger Brogden
2016	Leah Pruett	Tim Wilkerson	Jason Line
2017	Leah Pruett	Matt Hagan	Greg Anderson
2018	Steve Torrence	Courtney Force	Chris McGaha
2019	Billy Torrence	Matt Hagan	Jeg Coughlin Jr.
2020	Steve Torrence	Tommy Johnson Jr.	Erica Enders
2021	No event held.		
2022	Mike Salinas	Robert Hight	Aaron Stanfield
2023	Justin Ashley	Robert Hight	Camrie Caruso
2024	Shawn Langdon	Austin Prock	Greg Anderson
2025	Shawn Langdon	Paul Lee	Greg Anderson
2026	Shawn Langdon	Ron Capps	Dallas Glenn
