= GMC Stadium (Calgary) =

Stadium in Alberta, Canada

Coordinates: 51°2′0″N 114°3′11″W

- Interactive map of GMC Stadium

Construction
- Opened: 1974
- Architects: Howard V. Lobb & Partners

GMC Stadium is a 17,000-seat, plus 8,000 more with standing room, stadium in Calgary, Alberta, Canada. It annually hosts the rodeo, the chuckwagon races and the evening grandstand show portions of the Calgary Stampede.

Thoroughbred racing on the half-mile track here ended in 2008, making the annual chuckwagon races during Stampede Week the only event that now uses the track.

In June 2022, the Stampede Grandstand was renamed GMC Stadium.

In a Calgary Stampede master plan unveiled in 2026, it was announced that GMC Stadium would be expanded. Joel Cowley, president and CEO of the Calgary Stampede, noted that there may be an opportunity for the stadium to become the new home field for the Calgary Stampeders, replacing McMahon Stadium.
