= Nitrocross =

Rallycross series

- Category: Rallycross
- Country: International
- Inaugural season: 2021
- Folded: 2024
- Classes: Group E NEXT; SxS
- Manufacturers: OMSE; Can-Am; Volkswagen
- Tire suppliers: Yokohama
- Last Drivers' champion: (Sweden) Robin Larsson
- Last Teams' champion: Dreyer & Reinbold Racing JC
- Official website: www.nitrocrossracing.com

Nitrocross was an American rallycross racing series. Created by rallycross driver Travis Pastrana and the Nitro Circus production in 2018, it became a full series in 2021 and folded in 2024. The championship was sanctioned by the United States Auto Club.

== History ==
From 2018 to 2019, rallycross was a sport in the Nitro World Games at Utah Motorsports Campus. In late 2020, it expanded into its own series with plans of running the inaugural season in 2021 and debuting an electric class in 2022.

Although American rallycross leagues like the Global Rallycross Championship and Americas Rallycross Championship had failed, Nitrocross founder Pastrana envisioned the series as an inexpensive discipline that did not need to rely on heavy manufacturer support.

Nitrocross cars raced with exclusively internal combustion engines in 2021 while the electric Group E class was introduced in 2022. Group E's electric vehicles are built using a battery-powered SUV platform called the FC1-X, which is developed by First Corner – a joint venture between QEV Technologies and Olsbergs MSE, the project received manufacturer support such as Ford, Subaru, and Volkswagen. The FC1-X began testing in February 2021 and made its racing debut at the 2022 Race of Champions.

Ahead of the 2023–24 season, the series was renamed from Nitro Rallycross to Nitrocross to reflect its deviation from the traditional rallycross format.

The series was discontinued in October 2024, after two rounds of the 2024–25 season. The FC1-X cars were eventually acquired by the upstart RallyX Americas.

== Tracks ==
Nitrocross tracks were purpose built, with mixed surfaces and jumps. Speaking with DirtFish in March 2020, Pastrana stressed the construction of such courses with an emphasis on dirt, high-banked corners, and large jumps, comparing his plans to motocross courses as "every track was unique." As part of the series' development, Pastrana built a test circuit near his house. The series also raced on short course dirt tracks used previously in the Lucas Oil Off Road Racing Series such as Wild Horse Pass Motorsports Park in Arizona.

For the second season in 2022–23, the series expanded to include races in Canada, Sweden, and Lydden Hill Race Circuit in England.

== Race format ==
Race weekends featured the main Supercar class, the NEXT developmental division, and the electric Group E class. While the Supercars had one race per weekend, NEXT ran two. Each weekend was split into two days, with the first consisting of qualifying, while races took place on the second.

After single-lap qualifying is conducted, drivers were paired up into a bracket tournament called battles, with the winner of each battle receiving a point in the championship. The winner of the bracket was rewarded with pole position for the next day's races.

The second day featured a series of qualifying races to reach the final, with the top two in each race advancing. The first pair of heat races had eight cars and last five laps apiece, and those remaining were placed into two semi-final races. Drivers who failed to qualify for the final via the heats and semi-finals entered a Last Chance Qualifier. The final consisted of ten cars and points were allocated in five-point intervals beginning with 50 for the winner.

1st / 2nd / 3rd / 4th / 5th / 6th / 7th / 8th / 9th / 10th; 50 / 45 / 40 / 35 / 30 / 25 / 20 / 15 / 10 / 5	Bonuses: Battle winner / 1

== Champions ==
Year	Driver	Team	Car
Nitro World Games
2018	Timmy Hansen (SWE)	Team Peugeot-Hansen	Peugeot 208 T16
2019	Kevin Hansen (SWE)	Team Peugeot-Hansen	Peugeot 208 T16
2020	Canceled		
Nitro Rallycross Championship
2021	Travis Pastrana (USA)	Subaru Motorsports USA	Subaru WRX STi
2022–23	Robin Larsson (SWE)	Dreyer & Reinbold Racing JC	FC1-X
Nitrocross Championship
2023–24	Robin Larsson (SWE)	Dreyer & Reinbold Racing JC	FC1-X
2024–25	Canceled		
