= Molly Taylor =

Australian rally driver (born 1988)

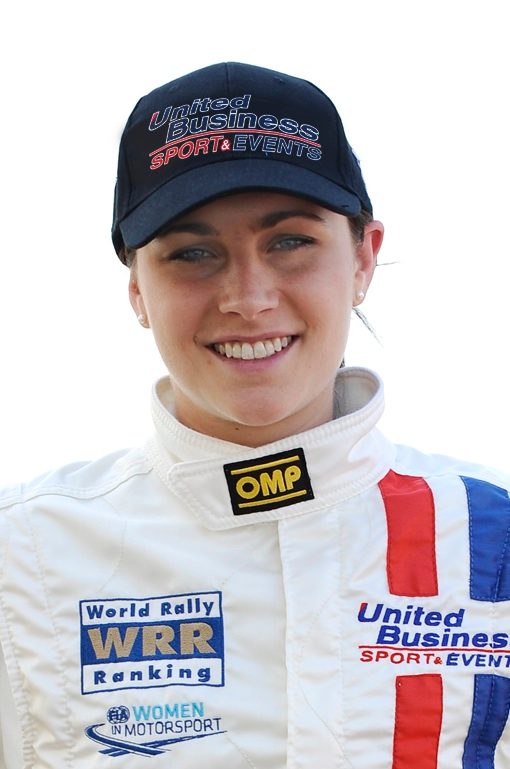
- Taylor in 2013
- Born: 6 May 1988 (age 38); Sydney, New South Wales, Australia
- Education: University of Sydney
- Occupation: Rally driver
- Years active: 2010–present
- Parent(s): Mark Taylor; Coral Taylor

Extreme E career
- Debut season: 2021
- Current team: Veloce Racing
- Car number: 22
- Former teams: Rosberg X Racing
- Starts: 26
- Championships: 2
- Wins: 8
- Best finish: 1st in 2021, 2024
- Finished last season: 1st

Previous series
- 2007–2009; 2015–2018 2009–present 2013 2013–present: Australian Rally Championship; British Rally Championship; European Rally Championship; World Rally Championship

Championship titles
- 2025 2021, 2024 2016 2007, 2008 2009, 2010: Extreme H Extreme E Australian Rally Champion; Australian Rally F16 Champion; British Ladies Rally Champion
- Statistics up to date as of April 02, 2024.
- Website: http://www.mollytaylor.com.au/

Molly Anne Taylor (born 6 May 1988) is an Australian rally car driver. She is the 2016 Australian Rally Champion, the first and only woman to win the Australian Rally Championship and the youngest regardless of gender, and the 2021 Extreme E Champion.

Taylor was the first female accepted into the Australian Motor Sports Foundation (AMSF) International Rising Star Program and also awarded the New South Wales (NSW) Confederation of Australian Motorsport Young Achiever of the Year Award in 2006. In 2011, she was part of the World Rally Championship Pirelli Star Driver program and one of the youngest and the only female driver participating in the WRC. She has won several championships including back to back Australian Rally Championships in the F16 Class for 2007 and 2008. In 2009, she became the British Ladies Rally Champion, the first ever driver from outside of the United Kingdom to win the title, which she won again in 2010. She also competed in the FIA 2013 European Rally Championship. In 2016, Taylor won the Australian Rally Championship overall classification.

== Early life and education ==
Taylor is the daughter of rally driver Mark Taylor and four-time Australian Rally Champion co-driver Coral Taylor. Molly has one sister, Jane. Molly attended New England Girls' School in Northern New South Wales. She had a love of horses growing up and competed in cross-country events. While attending school, her focus was on equestrian events where she competed in national level events. Taylor sold her horse in order to purchase her first rally car. She was quoted as saying, "I got 100 horsepower for one horse so I thought that was pretty good."

After attaining a Universities Admissions Index of 98/100, Taylor commenced a Bachelor of Commerce at the University of Sydney. She left university to pursue rallying full time. She also has a Certificate in Automotive Studies and is a qualified personal trainer.

== Career ==
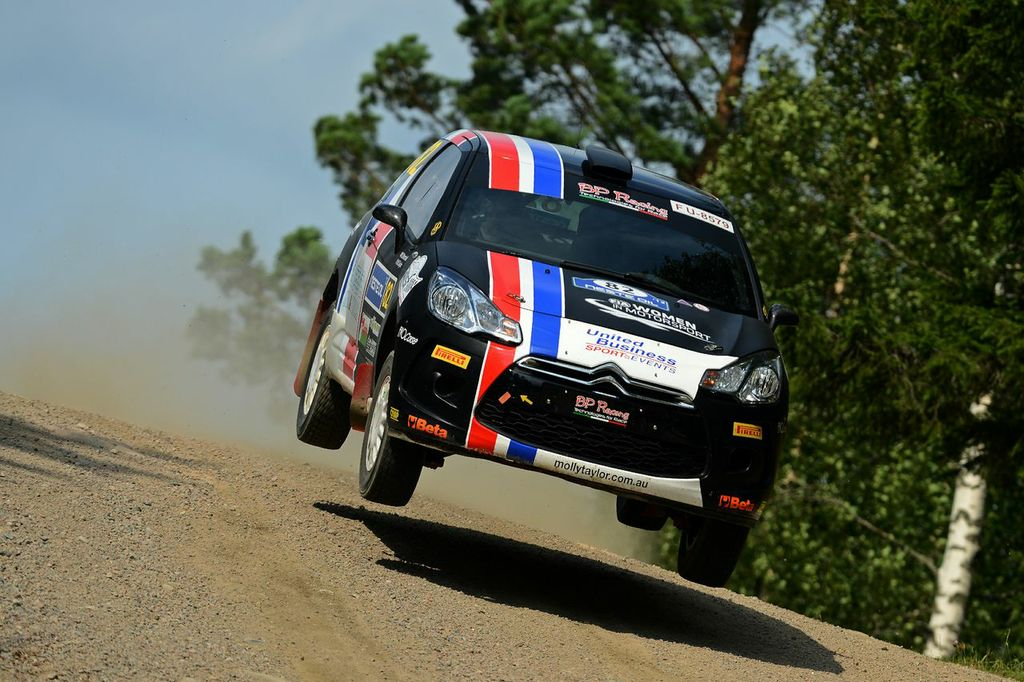
Driving Citroën DS3 R3T for United Business in WRC Rally Finland.

=== Early career pre-2010 ===
While working with her father at his rally school, Taylor was offered a car to compete in some local motorkhanas where she took first in class and placed ninth outright. It was during her time at the rally school with her father teaching her to be a safe driver that she decided to pursue a career in rallying.

In 2006, Taylor was selected into the Women's Driver Development program where she was considered a standout performer. The same year she upgraded from a Holden Gemini and won her first outing in her new car by a full five minutes. She was recognized as the New South Wales Young Achiever of the year by CAMS after winning the 2006 New South Wales Rally Championship, taking both the 2WD and 2-Litre titles. She used 2006 as a year to gain experience in a rear-wheel drive rally car before moving into a front-wheel drive car and moving up to the Australian Rally Championship.

Taylor debuted in the Australian Rally Championship in 2007 where she won the F16 class, a feat she repeated in 2008. She moved to the United Kingdom a year later in order to compete in the Suzuki Swift Sport Cup, where she won three out of her six races and became the British Ladies Rally Champion. In 2009 and 2010, she was selected for the Australian Motor Sport Foundation International Rising Star program.

=== 2010–2016 ===
While driving in the British Rally Championship, she was noticed by Pirelli and World Racing Championship Academy officials. She was then invited to participate in the Pirelli Star Driver Shootout where she competed against sixteen of the top young drivers in rally racing from throughout the world. Based on her performance at the Shootout, she was awarded one of only six scholarships to the FIA World Rally Championship Academy, which allowed her to compete in the World Rally Championship in 2011. The scholarship allowed her to participate in six events for the World Rally Championship with all of her racing expenses paid. She finished the final race of the championship at the Wales Rally Great Britain with a stage win, also winning the Richard Burns Trophy for the season.

Taylor also competed in the FIA European Championship in 2013. She also competed for the first ever FIA European Rally Championship ladies trophy.

In 2015, Taylor became the first woman to win a heat in the Australian Rally Championship in heat one of the opening event in Western Australia, and then the first woman to win an event outright at the National Capital Rally in Canberra. Molly achieved podium positions at every Championship round and finished second overall in the Championship. She was also invited to take part in a 1000 km Endurance Race in Lithuania where her team finished third in their class.

Taylor was awarded the Peter Brock Medal, one of the most prestigious awards in Australian motorsport, awarded to the driver who has demonstrated similar characteristics to the late Peter Brock AM, including outstanding ability, a fair and sportsman-like attitude and a willingness and capacity to promote the sport in the wider community.

In 2016, Taylor became both the first female driver to win the Australian Rally Championship and the youngest to do so at the time, with co-driver Bill Hayes.

=== 2017–2019 ===
A strong start to the 2017 season and consistent performance throughout the year put Taylor in a strong position for a consecutive back-to-back victory, but an engine failure during the final round in Coffs Harbour pushed Taylor and new co-driver Malcolm Read to second overall, handing the outright win to Nathan Quinn.

It was another crushing finish to the year for Taylor in 2018 when, once again, her Coffs Harbour weekend was brought to an early conclusion following a spectacular crash during the second stage. Taylor and Read escaped unharmed despite a significant impact that caused their Les Walkden Subaru WRX STI to catch fire.

For the 2019 season, Taylor and Read entered the ARC with an all-new AP4 WRX STI built and supported by Orange Motorsport Engineering. It was to be a challenging year with persistent mechanical problems and a serious crash in Ballarat punctuated by successes but, once again, the season would conclude under unusual circumstances. The penultimate Adelaide Hills round – and subsequently the 2018 season – was won by championship favourite Harry Bates, finishing day two and more than 97 kilometres ahead of Taylor by just two tenths of a second. Bates secured the overall victory on points for the Neal Bates Motorsport Toyota team at the penultimate round, ahead of the final round in Coffs Harbour. The Subaru do Motorsport team finished third overall for the season.

However, the 2019 Australian bushfire crisis lead to the cancellation of the Coffs Harbour round and an early finish for the 2019 tour. It was the final year in Subaru Australia's contract with Taylor and a four-year commitment to the ARC, and the carmaker did not return for the 2020 championship.

In 2019, Taylor also made her series circuit racing debut, competing in the TCR Australia championship. As part of the Kelly Racing TCR team, Taylor raced one of two Subaru WRX TCR cars entered into the championship but ARC commitments meant she was only able to compete in five of the season's seven races.

=== 2019–present ===
Following Subaru's exit from the Australian Rally Championship, Taylor had planned to compete in a number of rounds of the 2020 American Rally Association championship in a DirtFish Limited Subaru WRX STI, but the impact of the COVID-19 pandemic put an hiatus on her ARA assault. Taylor continues as a brand ambassador for Subaru Australia.

In 2020, it was announced Taylor would be participating the Seven Network's reality program SAS Australia.

In May 2020, Taylor joined the driver program of the inaugural Extreme E international electric rally series, which commenced in 2021. She partners Johan Kristoffersson at the Rosberg X Racing team. The pair won three of the five rounds of the season on their way to becoming the series' first champions. Despite winning the championship, she was replaced by Mikaela Åhlin-Kottulinsky for the 2022 season. Taylor joined JBXE for the 2022 Desert X-Prix, sharing the car with Kevin Hansen on a one-race deal.

In October 2025, Taylor survived a rollover crash on a desert track in Saudi Arabia. She climbed out of the damaged car by herself and was taken to hospital, just to be sure she had no severe injuries. Her team was hoping to repair the car in time for the race on the next day.

== Career rally record ==
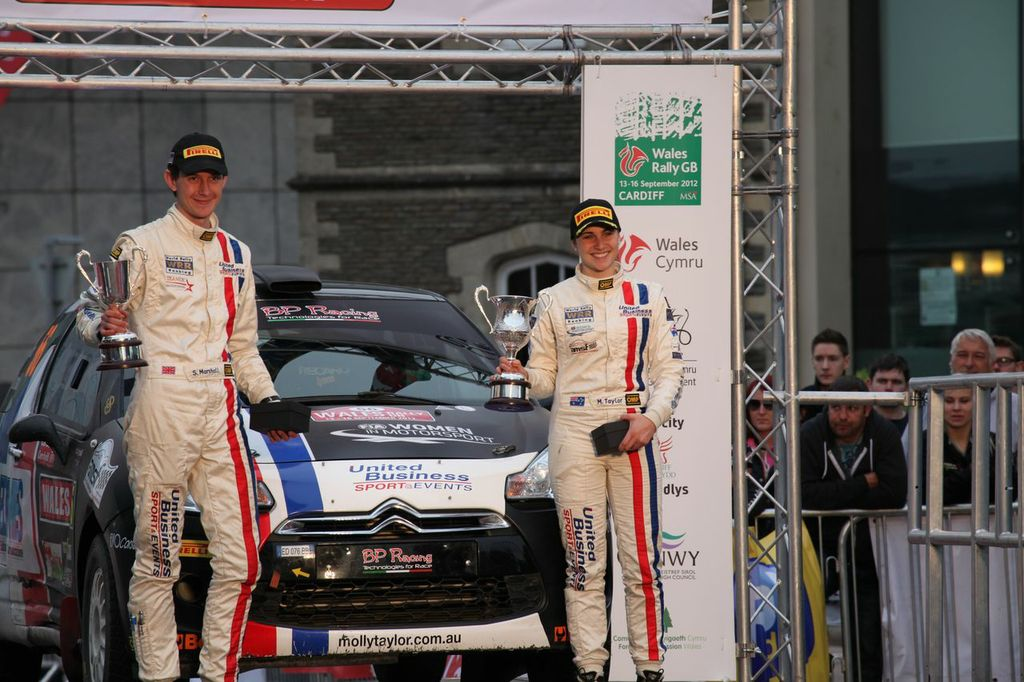
Richard Burns Trophy, Wales Rally GB

- 2025 – Extreme H World Cup - Winner
- 2024 – Extreme E – overall champion
- 2023 – Extreme E – third overall
- 2021 – Extreme E – overall champion
- 2017 – Australian Rally Championship – runner up
- 2016 – Australian Rally Championship – overall champion
- 2016 – Twilight Rallysprint Series – 37th in Round 1
- 2015 – Australian Rally Championship – runner up
- 2015 – Awarded Peter Brock Medal
- 2013 – FIA European Rally Championship - Ladies Champion
- 2012 – Signed With United Business Rally Management, Selected World & European Rally Championship Events
- 2011 – Pirelli Star Driver
- 2011 – World Rally Championship Academy
- 2010 – British Ladies Rally Champion
- 2010 – 3rd Citroën Racing Trophy (BRC)
- 2010 – IRDC Most Improved Award
- 2009 – British Ladies Rally Champion
- 2009 – Greenlight TV Star Performer Award
- 2008 – F16 Champion, Australian Rally Championship
- 2007 – F16 Champion, Australian Rally Championship
- 2006 – 2WD Champion, NSW Rally Championship
- 2006 – 2 Litre Champion, NSW Rally Championship

=== Complete World Rally Championship results ===
Year	Entrant	Car	1	2	3	4	5	6	7	8	9	10	11	12	13	14	WDC	Points
2011	Molly Taylor	Ford Fiesta R2	SWE	MEX	POR; NC	JOR	ITA; Ret	ARG	GRE	FIN; NC	GER; NC	AUS	FRA; NC	ESP	GBR; NC		NC	0
2012	Molly Taylor	Citroën DS3 R3T	MON	SWE	MEX	POR	ARG	GRE	NZL	FIN; Ret	GER	GBR; 20	FRA	ITA	ESP		NC	0
2013	Molly Taylor	Citroën DS3 R3T	MON	SWE	MEX	POR	ARG	GRE	ITA	FIN	GER	AUS	FRA	ESP	GBR; 23		NC	0
2014	Molly Taylor	Citroën DS3 R3T	MON	SWE	MEX	POR; 37	ARG	ITA	POL; 45	FIN; 35	GER	AUS	FRA	ESP	GBR; 32		NC	0
2016	Les Walkden Racing	Subaru WRX STI	MON	SWE	MEX	ARG	POR	ITA	POL	FIN	GER	CHN; C	FRA	ESP	GBR	AUS; 13	NC	0
2021	M-Sport Poland	Ford Fiesta Rally3	MON	ARC	CRO	POR	ITA	KEN	EST; Ret	BEL	GRE; Ret	FIN; 20	ESP	MNZ			NC	0

^{*} Season still in progress.

=== Complete Extreme E results ===
(key)

Year	Team	Car	1	2	3	4	5	6	7	8	9	10	Pos.	Points
2021	Rosberg X Racing	Spark ODYSSEY 21	DES; Q 3	DES; R 1	OCE; Q 2	OCE; R 1	ARC; Q 3	ARC; R 5	ISL; Q 2	ISL; R 1	JUR; Q 2	JUR; R 4	1st	133
2022	JBXE	Spark ODYSSEY 21	DES; 9	ISL1	ISL2	COP							14th	12
2022	Veloce Racing	Spark ODYSSEY 21					ENE; 5						14th	12
2023	Veloce Racing	Spark ODYSSEY 21	DES; 1; 1	DES; 2; 2	HYD; 1; 7	HYD; 2; 1	ISL1; 1; 6	ISL1; 2; 7	ISL2; 1; 3	ISL2; 2; 6	COP; 1; 5	COP; 2; 1	3rd	138
2024	E.ON Next Veloce Racing	Spark ODYSSEY 21	DES; 1; 3	DES; 2; 3	HYD; 1; 1	HYD; 2; 1	ISL1; 1 C	ISL1; 2 C	ISL2; 1 C	ISL2; 2 C	VAL; 1 C	VAL; 2 C	1st ^{†}	83 ^{†}
2025	Jameel Motorsport	Spark ODYSSEY 21	DES; 1 WD	DES; 2; 2									N/A	N/A

^{†} Season abandoned.

== Career circuit racing record ==
=== Complete Bathurst 12 Hour results ===
Year	Team	Co-drivers	Car	Class	Laps	Overall position	Class position
2009	(Australia) Jim Hunter Motorsport	(New Zealand) Heather Spurle (New Zealand) Christina Orr	Subaru Impreza 2.0R	G	203	27th	2nd

=== TCR Australia results ===
TCR Australia results
Year	Team	Car	1	2	3	4	5	6	7	8	9	10	11	12	13	14	15	16	17	18	19	20	21	Position	Points
2019	Kelly Racing	Subaru WRX STI TCR	SMP; R1; 14	SMP; R2; 15	SMP; R3; 12	PHI; R4; Ret	PHI; R5; 11	PHI; R6; 13	BEN; R7; 15	BEN; R8; Ret	BEN; R9; DNS	QLD; R10; 14	QLD; R11; 15	QLD; R12; Ret	WIN; R13; 11	WIN; R14; Ret	WIN; R15; Ret	SAN; R16	SAN; R17	SAN; R18	BEN; R19	BEN; R20	BEN; R21	19th	116

== See also ==
- 2008 Australian Rally Championship
- List of female World Rally Championship drivers

Sporting positions
Preceded by Eli Evans	Australian Rally Championship - Champion; 2016	Succeeded by Nathan Quinn
Preceded by First title	Extreme E Champion; 2021; With: Johan Kristoffersson	Succeeded by Cristina Gutiérrez; Sébastien Loeb
Preceded by Mikaela Åhlin-Kottulinsky; Johan Kristoffersson	Extreme E Champion; 2024; With: Kevin Hansen	Succeeded by Incumbent
Preceded by First title	Extreme H World Cup Champion; 2025; With: Kevin Hansen	Succeeded by Incumbent
Awards and achievements
Preceded by Jim Richards	Peter Brock Medal; 2015	Succeeded by Mark Webber
