= Grace's Amazing Machines =

British children's television series about vehicles and machines

- Also known as: Catie's Amazing Machines
- Presented by: Grace Webb
- Music by: The Darkness
- Country of origin: United Kingdom

Production
- Production companies: BBC Children's Productions; BBC Studios Kids & Family

Original release
- Network: CBeebies
- Release: October 2018 – present

Grace's Amazing Machines (known as Catie's Amazing Machines and presented by Catie Munnings for the first series) is a television series first shown on CBeebies on 8 October 2018. The show's second series premiered on 21 October 2019; Munnings left the series to focus more on her rally racing career after receiving sponsorship from Red Bull, and was replaced by Grace Webb. With this, the series was renamed to Grace's Amazing Machines.

Presenter Grace Webb explains the role and basic mechanics of large and/or fast vehicles, usually ending up in the driving seat for a demonstration. The format is similar for each episode; Munnings/Webb summons Speedie, a remote controlled car, to deliver an envelope revealing the theme of the episode. Three machines are featured, from which she chooses her favourite. Vox pops are used for children to share their thoughts on the vehiclesThe Darkness provides the soundtrack for the show.
