= Catie Munnings =

British rally driver

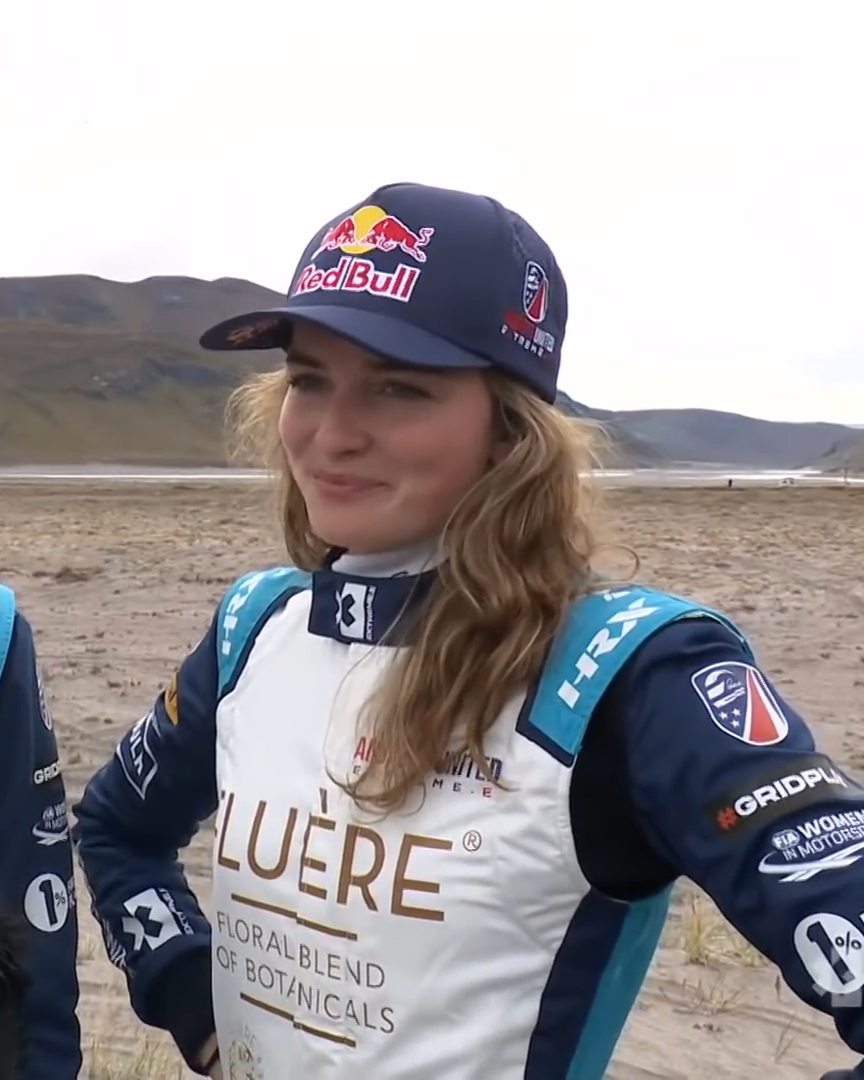
- Munnings in 2021

Personal information
- Nationality: (United Kingdom) British
- Born: 15 November 1997 (age 29); Great Britain

World Rally Championship record
- Co-driver: Ida Lidebjer-Granberg
- Rallies: 1
- Championships: 0
- Rally wins: 0
- Podiums: 0
- Stage wins: 0
- Total points: 0
- First rally: 2020 Rally Sweden
- Last rally: 2020 Rally Sweden

European Rally Championship Ladies' Trophy
- Years active: 2016–2019
- Co-driver: Anne Katharina Stein (to 2018); Alba Sánchez (Cyprus & Barum 2018); Veronica Engan (from 2019)
- Former teams: Saintéloc Junior Team
- Starts: 7
- Championships: 0
- Wins: 2
- Podiums: 5

Championship titles
- 2016: FIA European Rally Championship Ladies' Trophy

Catherine Elizabeth Munnings (born 15 November 1997) is a British rally driver. The daughter of former rally driver Chris Munnings, she currently competes in the electric off-road racing series, Extreme E, for Andretti Altawkilat XE. She has previously raced in the European Rally Championship, winning the championship's Ladies' Trophy in 2016. She also presented Catie's Amazing Machines on the BBC television channel CBeebies.

== Biography ==
=== Childhood and personal life ===
Munnings was born on 15 November 1997. She is the daughter of the rally driver and instructor Chris Munnings and his wife Tracey. From the age of seven Munnings was educated at the all-girls school Kent College, Pembury, and took three A level examinations. She acted as deputy head girl, an academic, and a performing arts and music scholar. Munning grew up riding quads and old cars around her parents' farm. At the age of 17, she began driving on the test track with Peugeot. Munnings competed in national athletics tournaments and was talent-spotted as a dancer. She combined her academic studies with her rally career, and declined a place at university. Munnings works with former racing driver Susie Wolff on her Dare to be Different campaign which encourages more girls to take up a career in motor racing, and the IAM RoadSmart charity. She has named the 1982 World Rally Championship runner-up Michèle Mouton as the person she idolises the most. Munnings currently lives with her family at their farm in Headcorn in Kent. When not competing in rally, she works at her parents' corporate events company.

=== Racing career ===
Munnings, whose original ambition was to become a vet, had her interests geared towards rallying from a young age by regularly visiting her father's workplace. She was able to execute a perfect handbrake turn by thirteen and provided driving lessons to her friends on a specially constructed circuit built by her father on the family farm. To qualify for an international licence which allowed her to partake in the European Rally Championship (ERC), Munnings entered six club rally events held in Wales and Norfolk. Her father acted as instructor and co-driver. Munnings received media training from Eurosport and was coached by former rally driver Urmo Aava.

Munnings made her ERC début at the Ypres Rally behind the wheel of a Peugeot 208 VTi R2 for Saintéloc Junior Team. It was at this rally that she began her partnership with the lawyer Anne Stein who was her co-driver. Munnings got one of her wheels on sodden grass and barrel rolled her car which damaged an electricity pylon. She finished 65th out of 67 drivers overall and was the only woman to complete the rally. Munnings's second (and final) rally of the 2016 season in Liepāja saw her again score points by reaching the end of the event. She had accumulated enough points to win the FIA European Rally Championship Ladies' Trophy. In late 2016, Munnings was one of four athletes shortlisted for the Sunday Times Young Sportswoman of the Year. At the awards ceremony on 8 December, she lost the award to swimmer Siobhan-Marie O'Connor.

Named a 2017 Peugeot UK Brand ambassador, Women of the Future, Sean Edwards Foundation Ambassador and IAM Roadsmart car ambassador, Munnings remained with Saintéloc for the 2017 season, but as part of the Peugeot Rally Academy where she was partnered with José Antonio Suárez and Pepe López. Munnings said before the new season that she wanted to put into practice the things she had learned from the previous year. Her first competitive run of the year came at the Rallye Açores where she retired on the fifth stage because of an accident. After securing a 68th overall finish in the 2017 Rally Islas Canarias, Munnings retired in the next rally she entered in, 2017 Rajd Rzeszowski, due to an accident.

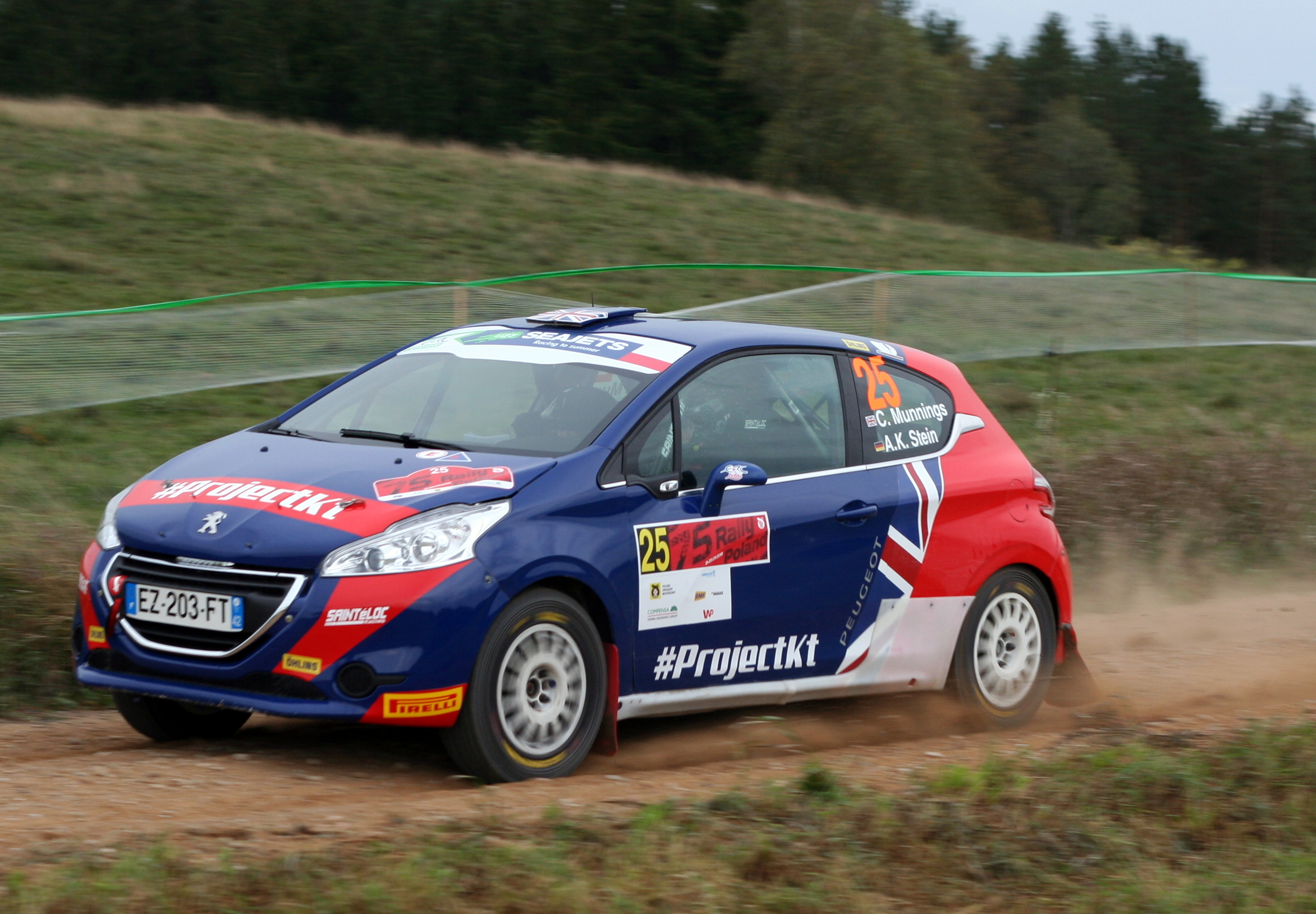
Catie Munnings at the 2018 Rally Poland.

Munnings' fourth event of the season in the 2017 Barum Rally Zlín saw her take stage class victories in spite of changing a broken wheel earlier on because of understeering on a narrow low-speed corner and hitting a kerb. Munnings's participation in the Rally di Roma Capitale was in doubt because of budget problems, but she confirmed her entry shortly before the event started. She took wins in the city stages and night stages in the Ladies' Trophy rankings but the tricky conditions led her to slip off the road and get stuck in the ditch for ten minutes, leaving her in second position in the Ladies' Trophy rankings. Munnings placed second in the Ladies' Trophy championship overall and ranked 14th in the Junior Under 27 standings.

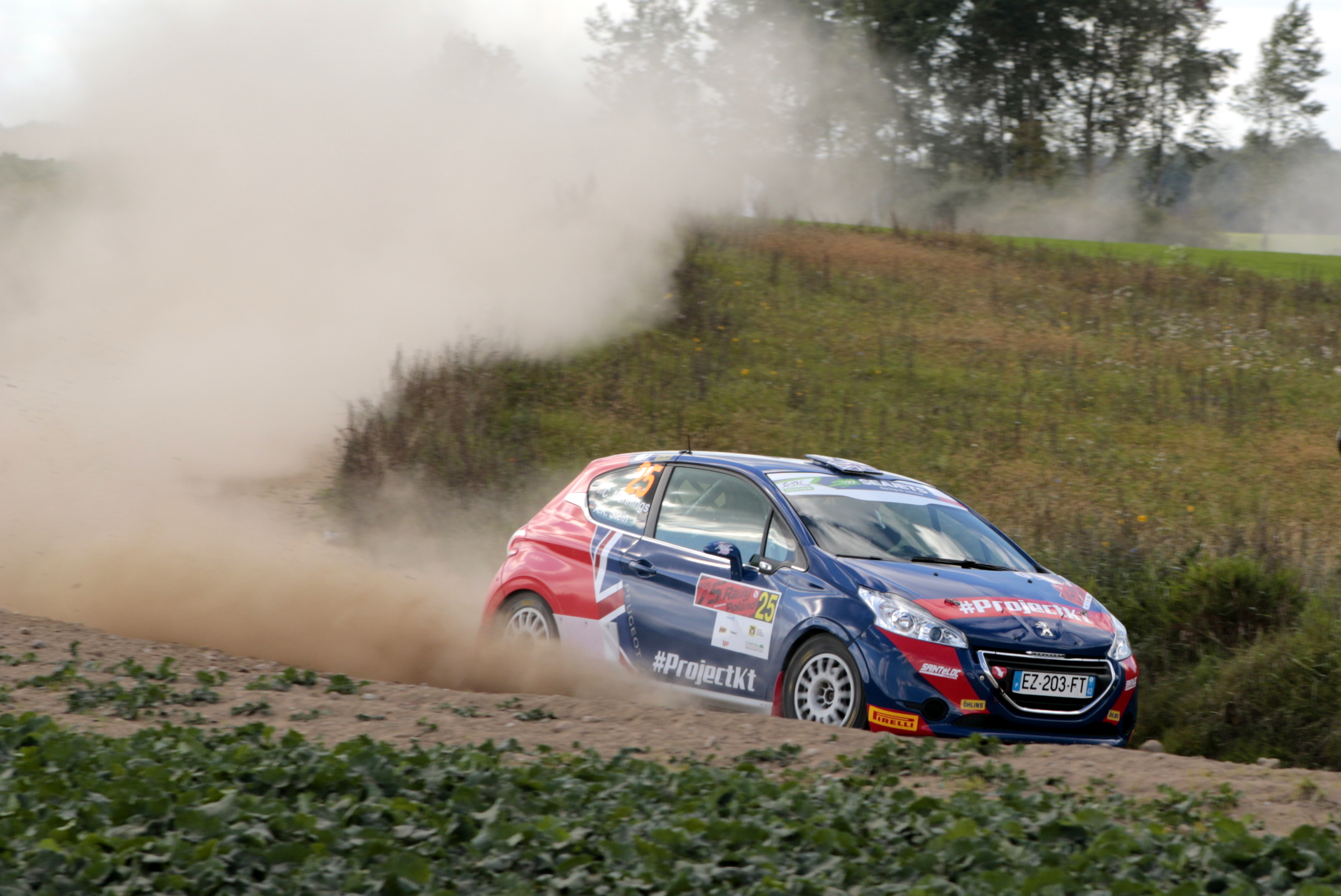
Catie Munnings at the 2018 Rally Poland.

For the 2018 season, Munnings returned to compete for Saintéloc Junior Team in the Junior Under 27 Championship for the second year in a row and also contested for the Ladies' Trophy. Munnings began the season by coming second in the Ladies' Trophy and fifth in the Under 27 standings at the Rallye Azores. She had a total of four victories in the Ladies' Trophy, which she took in the season's final four rounds to place second in that championship. Her results caused her to finish eighth in the Junior Under 27 Championship with four fifth-place finishes.

In the 2019 championship, Munnings continued to compete in the ERC3 category, with her new co-driver Veronica Engan. Munnings received backing from the energy drinks company Red Bull UK for the upcoming season. She was the winner of the ERC Ladies' category at Rally Liepāja 2019.

In February 2020, Munnings drove a specially prepared Bentley Continental in the GP Ice Race at Zell am See in Austria which culminated by teaming up with skier Sven Rauber for a demonstration of skijoring, where a skier is towed, at speed, behind a car.

In 2021, Munnings competed in the new all-electric off-road racing championship Extreme E for Andretti United alongside teammate Timmy Hansen. In qualifying for the inaugural Desert X-Prix, she took over from Hansen with a right-rear puncture, but was able to bring the car home in fourth place on three wheels. They then went on to finish 2nd in the final race, behind Rosberg X Racing. The two continued with Andretti for all four seasons of Extreme E—the only pairing to do so—and combined for nine podiums and one win, achieved at the 2021 Arctic X-Prix in Kangerlussuaq, Greenland.

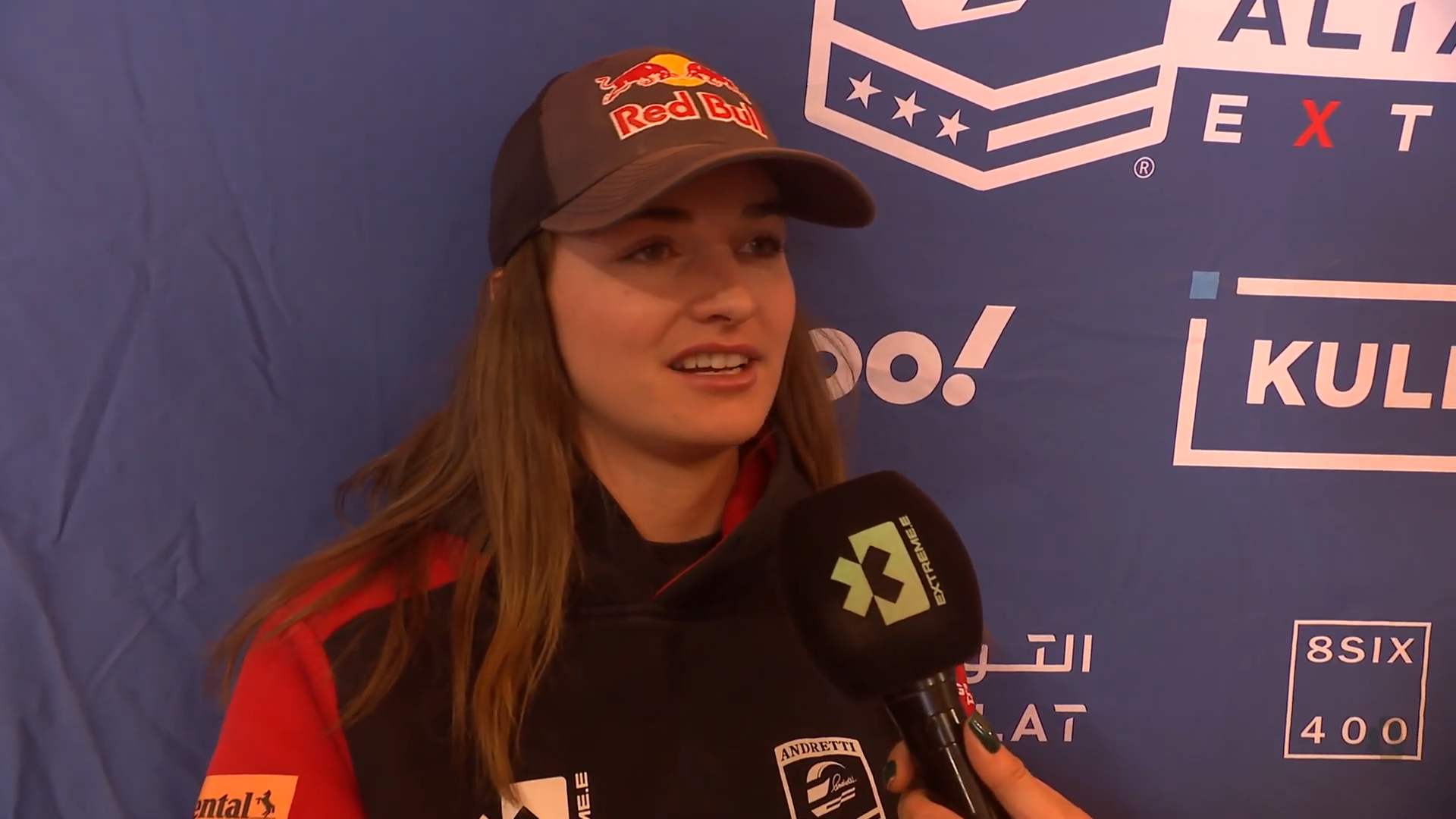
Catie Munnings during the 2023 Extreme E round in Chile

As Extreme E transitioned into hydrogen-based Extreme H, Munnings conducted the first public outing of the new car, the Pioneer 25, at the Goodwood Festival of Speed in July 2025.

Munnings is also active in the electric offshore powerboat racing series E1, competing for Team Brazil in 2024 and LeBron James' Team AlUla in 2025.

=== Television career ===
Munnings was the original host of the CBeebies television programme Catie's Amazing Machines in 2018, in which she controlled large and fast vehicles. She opted not to return for its second series to concentrate on her driving career.

Munnings has since returned in Secrets of the Supercars on Dave.

Munnings has hosted for the Goodwood Festival of Speed and offers a driver's perspective co-presenting ITV's Formula E coverage.

== Racing record ==
=== Complete WRC results ===
Year	Entrant	Car	1	2	3	4	5	6	7	Pos.	Points
2020	Catie Munnings	Ford Fiesta R2	MON	SWE; 42	MEX	EST	TUR	ITA	MNZ	NC	0

=== Complete J-WRC results ===
Year	Entrant	Car	1	2	3	4	Pos.	Points
2020	Catie Munnings	Ford Fiesta R2	SWE; 14	EST	ITA	MNZ	NC	0

=== Complete Extreme E results ===
(key)

Year	Team	Car	1	2	3	4	5	6	7	8	9	10	Pos.	Points
2021	Andretti United Extreme E	Spark ODYSSEY 21	DES; Q 4	DES; R 2	OCE; Q 8	OCE; R 9	ARC; Q 4	ARC; R 1	ISL; Q 6	ISL; R 6	JUR; Q 7	JUR; R 3	3rd	103
2022	Genesys Andretti United Extreme E	Spark ODYSSEY 21	DES; 7	ISL1; 7	ISL2; 3	COP; 7	ENE; 4						9th	39
2023	Andretti Altawkilat Extreme E	Spark ODYSSEY 21	DES; 1; 10	DES; 2; 8	HYD; 1; 2	HYD; 2; 7	ISL1; 1; 5	ISL1; 2; 3	ISL2; 1; 6	ISL2; 2; 7	COP; 1 DNS	COP; 2 WD	7th	69
2024	Andretti Altawkilat Extreme E	Spark ODYSSEY 21	DES; 1; 5	DES; 2; 2	HYD; 1; 3	HYD; 2; 3	ISL1; 1 C	ISL1; 2 C	ISL2; 1 C	ISL2; 2 C	VAL; 1 C	VAL; 2 C	4th ^{†}	62 ^{†}
2025	Team Hansen	Spark ODYSSEY 21	DES; 1; 3	DES; 2; 1									N/A	N/A

^{†} Season abandoned.
