= Kevin Hansen (racing driver) =

Swedish rallycross driver

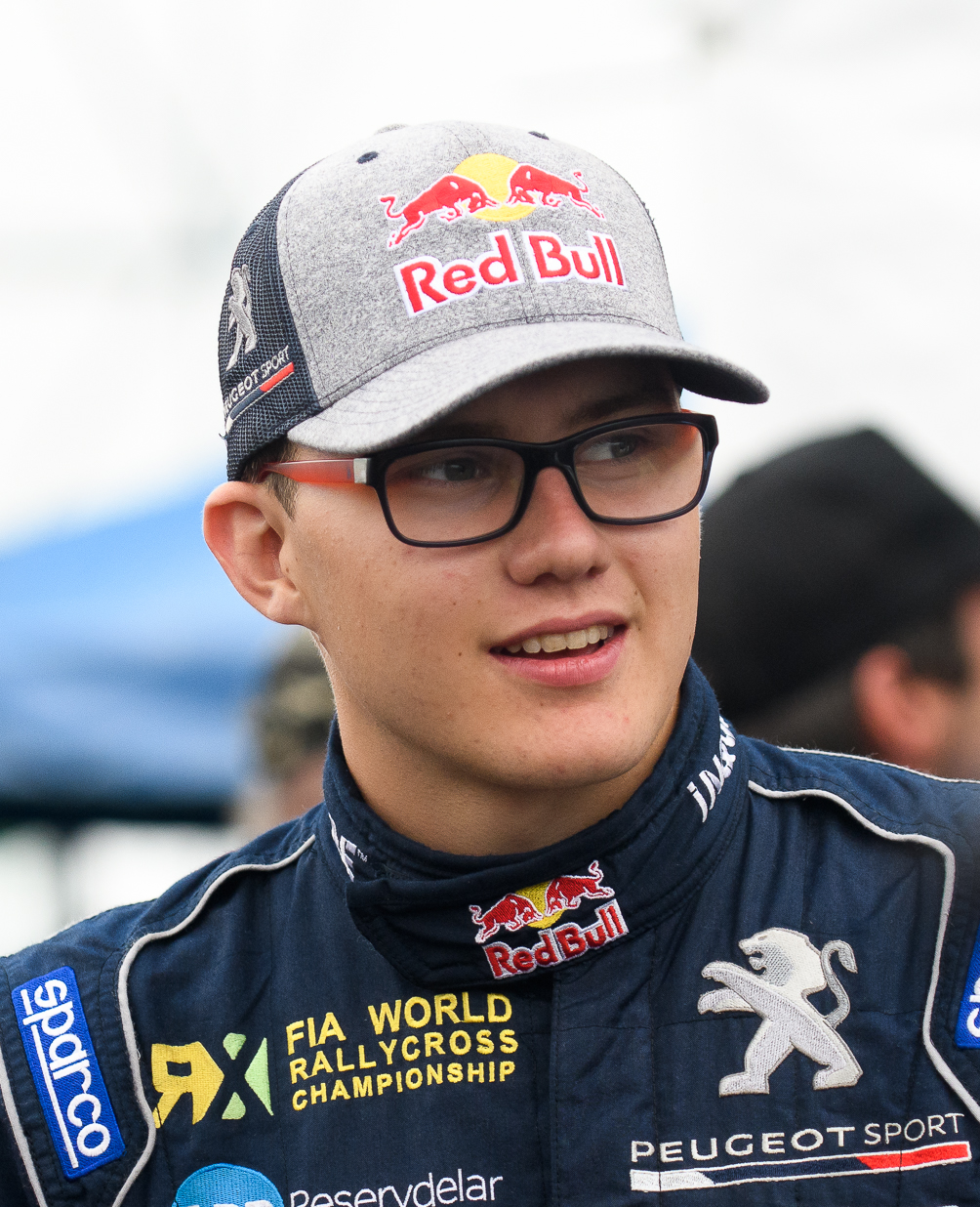
- Hansen at the 2017 World RX of Canada
- Nationality: Swedish
- Born: Mikael Kevin Hansen; 28 May 1998 (age 28) Götene, Sweden
- Relatives: Kenneth Hansen (father); Timmy Hansen (brother)

FIA World Rallycross Championship career
- Debut season: 2015
- Current team: Hansen World RX Team
- Car number: 71
- Former teams: Olsbergs MSE; Team Peugeot-Hansen; Team Peugeot Total; Team Hansen
- Starts: 88
- Wins: 4
- Podiums: 27
- Best finish: 2nd in 2024

FIA ERX Supercar Championship
- Years active: 2016
- Former teams: Peugeot-Hansen Academy
- Starts: 5
- Championships: 1 (2016)
- Wins: 4
- Podiums: 5

RX Lites Cup
- Years active: 2014–2015
- Former teams: Hansen Junior Team
- Starts: 11
- Championships: 1 (2015)
- Wins: 2
- Podiums: 11

Mikael Kevin Hansen (born 28 May 1998) is a rallycross driver from Sweden. He has previously competed in the FIA World Rallycross Championship (WRX) Supercar category for Team Peugeot-Hansen. He has also previously competed in the now defunct Extreme E series.

His father is the 14-time European Rallycross Champion Kenneth Hansen. He is also the youngest driver to race in a WRX event, making his debut at 17 years and 6 months old.

== Career ==
Kevin Hansen is a World Rallycross Championship competitor, with four wins, 27 podiums, and three top-three finishes in the championship.

2019 saw Hansen gain a third place win in the FIA RX Championship and a first place win in the Nitro World Games Rallycross.

Second place in the World RX in 2023 was followed by Hansen's most successful campaign to date, where he finished second once again in a title battle that took him all the way to the final event in Türkiye.

Hansen has also competed in all seasons of the electric off-road championship Extreme E. Joining the fray in the second X Prix of Season 1, Kevin claimed four podiums that year with JBXE.

Hansen then joined E.ON Veloce Racing for the final race of Season 2 with Extreme E Season 1 Champ Molly Taylor, leaving Jenson Button's team. The pair continued into Season 3, where they took three X Prix wins on their way to third in the championship standings.

Two podiums at the 2024 Extreme E Championship season-opener were followed by back-to-back wins at the Hydro X Prix, putting Hansen and Taylor firmly in the lead before the championship came to an abrupt end.

2025 was a momentous year for Kevin Hansen, concluding with his first FIA world title as he took victory at the maiden FIA Extreme H World Cup in Saudi Arabia with Jameel Motorsport.

Now in 2026, Hansen has been confirmed to reunite with Veloce Racing and Molly Taylor for the 2026 FIA Extreme H World Cup to be held in Qiddiya City, Saudi Arabia, following their 2025 win.

Also this year, Hansen has joined with SARGA Motorsport and teammate Sébastien Loeb to race in the FIA Rallycross World Cup in Jakarta.

== Racing record ==
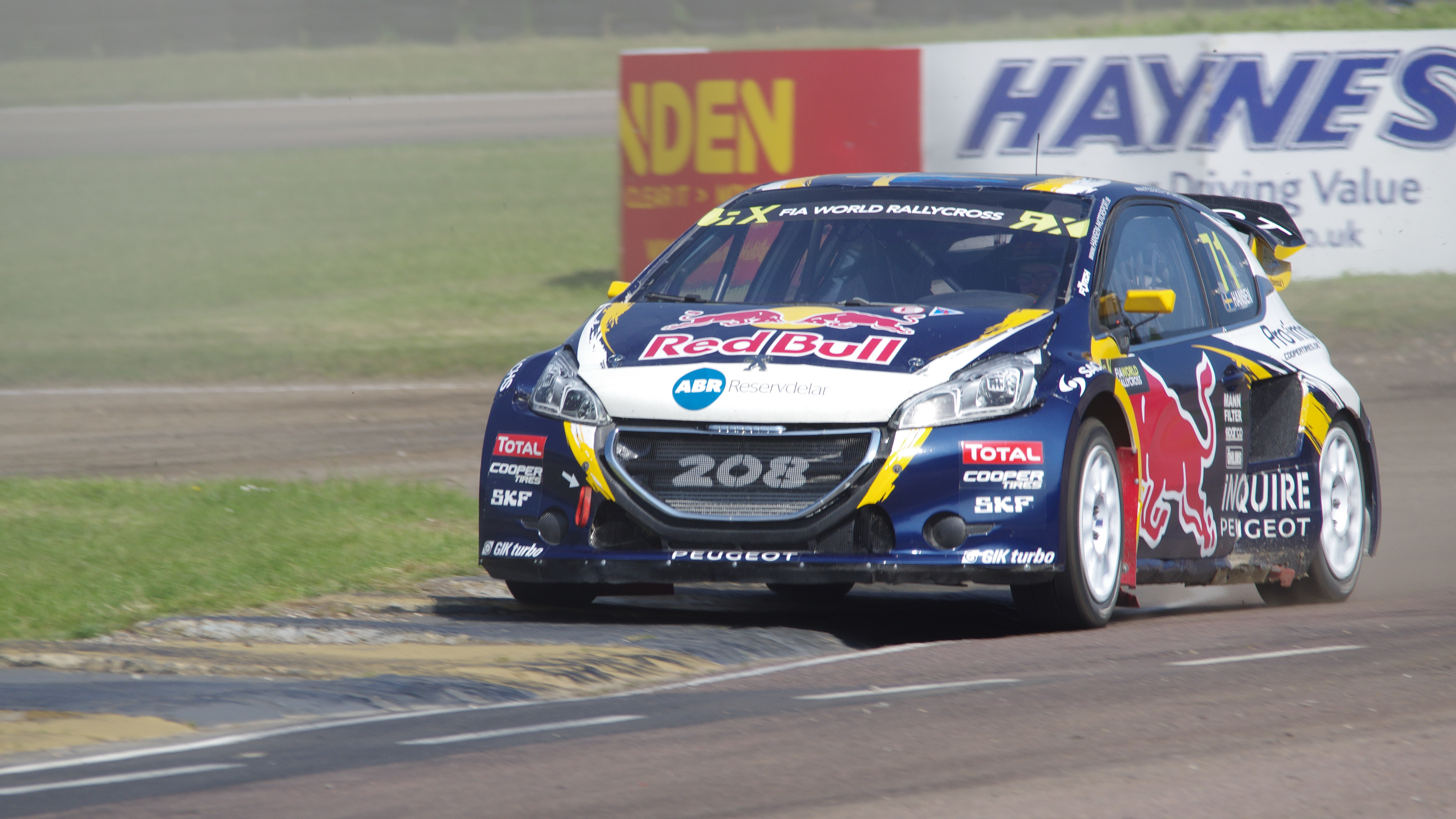
Hansen at the 2016 World RX of Great Britain

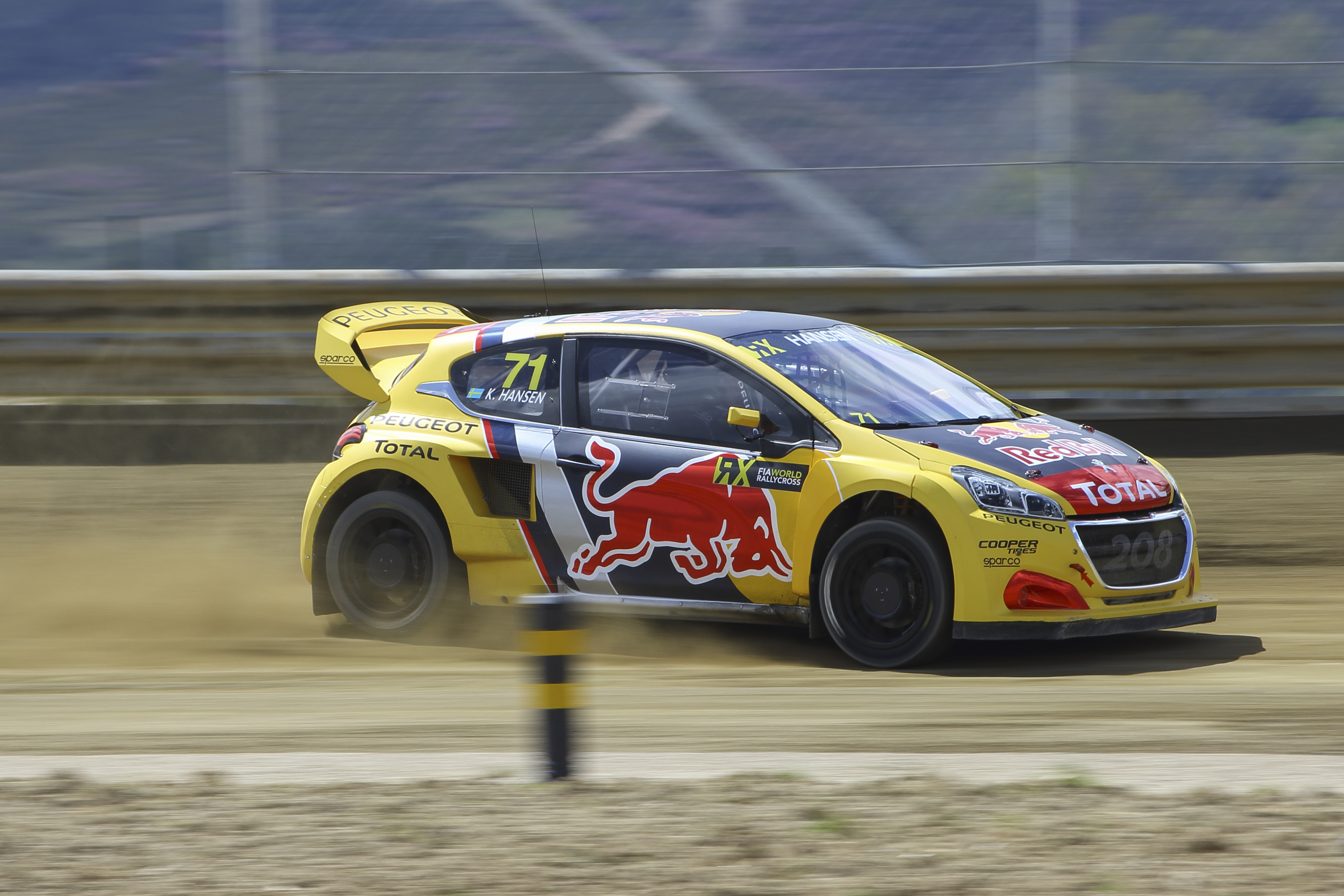
Hansen at the 2018 World RX of Portugal

=== Complete FIA World Rallycross Championship results ===
(key)

==== RX Lites Cup ====
Year	Entrant	Car	1	2	3	4	5	6	7	Lites	Points
2014	Hansen Junior Team	Lites Peugeot 208	POR	GBR	FIN; 1	SWE; 2	ITA; 3	TUR; 2		2nd	99
2015	Hansen Junior Team	Lites Peugeot 208	POR; 2	GBR; 1	SWE; 2	NOR; 2	BAR; 3	TUR; 2	ITA; 2	1st	178

==== Supercar/RX1/RX1e ====
Year	Entrant	Car	1	2	3	4	5	6	7	8	9	10	11	12	13	WRX	Points
2015	Olsbergs MSE	Ford Fiesta ST	POR	HOC	BEL	GBR	GER	SWE	CAN	NOR	FRA	BAR	TUR	ITA	ARG; 5	22nd	16
2016	Peugeot-Hansen Academy	Peugeot 208 WRX	POR; 13	HOC; 19	BEL	GBR; 4	NOR	SWE	CAN	FRA; 11	BAR	LAT	GER; 4	ARG		15th	52
2017	Team Peugeot-Hansen	Peugeot 208 WRX	BAR; 11	POR; 8	HOC; 8	BEL; 21	GBR; 13	NOR; 9	SWE; 13	CAN; 10	FRA; 8	LAT; 10	GER; 6	RSA; 6		8th	115
2018	Team Peugeot Total	Peugeot 208	BAR; 13	POR; 8	BEL; 9	GBR; 6	NOR; 4	SWE; 5	CAN; 9	FRA; 7†	LAT; 6	USA; 7	GER; 6	RSA; 4		8th	145
2019	Hansen Motorsport	Peugeot 208	ABU; 1	BAR; 2	BEL; 7	GBR; 7	NOR; 2	SWE; 2	CAN; 6	FRA; 3	LAT; 4	RSA; 5				3rd	199
2020	Team Hansen	Peugeot 208 WRX	SWE; 8	SWE; 2	FIN; 6	FIN; 7	LAT; 4	LAT; 6	BAR; 3	BAR; 7						5th	135
2021	Hansen World RX Team	Peugeot 208 WRX	ESP; 1	SWE; 2	FRA; 2	LAT; 3	LAT; 5	BNL; 2	POR; 3	GER; 9	GER; 2					4th	191
2022	Hansen World RX Team	Peugeot 208 RX1e	NOR; 7	LAT; 2	LAT; 2	POR; 4	POR; 7	BNL; 2	BNL; 4	ESP; 4	ESP; 6	GER; 5				5th	123
2023	Hansen World RX Team	Peugeot 208 RX1e	POR; 2	NOR; 9	SWE; 4	GBR; C	BNL; C	GER; C								2nd	104
2023	Hansen World RX Team	OMSE ZEROID X1							RSA; 2	RSA; 2	CHN; 1	CHN; 7				2nd	104
2024	Hansen World RX Team	Peugeot 208 RX1e	SWE; 6	SWE; 4	HUN; 6	HUN; 5	BNL; 3	BNL; 2	PRT; 3	PRT; 1	TÜR; 3	TÜR; 4				2nd	197
2025	Hansen World RX Team	Peugeot 208 RX1e	PRT; 4	SWE; 6	HUN; 8	FIN; 3	TUR	TUR								6th	56

^{†} Loss of fifteen championship points – stewards' decision.

=== Complete FIA European Rallycross Championship results ===
(key)

==== JRX Junior Rallycross Cup ====
Year	Entrant	Car	1	2	3	4	5	6	JRX	Points
2012	Hansen Junior Team	JRX Citroën DS3	SWE1; 1	BEL; 2	NED; 3	SWE2; 1	FIN; 1	GER; 1	1st	112
2013	Hansen Junior Team	JRX Citroën DS3	HUN; 3	FIN; 3	NOR; 2	SWE; 1	AUT; 1	GER; 1	1st	123

==== Supercar ====
Year	Entrant	Car	1	2	3	4	5	ERX	Points
2016	Peugeot-Hansen Academy	Peugeot 208 WRX	BEL; 1	NOR; 1	SWE; 1	BAR; 1	LAT; 2	1st	143

=== Complete Global RallyCross Championship results ===
==== GRC Lites ====
Year	Entrant	Car	1	2	3	4	5	6	7	8	9	GRC	Points
2014	Hansen Motorsport	Lites Peugeot 208	AUS	DC	NY	CHA	DAY	LA1; 3	LA2; 6	SEA	LV	9th	73

=== Complete Extreme E results ===
(key)

Year	Team	Car	1	2	3	4	5	6	7	8	9	10	Pos.	Points
2021	JBXE	Spark ODYSSEY 21	DES; Q	DES; R	OCE; Q 4	OCE; R 3	ARC; Q 8	ARC; R 2	ISL; Q 7	ISL; R 3	JUR; Q 5	JUR; R 2	4th	102
2022	JBXE	Spark ODYSSEY 21	DES; 9	ISL1; 3	ISL2; 8	COP; 8							10th	33
2022	Veloce Racing	Spark ODYSSEY 21					ENE; 5						10th	33
2023	Veloce Racing	Spark ODYSSEY 21	DES; 1; 1	DES; 2; 2	HYD; 1; 7	HYD; 2; 1	ISL1; 1; 6	ISL1; 2; 7	ISL2; 1; 3	ISL2; 2; 6	COP; 1; 5	COP; 2; 1	3rd	138
2024	E.ON Next Veloce Racing	Spark ODYSSEY 21	DES; 1; 3	DES; 2; 3	HYD; 1; 1	HYD; 2; 1	ISL1; 1 C	ISL1; 2 C	ISL2; 1 C	ISL2; 2 C	VAL; 1 C	VAL; 2 C	1st ^{†}	83 ^{†}
2025	Jameel Motorsport	Spark ODYSSEY 21	DES; 1; 5	DES; 2; 2									N/A	N/A

^{†} Season abandoned.

Awards and achievements
Preceded by Max Verstappen	FIA Rookie of the Year; 2016	Succeeded by Charles Leclerc
Sporting positions
Preceded by None	European Rallycross JRX Cup Champion; 2012–2013	Succeeded by None
Preceded by Kevin Eriksson	RX Lites Cup Champion; 2015	Succeeded by Cyril Raymond
Preceded by Tommy Rustad	European Rallycross Supercar Champion; 2016	Succeeded by Anton Marklund
