= Mikaela Åhlin-Kottulinsky =

Swedish racing driver (born 1992)

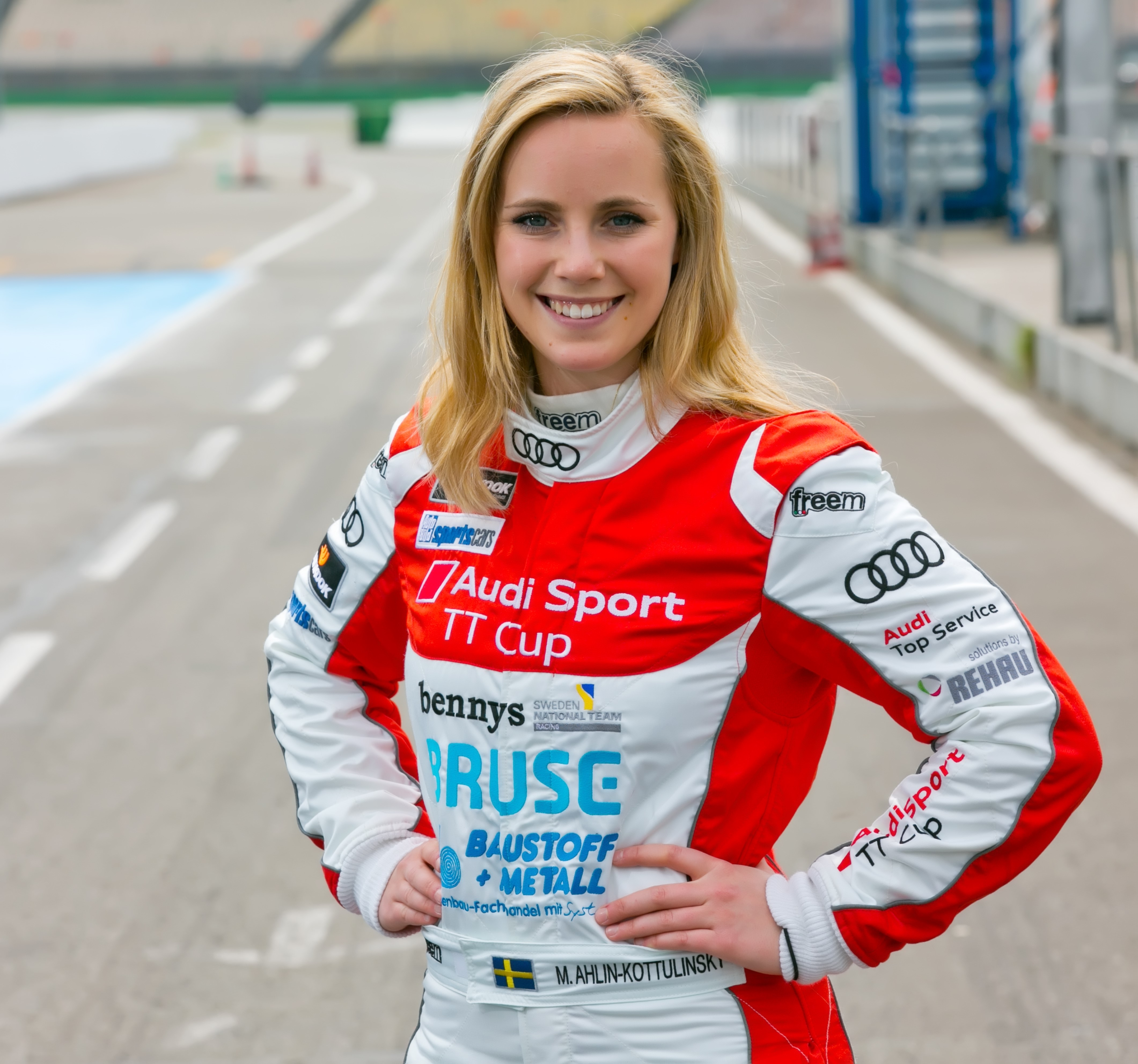
- Åhlin-Kottulinsky in the 2015 Audi Sport TT Cup
- Nationality: (Sweden) Swedish
- Born: 13 November 1992 (age 34) Karlstad, Sweden

Extreme E career
- Debut season: 2021
- Current team: Rosberg X Racing
- Categorisation: FIA Silver
- Former teams: JBXE
- Starts: 8
- Wins: 2
- Podiums: 6
- Poles: 2
- Best finish: 1st in 2023

TCR Scandinavia Touring Car Championship career
- Debut season: 2017
- Teams: PWR Racing
- Car number: 19
- Starts: 61
- Wins: 4
- Podiums: 19
- Poles: 1
- Fastest laps: 4
- Best finish: 2nd in 2021

Previous series
- 2016–17 2015 2012–14 2012: ADAC GT Masters; Audi Sport TT Cup; Volkswagen Scirocco R-Cup; Porsche Carrera Cup Scandinavia

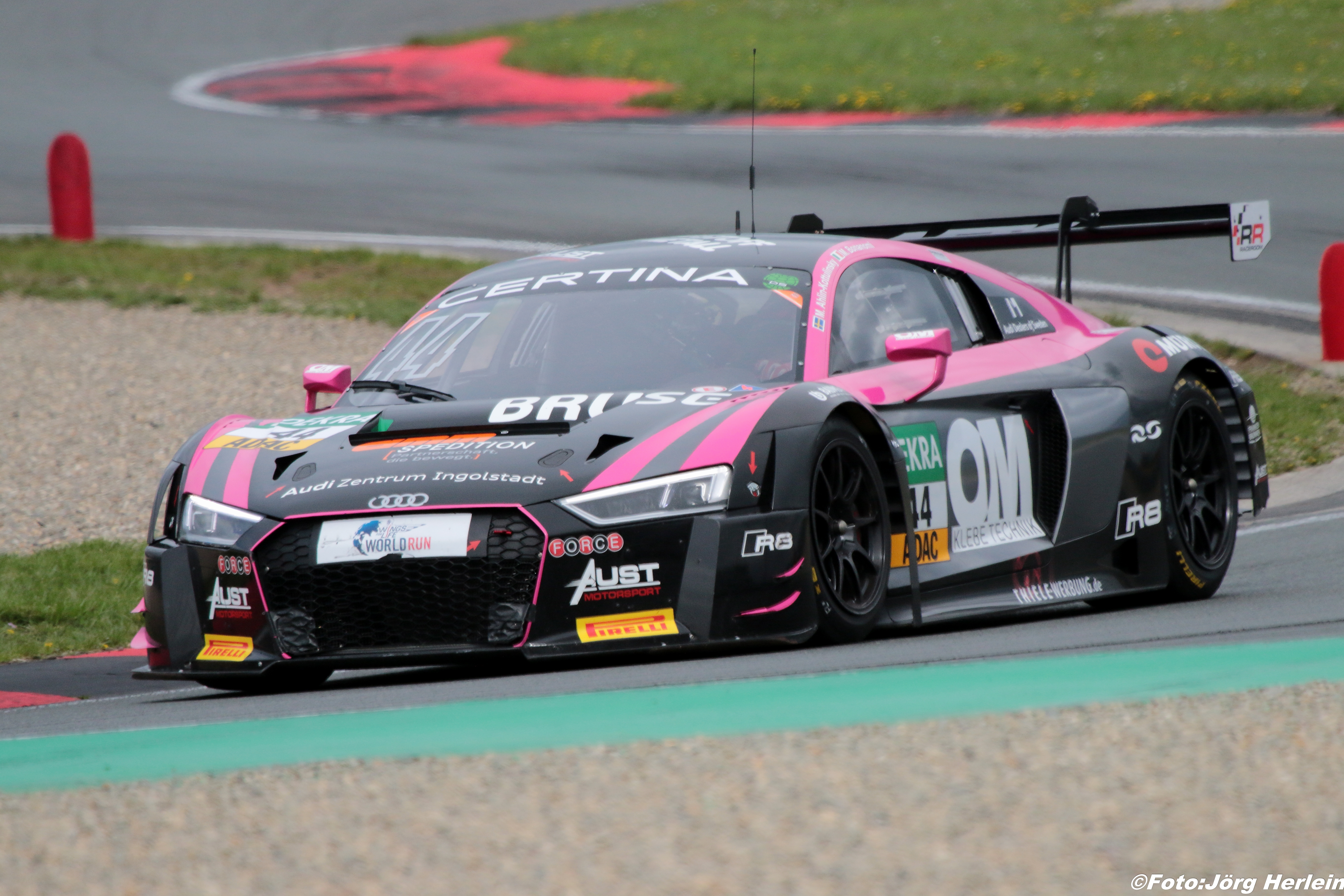
2016 ADAC GT Masters

Mikaela Åhlin-Kottulinsky (born 13 November 1992) is a Swedish racing driver currently competing in the Extreme H Championship for Kristoffersson Motorsport.

== Career ==
=== Early career ===
Born on 13 November 1992, in Karlstad, Åhlin-Kottulinsky started racing at the age of 12 in go-karts. In the autumn of 2011, she stepped up to touring car racing when she took part in the FIA Women in Motorsport's shoot-out, where she finished second and got the chance to race in the Volkswagen Scirocco R-Cup in 2012.

=== Volkswagen Scirocco R Cup ===
Åhlin-Kottulinsky raced in the series for three seasons, and in 2014 she became the first woman in history to win a race in a Volkswagen-supported championship. At the end of 2014, Volkswagen decided to end their one-make cup racing series, with Audi Sport taking their place and launching the Audi Sport TT Cup. 165 drivers applied for the series, and 18 drivers where chosen to compete in the cup, with Åhlin-Kottulinsky being one of them. Her best result in 2015 was a third place at the Norisring, with two fastest laps set during the course of the season. From 2016 until her switch to the STCC, she raced in the German ADAC GT Masters series, competing in an Audi R8 LMS.

=== STCC TCR Scandinavia Touring Car Championship ===
In 2017, Åhlin-Kottulinsky joined the STCC, driving for PWR Racing - Junior Team in an Audi RS 3 LMS, even though the rest of her team competed with SEAT León TCRs, as she was under an Audi contract as part of the Audi Sport racing academy.

In 2018, in her second season in the STCC, Åhlin-Kottulinsky became the first female racing driver in Swedish touring car history to win a race, taking victory in the second heat at Karlskoga in August until all cars of the PWR Racing team were excluded later that evening following a protest from their rivals, who claimed they were running with non-regulation exhausts. The team appealed the exclusion and won their case a month later, with Åhlin-Kottulinsky's victory reinstated.

Åhlin-Kottulinsky re-signed with PWR Racing for the 2019 TCR Scandinavia Touring Car Championship, a replacement series for the STCC following the organisers' bankruptcy over the winter. She made history again as she claimed the first pole position for a female driver at the opening round of the season at Knutstorp, going on to win the first race of the season, claiming her second career victory in Swedish touring cars. She went on to finish the season sixth in the drivers' championship standings, taking a further four podium finishes over the course of the season.

For 2020, Åhlin-Kottulinsky again re-signed with PWR Racing to compete in the STCC TCR Scandinavia season, racing the brand new Cupra Leon Competición. She finished the season ninth with two podiums.

In 2021, Åhlin-Kottulinsky finished second in the standings to her teammate Robert Dahlgren, again driving the PWR Racing Cupra León Competición.

In 2022, after announcing her Extreme E contract with Rosberg X Racing, Åhlin-Kottulinsky confirmed that she would not be racing in with PWR, but may pursue other racing program opportunities, as she wants to "race more than the five Extreme E events" she currently has.

=== Extreme E ===
In 2021, Åhlin-Kottulinsky raced with Jenson Button's JBXE team in the Extreme E championship with Kevin Hansen. They finished the season in third place overall.

On 4 February 2022, Åhlin-Kottulinsky was announced as Rosberg X Racing's driver alongside fellow Swede and four-time FIA World Rallycross Champion Johan Kristoffersson. They won the first round of the season in Neom, Saudi Arabia.

== Personal life ==
Åhlin-Kottulinsky comes from a racing family. Mikaela's grandfather was Silesian Count Freddy Kottulinsky, who won the 1980 Paris-Dakar Rally. Her father, Jerry Åhlin, raced between 1983 and 1991 in the European Rally Championship and between 1984 and 2000 took part in six WRC races in which he scored one point. Her mother, Susanne Kottulinsky, participated between 1982 and 2002 in the European Rally Championship with Opel, Volvo, Audi, and her younger brother, Fredrik Åhlin, is a rally driver.

Åhlin-Kottulinsky dated Formula One driver Max Verstappen while he was racing for Toro Rosso. Their relationship ended in 2016.

== Racing record ==
=== Career summary ===
Season	Series	Team	Races	Wins	Poles	F/Laps	Podiums	Points	Position
2012	Volkswagen Scirocco R-Cup	N/A	10	0	0	0	0	82	19th
2012	Porsche Carrera Cup Scandinavia	Xlander Racing	5	0	0	0	0	48	12th
2013	Renault Clio Cup JTCC	N/A	7	0	0	0	0	26	12th
2013	Volkswagen Scirocco R-Cup	N/A	9	0	0	0	1	195	8th
2014	Volkswagen Scirocco R-Cup	N/A	10	1	0	1	1	188	9th
2014	RallyX Sweden	JC Race Teknik	3	?	?	?	?	17	8th
2015	Audi Sport TT Cup	N/A	12	0	0	2	1	75	15th
2016	ADAC GT Masters	Aust Motorsport	14	0	0	0	0	1	52nd
2017	ADAC GT Masters	Audi Sport Racing Academy	12	0	0	0	0	0	NC
2017	TCR Scandinavia Touring Car Championship	PWR Racing – Junior Team	15	0	0	0	0	6	20th
2018	TCR Scandinavia Touring Car Championship	SEAT Dealer Team – PWR Racing	12	1	0	0	1	39	10th
2019	TCR Scandinavia Touring Car Championship	PWR Racing – SEAT Dealer Team	14	1	1	2	5	167	6th
2020	STCC TCR Scandinavia Touring Car Championship	PWR Racing – SEAT Dealer Team	12	0	0	0	2	79	9th
2021	STCC TCR Scandinavia Touring Car Championship	Cupra Dealer Team – PWR Racing	18	2	0	2	11	259	**2nd**
2021	Extreme E	JBXE	5	0	N/A	N/A	4	102	4th
2021	Nitro Rallycross Championship - SxS	N/A	2	1	N/A	N/A	2	N/A	NC†
2022	Extreme E	Rosberg X Racing	3	2	N/A	N/A	2	60	**2nd**
2022	Porsche Sprint Challenge Scandinavia	Porsche Experience Racing	4	3	1	2	3	84	10th
2022-23	Nitro Rallycross Championship - NEXT Europe	N/A							
2023	Extreme E	Rosberg X Racing	10	3	N/A	N/A	7	159	**1st**
2023	FIA European Rallycross Championship - RX2e	Team E KMS	5	0	N/A	N/A	2	66	**3rd**
2023	Porsche Carrera Cup Scandinavia	JC Raceteknik	5	0	0	0	0	9	24th
2023	FIA World Rallycross Championship - RX1e	Volkswagen Dealerteam BAUHAUS	2	0	N/A	N/A	0	13	13th
2025	Nürburgring Langstrecken-Serie - SP3T	Goroyan RT by sharky-racing							
2026	Nürburgring Langstrecken-Serie - TCR								

^{†} Non-championship event.
^{*} Season still in progress.

=== Complete Volkswagen Scirocco R-Cup results ===
(key) (Races in bold indicate pole position; races in italics indicate fastest lap)

Year	No	Car	1	2	3	4	5	6	7	8	9	10	Points	Position
2012	12	Volkswagen Scirocco R	(Germany) HOC	(Germany) LAU	(United Kingdom) BHA	(Austria) RBR		(Germany) NOR	(Germany) NÜR	(Germany) OSC		(Germany) HOC	82	19th
2012	12	Volkswagen Scirocco R	21	18	20	17	19	22	20	13	13	Ret	82	19th
2013	14	Volkswagen Scirocco R	(Germany) HOC	(Austria) RBR		(Germany) NOR	(Germany) NÜR		(Germany) OSC		(Germany) HOC		195	8th
2013	14	Volkswagen Scirocco R	11	8	17	4	2	8	13	7	21		195	8th
2014	19	Volkswagen Scirocco R	(Germany) HOC		(Germany) OSC		(Germany) NOR	(Austria) RBR		(Germany) NÜR		(Germany) HOC	188	9th
2014	19	Volkswagen Scirocco R	5	9	15	23	1	4	4	5	Ret	21	188	9th

=== Complete Audi Sport TT Cup results ===
(key) (Races in bold indicate pole position) (Races in italics indicate fastest lap)

Year	No	Car	1-2		3-4		5-6		7-8		9-10		11-12		Points	Position
2015	89	Audi Sport TT	(Germany) HOC		(Germany) NOR		(Austria) RBR		(Germany) OSC		(Germany) NÜR		(Germany) HOC		75	15th
2015	89	Audi Sport TT	9	Ret	8	3	10	18	Ret	12	6	Ret	Ret	Ret	75	15th

=== Complete ADAC GT Masters results ===
(key) (Races in bold indicate pole position) (Races in italics indicate fastest lap)

Year	Team	No	Car	1-2		3-4		5-6		7-8		9-10		11-12		13-14		Points	Position
2016	Aust Motorsport	44	Audi R8 LMS	(Germany) OSC		(Germany) SAC		(Germany) LAU		(Austria) RBR		(Germany) NÜR		(Netherlands) ZAN		(Germany) HOC		1	52nd
2016	Aust Motorsport	44	Audi R8 LMS	Ret	17	23	24	19	11	17	20	11	17	15	18	10	19	1	52nd
2017	Audi Sport Racing Academy	8	Audi R8 LMS	(Germany) OSC		(Germany) LAU		(Austria) RBR		(Netherlands) ZAN		(Germany) NÜR		(Germany) SAC		(Germany) HOC		0	NC
2017	Audi Sport Racing Academy	8	Audi R8 LMS	17	23	20	20	Ret	17	21	13	22	17	19	18	-	-	0	NC

=== Complete Scandinavian Touring Car Championship results ===
(key) (Races in bold indicate pole position) (Races in italics indicate fastest lap)

Year	Team	Car	1	2	3	4	5	6	7	8	9	10	11	12	13	14	15	16	17	18	19	20	21	DC	Points
2017	PWR Racing – Junior Team	Audi RS3 LMS TCR	KNU; 1 Ret	KNU; 2 Ret	KNU; 3; 12	ALA; 1	ALA; 2	ALA; 3	SOL; 1 Ret	SOL; 2; 8	SOL; 3; 11	FAL; 1; 9	FAL; 2; 11	FAL; 3; 15	GEL; 1 Ret	GEL; 2; 12	GEL; 3; 15	AND; 1 Ret	AND; 2; 15	AND; 3; 15	MAN; 1	MAN; 2	MAN; 3	20th	6
2018	SEAT Dealer Team – PWR Racing	Cupra León TCR	KNU; 1; 11	KNU; 2; 18	AND; 1; 8	AND; 2; 7	FAL; 1; 12	FAL; 2; 9	GEL; 1 Ret	GEL; 2; 1	RUD; 1; 15	RUD; 2; 16	MAN; 1; 9	MAN; 2; 12										10th	39
2019	PWR Racing – SEAT Dealer Team	Cupra León TCR	**KNU**; **1**; 1	KNU; 2 Ret	AND; 1; 5	AND; 2; 10	SKE; 1; 4	SKE; 2; 2	FAL; 1; 3	FAL; 2; 7	GEL; 1; 4	GEL; 2; 3	JYL; 1; 6	JYL; 2; 5	MAN; 1; 6	MAN; 2; 3								6th	167
2020	PWR Racing – SEAT Dealer Team	Cupra León Competición TCR	GEL; 1 Ret	GEL; 2; 4	GEL; 3; 10	SKE; 1; 8	SKE; 2; 10	SKE; 3 Ret	MAN; 1; 3	MAN; 2; 7	MAN; 3; 3	KNU; 1; 5	KNU; 2; 4	KNU; 3 Ret										9th	79
2021	Cupra Dealer Team – PWR Racing	Cupra León Competición TCR	LJU; 1; 2	LJU; 2; 3	LJU; 3 Ret	SKE; 1; 5	SKE; 2; 2	SKE; 3; 6	GEL; 1; 2	GEL; 2; 2	GEL; 3; 3	AND; 1; 2	AND; 2; 2	AND; 3; 9	MAN; 1; 6	MAN; 2; 5	MAN; 3; 1	KNU; 1; 1	KNU; 2; 2	KNU; 3; 9				2nd	259

=== Complete Extreme E results ===
(key)

Year	Team	Car	1	2	3	4	5	6	7	8	9	10	Pos.	Points
2021	JBXE	Spark ODYSSEY 21	DES; Q 6	DES; R 6	OCE; Q 4	OCE; R 3	ARC; Q 8	ARC; R 2	ISL; Q 7	ISL; R 3	JUR; Q 5	JUR; R 2	4th	102
2022	Rosberg X Racing	Spark ODYSSEY 21	DES; 1	ISL1; 5	ISL2; 1	COP; 6	ENE; 10						2nd	68
2023	Rosberg X Racing	Spark ODYSSEY 21	DES; 1; 3	DES; 2; 3	HYD; 1; 5	HYD; 2; 5	ISL1; 1; 1	ISL1; 2; 1	ISL2; 1; 4	ISL2; 2; 2	COP; 1; 1	COP; 2; 2	1st	159
2024	Rosberg X Racing	Spark ODYSSEY 21	DES; 1; 1	DES; 2; 4	HYD; 1; 4	HYD; 2; 4	ISL1; 1 C	ISL1; 2 C	ISL2; 1 C	ISL2; 2 C	VAL; 1 C	VAL; 2 C	3rd ^{†}	67 ^{†}
2025	Team KMS	Spark ODYSSEY 21	DES; 1; 1	DES; 2; 3									N/A	N/A

^{†} Season abandoned.
