= 2021 Ocean X-Prix =

Round 2 of 5 of the 2021 Extreme E Championship
← Previous race	Next race →

Race details
- Date: 29–30 May 2021
- Location: Lac Rose, Senegal
- Course: Sand bars, salt beds, gravel
- Course length: 6.2 km (3.9 miles)
- Distance: 2 laps, 12.4 km (7.7 miles)

Pole position
Drivers	(France) Sébastien Loeb; (Spain) Cristina Gutiérrez	Team X44
- Time: 21:44.856

Podium
First	(Australia) Molly Taylor; (Sweden) Johan Kristoffersson	Rosberg X Racing
Second	(France) Stéphane Sarrazin; (United Kingdom) Jamie Chadwick	Veloce Racing
Third	(Sweden) Mikaela Åhlin-Kottulinsky; (Sweden) Kevin Hansen	JBXE

The 2021 Ocean X-Prix was an Extreme E off-road race that was held on 29 and 30 May 2021 in Lac Rose, Senegal. It was the second round of the electric off-road racing car series' inaugural season. The final was won by championship leaders Molly Taylor and Johan Kristoffersson for the Rosberg X Racing team, ahead of Veloce Racing and JBXE.

== Classification ==
=== Qualifying ===
Pos.	No.	Team	Drivers	Q1		Q2		Total		Gap	Points
Pos.	No.	Team	Drivers	Laps	Time	Laps	Time	Laps	Time	Gap	Points
1	44	(United Kingdom) Team X44	(France) Sébastien Loeb (Spain) Cristina Gutiérrez	2	10:47.289	2	10:57.567	4	21:44.856		12
2	6	(Germany) Rosberg X Racing	(Sweden) Johan Kristoffersson (Australia) Molly Taylor	2	11:02.310	2	11:10.128	4	22:12.438	+27.582	11
3	125	(Germany) Abt Cupra XE	(Sweden) Mattias Ekström (Germany) Jutta Kleinschmidt	2	11:13.122	2	11:07.691	4	22:20.813	+35.957	10
4	22	(United Kingdom) JBXE	(Sweden) Kevin Hansen (Sweden) Mikaela Åhlin-Kottulinsky	2	11:13.405	2	11:12.021	4	22:25.426	+40.570	9
5	5	(United Kingdom) Veloce Racing	(United Kingdom) Jamie Chadwick (France) Stéphane Sarrazin	2	11:37.599	2	11:27.771	4	23:05.370	+1:20.514	8
6	42	(Spain) Xite Energy Racing	(United Kingdom) Oliver Bennett (Spain) Christine GZ	2	11:52.806	2	11:43.655	4	23:36.461	+1:51.605	7
7	99	(United States) Segi TV Chip Ganassi Racing	(United States) Sara Price (United States) Kyle LeDuc	2	10:51.528	2	14:50.287	4	25:41.815	+3:56.959	6+5^{1}
8	23	(United States) Andretti United Extreme E	(Sweden) Timmy Hansen (United Kingdom) Catie Munnings	2	14:39.665	2	11:17.403	4	25:57.068	+4:12.212	5
9	55	(Spain) Acciona | Sainz XE Team	(Spain) Carlos Sainz (Spain) Laia Sanz	1	12:16.845	2	11:23.131	3	23:39.976	+1 lap	4

Key
Colour	Advance to
Black	Semi-Final 1
Silver	Semi-Final 2
Bronze	Shootout
Gold	Final

Notes:

- ^1 – Team awarded 5 additional points for being fastest in the Super Sector.

=== Semi-final 1 ===
Pos.	No.	Team	Drivers	Laps	Time	Points
1	6	(Germany) Rosberg X Racing	(Sweden) Johan Kristoffersson (Australia) Molly Taylor	2	11:05.029	
2	44	(United Kingdom) Team X44	(France) Sébastien Loeb (Spain) Cristina Gutiérrez	2	+2.262	
3	125	(Germany) Abt Cupra XE	(Sweden) Mattias Ekström (Germany) Jutta Kleinschmidt	2	+3.242	12

=== Semi-final 2 ===
Pos.	No.	Team	Drivers	Laps	Time	Points
1	22	(United Kingdom) JBXE	(Sweden) Kevin Hansen (Sweden) Mikaela Åhlin-Kottulinsky	2	11:24.263	
2	5	(United Kingdom) Veloce Racing	(United Kingdom) Jamie Chadwick (France) Stéphane Sarrazin	2	+29.703	
3	42	(Spain) Xite Energy Racing	(United Kingdom) Oliver Bennett (Spain) Christine GZ	2	+43.241	10

=== Shootout ===
Pos.	No.	Team	Drivers	Laps	Time	Points
1	99	(United States) Segi TV Chip Ganassi Racing	(United States) Sara Price (United States) Kyle LeDuc	2	11:17.759	8
2	55	(Spain) Acciona | Sainz XE Team	(Spain) Carlos Sainz (Spain) Laia Sanz	2	+7.748	6
3	23	(United States) Andretti United Extreme E	(Sweden) Timmy Hansen (United Kingdom) Catie Munnings	2	+8.769	4

=== Final ===
Pos.	No.	Team	Drivers	Laps	Time	Points
1	6	(Germany) Rosberg X Racing	(Australia) Molly Taylor (Sweden) Johan Kristoffersson	2	21:52.101	25
2	5	(United Kingdom) Veloce Racing	(France) Stéphane Sarrazin (United Kingdom) Jamie Chadwick	2	+14.676	19
3	22	(United Kingdom) JBXE	(Sweden) Mikaela Åhlin-Kottulinsky (Sweden) Kevin Hansen	0	+2 laps	18
4	44	(United Kingdom) Team X44	(Spain) Cristina Gutiérrez (France) Sébastien Loeb	0	+2 laps	15

- The race was red-flagged at the end of lap 1 to rescue the beached cars of JBXE and X44. It was resumed with a standing start with the second drivers. Only RXR's Johan Kristoffersson and Veloce's Jamie Chadwick were able to take the restart.

Previous race: 2021 Desert X-Prix	Extreme E Championship; 2021 season	Next race: 2021 Arctic X-Prix
Previous race: N/A	Ocean X-Prix	Next race: N/A
