= 2014 Volkswagen Scirocco R-Cup =

The 2014 Volkswagen Scirocco R-Cup was the fifth and final Volkswagen Scirocco R-Cup season, the replacement for the ADAC Volkswagen Polo Cup. The season started on 3 May at Hockenheim and ended on 18 October at the same venue, after six rounds and ten races, all in support of the Deutsche Tourenwagen Masters.

The final championship title went to South Africa's Jordan Pepper – following in the footsteps of countryman, Kelvin van der Linde – after winning the first three races, and six races in total during the season. Pepper won the championship by 58 points ahead of his next closest competitor, Jason Kremer, who won races at Oschersleben and the Nürburgring. Third place in the championship went to Victor Bouveng, 26 points in arrears of Kremer, after three successive third places finishes at the Red Bull Ring and the Nürburgring. The only other drivers to win races during the season were Chris Smiley, who finished fourth in the championship after winning at the Red Bull Ring, and Mikaela Åhlin-Kottulinsky, who became the only female driver to win in the series, in a shortened race at the Norisring. In the Junior Cup sub-classification, Nicolaj Møller Madsen was the highest placed competitor on four occasions, and ultimately won by 41 points ahead of Moritz Oberheim, who won three times.

For the 2015 season, the Audi Sport TT Cup replaces the Volkswagen Scirocco R-Cup as a support category to the Deutsche Tourenwagen Masters.

== Drivers ==
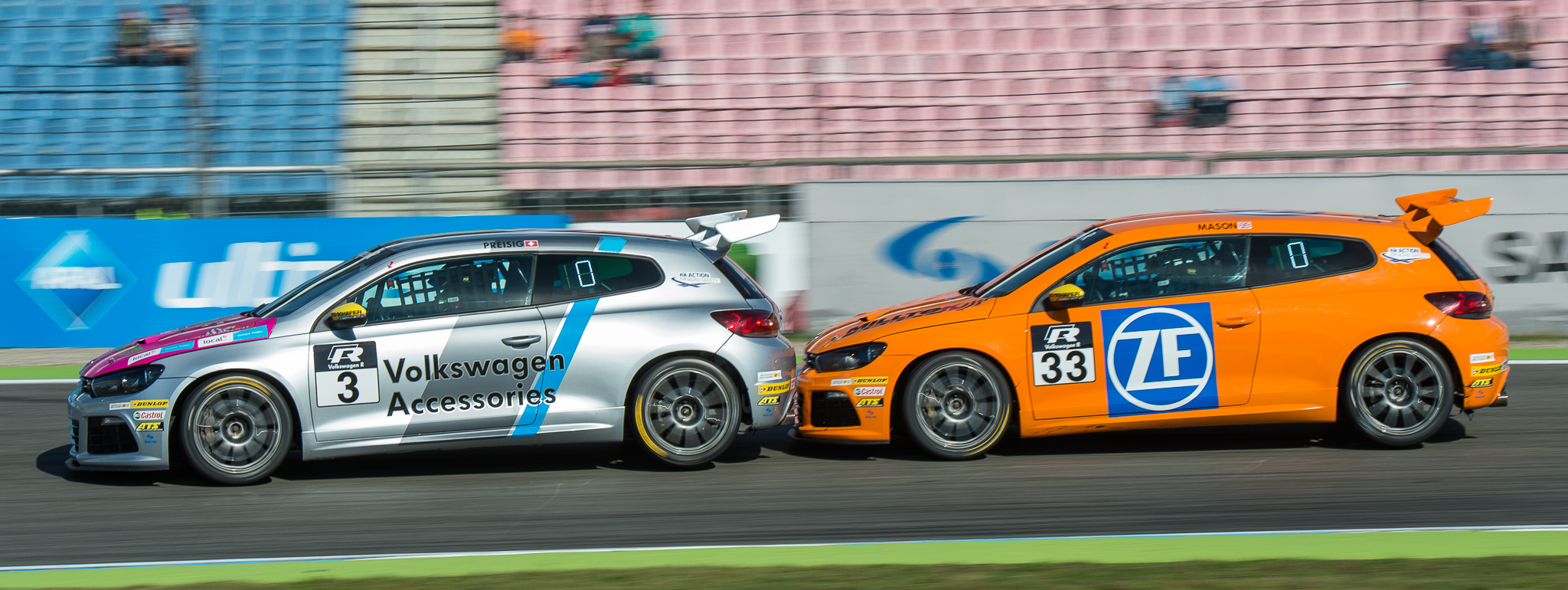
Jasmin Prerisig and Aaron Mason at Hockenheim

- All cars were powered by Volkswagen engines and used a Volkswagen Scirocco chassis.

No.	Driver	Class	Rounds
2	(Austria) Lukas Jäger	J	All
3	(Switzerland) Jasmin Preisig	J	All
5	(France) Yann Ehrlacher	J	All
6	(France) Lucile Cypriano	J	All
7	(Germany) Moritz Oberheim	J	All
8	(Austria) Marcel Müller	J	1–5
9	(Denmark) Alexander Lauritzen	J	All
10	(Germany) André Gies	J	All
11	(Germany) Pascal Hoffmann	J	All
12	(Sweden) Simon Larsson	J	All
14	(Denmark) Nicolaj Møller Madsen	J	All
15	(Denmark) Frederik Schandorff	J	1–3
16	(Germany) Jason Kremer	P	All
17	(South Africa) Jordan Pepper	P	All
18	(Germany) Michael Müller	P	All
19	(Sweden) Mikaela Åhlin-Kottulinsky	P	All
20	(Germany) Manuel Fahnauer	P	All
21	(United Kingdom) Josh Caygill	P	All
22	(United Kingdom) Chris Smiley	P	All
23	(Sweden) Victor Bouveng	P	All
24	(Germany) Dominik Peitz	P	All
25	(Germany) Doreen Seidel	P	All
26	(Monaco) Pierre Casiraghi	G	1, 6
27	(Germany) Sven Hannawald	G	3
28	(Poland) Gosia Rdest	G	4
29	(Austria) Dominique Regatschnig	G	4
30	(Switzerland) Benjiamin Albertalli	G	5
31	(India) Rahil Noorani	G	5
32	(Lithuania) Robertas Kupčikas	G	6
33	(United Kingdom) Joe Fulbrook	G	6
34	(Germany) Albert von Thurn und Taxis	G	6
40	(Austria) Marc Coleselli	J	All

Icon	Class
P	Pro Cup
J	Junior Cup
G	Guest

== Race calendar and results ==
Round		Circuit	Date	Pole position	Fastest lap	Winning driver	Winning Junior
1	R1	(Germany) Hockenheimring, Baden-Württemberg	3 May	(South Africa) Jordan Pepper	(South Africa) Jordan Pepper	(South Africa) Jordan Pepper	(Austria) Marc Coleselli
1	R2	(Germany) Hockenheimring, Baden-Württemberg	4 May	(South Africa) Jordan Pepper	(Germany) Dominik Peitz	(South Africa) Jordan Pepper	(Denmark) Nicolaj Møller Madsen
2	R1	(Germany) Motorsport Arena Oschersleben, Saxony-Anhalt	17 May	(South Africa) Jordan Pepper	(South Africa) Jordan Pepper	(South Africa) Jordan Pepper	(Germany) Moritz Oberheim
2	R2	(Germany) Motorsport Arena Oschersleben, Saxony-Anhalt	18 May	(South Africa) Jordan Pepper	(South Africa) Jordan Pepper	(Germany) Jason Kremer	(Denmark) Nicolaj Møller Madsen
3		(Germany) Norisring, Nuremberg	29 June	(South Africa) Jordan Pepper	(Sweden) Mikaela Åhlin-Kottulinsky	(Sweden) Mikaela Åhlin-Kottulinsky	(Germany) Moritz Oberheim
4	R1	(Austria) Red Bull Ring, Spielberg	2 August	(Germany) Moritz Oberheim	(Germany) Dominik Peitz	(United Kingdom) Chris Smiley	(Denmark) Nicolaj Møller Madsen
4	R2	(Austria) Red Bull Ring, Spielberg	3 August	(United Kingdom) Chris Smiley	(Germany) Moritz Oberheim	(South Africa) Jordan Pepper	(Germany) Moritz Oberheim
5	R1	(Germany) Nürburgring, Rhineland-Palatinate	16 August	(South Africa) Jordan Pepper	(Germany) Manuel Fahnauer	(Germany) Jason Kremer	(Denmark) Nicolaj Møller Madsen
5	R2	(Germany) Nürburgring, Rhineland-Palatinate	17 August	(South Africa) Jordan Pepper	(Denmark) Alexander Lauritzen	(South Africa) Jordan Pepper	(France) Yann Ehrlacher
6		(Germany) Hockenheimring, Baden-Württemberg	18 October	(Germany) Manuel Fahnauer	(Germany) Manuel Fahnauer	(South Africa) Jordan Pepper	(Austria) Marc Coleselli
