= Laia Sanz =

Motorcycle racer

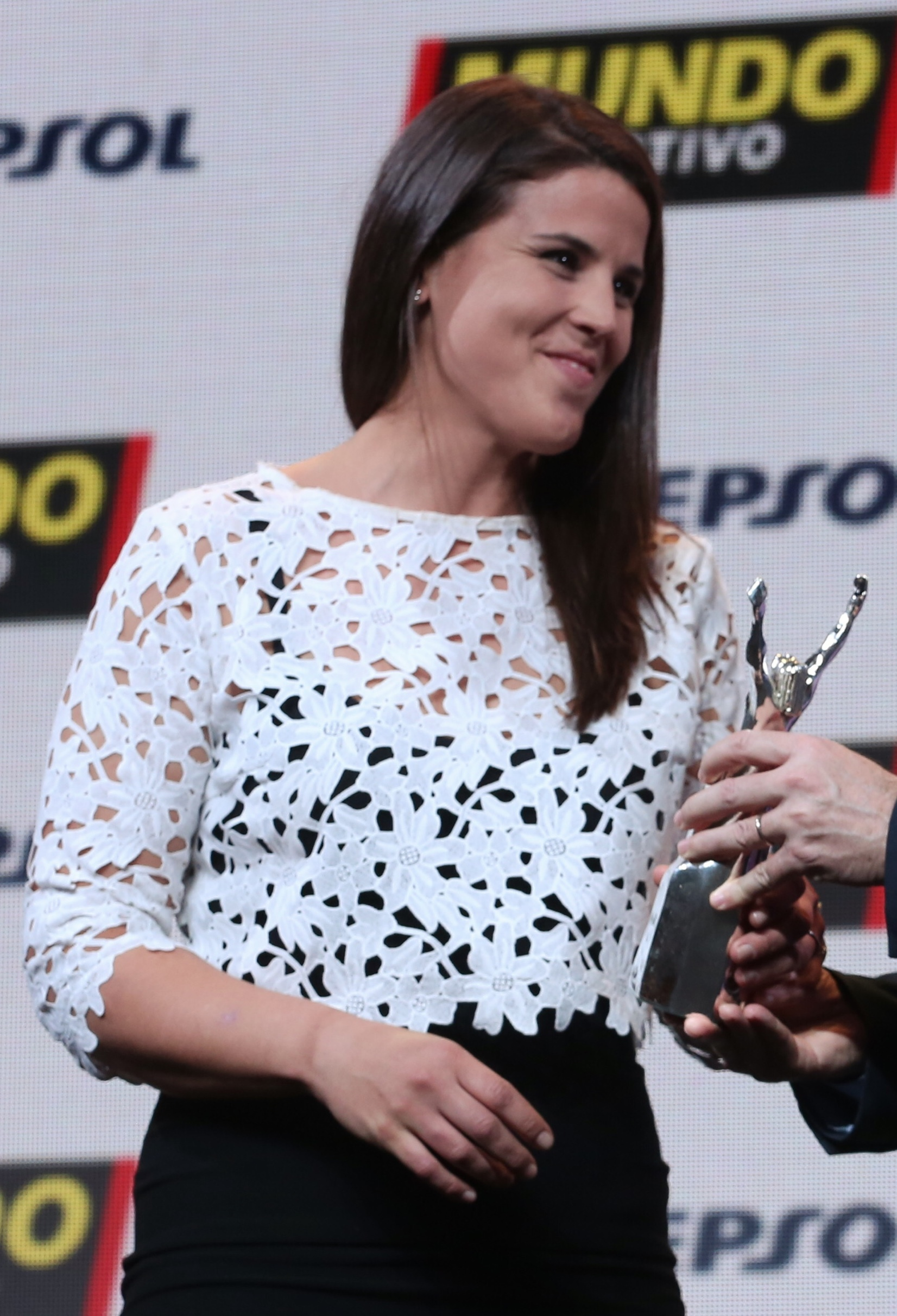
- Nationality: Spanish
- Born: Laia Sanz Pla-Giribert; 11 December 1985 (age 40) Corbera de Llobregat, Barcelona
- Current team: Gas Gas

Championship titles
- 2000–2006, 2008–2013: International Trial World Champion

Laia Sanz Pla-Giribert (born 11 December 1985), also known as Laia Sanz, is a Spanish sportswoman. She is a fourteen-time Women's Trial World Champion and ten-time Women's Trial European Champion in outdoor motorcycle trials.

Sanz was also a member of the Spanish Female Team in the Trial des Nations, helping the team win the event five times (2000, 2002, 2008, 2010, 2011).

In 2010, Sanz competed in the Women's Enduro World Championship for the first time. In 2011, she participated for the first time in the Dakar Rally, winning the Female motorcycle category and finishing 39th overall, a position that she managed to repeat a year later.

== Biography ==
=== Early years ===
Born in 1985, Sanz learned how to ride a bicycle when she was four years old. The first contact with a motorbike came the same year, when her father used to seat her on the petrol tank of his bike and ride her around. By the time she was five, the passion had grown and, without telling anybody, she began to ride her brother's motorbike. Laia's older brother, Joan, also a motorbike aficionado, had a Montesa Cota 25 cc.

In 1992, aged seven and encouraged by her mother, Sanz participated in a race at the Catalan Junior Championship that was taking place in her village. She finished eighth and last, but she wanted to come back for more. The next year she joined the Championship from race one. With that step, she joined a male-dominated sport without any female championships at the time.

In 1997, Sanz won her first race in a male championship, riding an 80 cc bike. She also took part in an international female Trial competition for the first time. In 1998, she took part in the First Edition of the Women's Trial European Championship, unofficial at the time, and won. She was only twelve years old and competing against more mature riders, attracting attention from fans and professional teams. Thanks to such a great result she started to consider a professional career as a rider. Also that year she took part in the Spanish Trial Championship, where she was the only female rider.

=== International début ===
In 2000, Sanz won the Spanish Cadet Championship, again the only female rider. This was the most satisfying of her titles according to her. This year saw the First edition of the official Women's Trial European Championship and Women's Trial World Championship. She took part in both and achieves her first World title and finishes second in the European Championship. She also took part as a member of the Spanish team in the first edition of the Female Trial Des Nations, and she won it.

From then on, Sanz has collected many titles in female international competitions, winning the Women's Trial World Championship seven consecutive times (2000–2006 and 2021). She has also competed in Male Championships with good achievements.

Sanz has raced for Beta, but in 2004, she moved to the official Montesa team. She has won World, European and Spanish titles with both makers. Her teammates at Montesa-HRT were Toni Bou and Takahisa Fujinami until 2011. For the 2012 season she raced for Gas Gas.

=== The Dakar and Enduro ===
In 2010, Sanz finally got the much awaited chance to train for the Dakar Rally, a childhood dream, and joined the Dakar Legend Jordi Arcarons as a trainer, another childhood dream. She also participated in the Women’s Enduro World Championship as part of her training for the Dakar and, she achieved a respectable third place after only participating in two of the three events. She also kept competing in observed trials where she won World, Europe and Spanish championship and Trial des Nations.

Sanz participated in the 2011 edition of the Dakar Rally, on a Honda CRF450X as part of the Team Arcarons RST KH-7, with Arcarons as a backup. She won the Female class, and managed a consistent performance with a 39th position overall. At the Women’s Enduro World Championship she took part in all the events and finished second.

For the 2012 edition of the Dakar Rally, Sanz moved to the Gas Gas team, making their official début at the rally, and had Marc Guasch as her backup. Sanz suffered an accident during the fourth stage, injuring her hand and damaging the petrol tank on her Gas Gas 450 cc but she kept going and managed to finish the stage. Despite having to ride "solo" for the rest of the rally, Sanz repeated her 39th position and was the only woman to finish the rally raid on a motorbike, Female class.

In 2015, Sanz achieved her best finish and also the best finish ever for a female rider at the Dakar, taking ninth place in the motorbike class on a Honda.

In the 2016 edition of the Dakar Rally, Sanz raced for KTM and placed 15th in the motorbike general ranking.

In the 2020 Dakar Rally, Sanz finished 25th overall.

=== Auto racing ===
Sanz has made several appearances at her home race in the 24H series, the 24 Hours of Barcelona. She won her class in 2011. She also made guest appearances in the SEAT León Eurocup in 2014 and 2015.

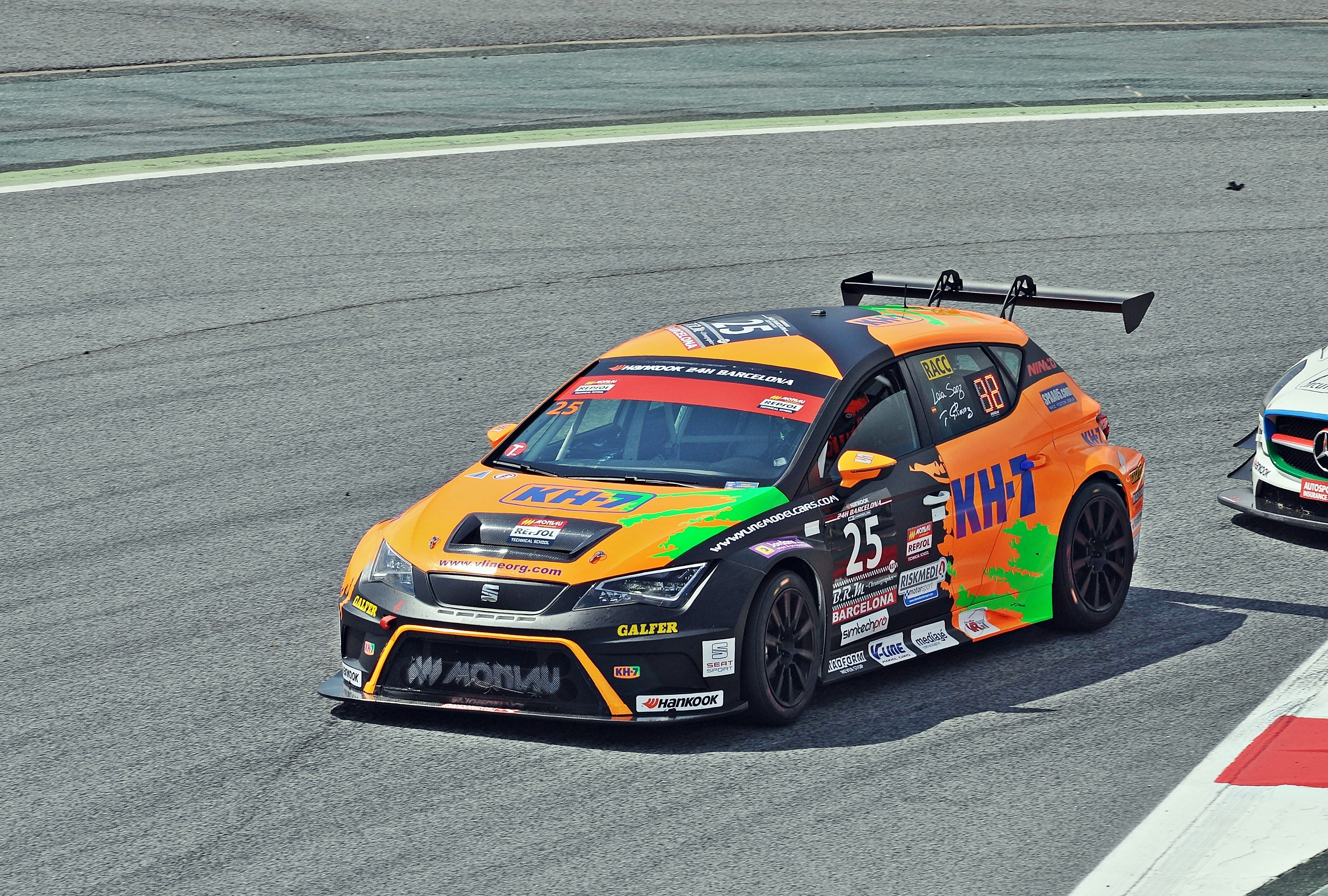
Sanz driving for KH7 - Monlau in a Seat León Cup Racer

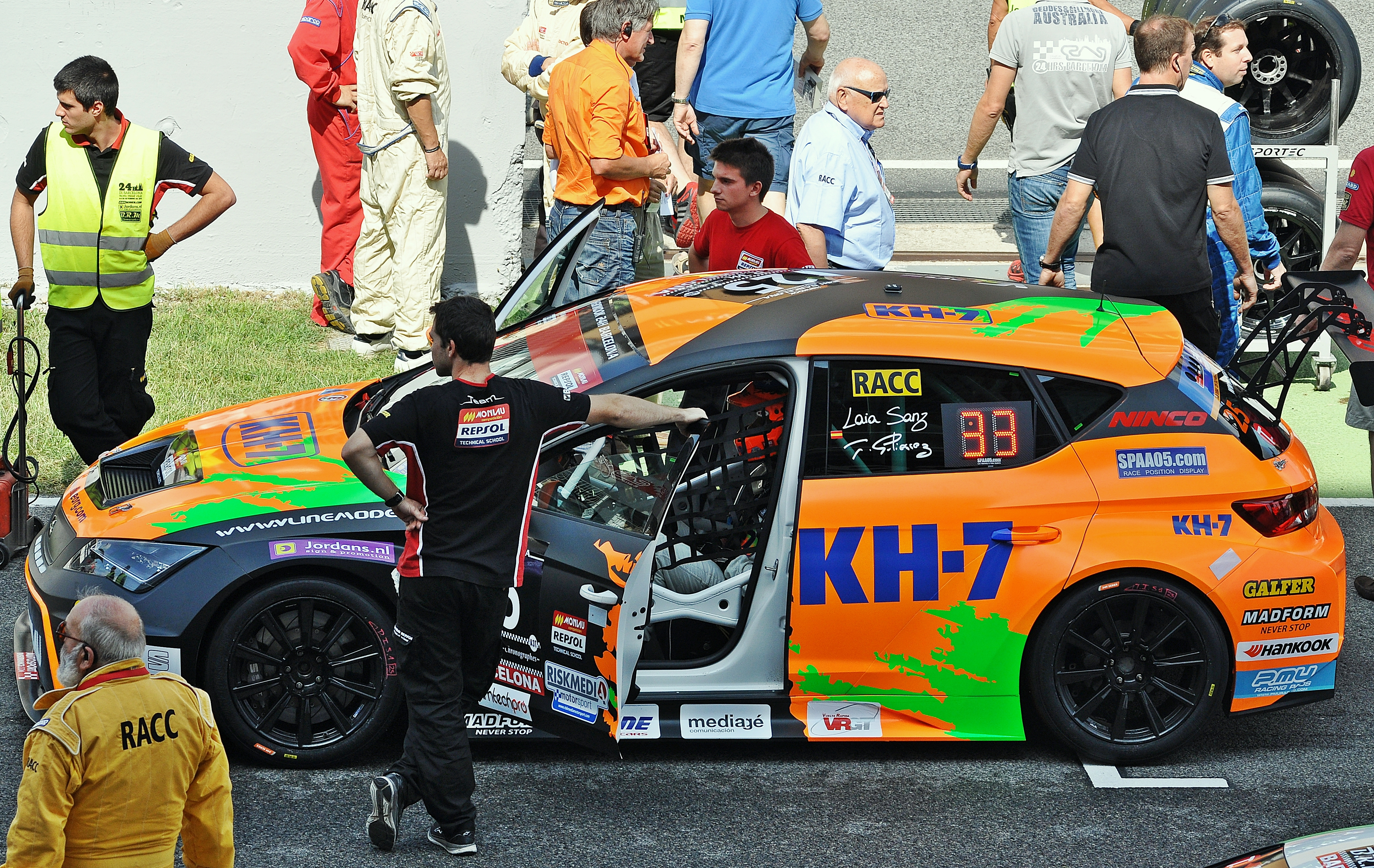
Sanz's Seat León Cup Racer on the grid.

== Titles ==
| Year | Motorbike | Women's World Trial Championship | Women's Trial European Championship | Women's Trial des Nations^{A} | Women's Trial Spanish Championship | Women's Enduro World Championship | Dakar Rally |
|---|---|---|---|---|---|---|---|
| 2000 | Beta | 1st | 2nd | 1st | - | - | - |
| 2001 | Beta | 1st | 2nd | 2nd | - | - | - |
| 2002 | Beta | 1st | 1st | 1st | - | - | - |
| 2003 | Beta | 1st | 1st | 3rd | 1st | - | - |
| 2004 | Montesa | 1st | 1st | 3rd | 1st | - | - |
| 2005 | Montesa | 1st | 1st | 3rd | 1st | - | - |
| 2006 | Montesa | 1st | 1st | 2nd | 1st | - | - |
| 2007 | Montesa | 2nd | 1st | 4th | 1st | - | - |
| 2008 | Montesa | 1st | 1st | 1st | 1st | - | - |
| 2009 | Montesa | 1st | 1st | 2nd | 1st | - | - |
| 2010 | Montesa | 1st | 1st | 1st | 1st | 3rd Honda | - |
| 2011 | Montesa | 1st | 1st | 1st | - | 2nd Honda | 1st Female class 39th Overall Honda |
| 2012 | Gas Gas | 1st | - | 1st | - | 1st | 1st Female class 39th Overall Gas Gas |
| 2013 | Montesa | 1st | - | - | - | 1st (Honda) | 1st Female class 93rd Overall Gas Gas |
| 2014 | Montesa | - | - | - | - | 1st (Honda) | 16th Overall Honda |
| 2015 | Montesa | - | - | - | - | 1st (KTM) | 9th Overall Honda |
| 2016 | KTM | - | - | - | - | 1st | 15th Overall KTM |

^ARefers to position achieved with Spanish National Team.

== Racing record ==
=== Complete Extreme E results ===
(key)

| Year | Team | Car | 1 | 2 | 3 | 4 | 5 | 6 | 7 | 8 | 9 | 10 | Pos. | Points |
|---|---|---|---|---|---|---|---|---|---|---|---|---|---|---|
| 2021 | Acciona | Sainz XE Team | Spark ODYSSEY 21 | DES; Q 2 | DES; R 4 | OCE; Q 9 | OCE; R 8 | ARC; Q 6 | ARC; R 3 | ISL; Q 4 | ISL; R 7 | JUR; Q 3 | JUR; R 5 | 5th | 90 |
| 2022 | Acciona | Sainz XE Team | Spark ODYSSEY 21 | DES; 2 | ISL1; 4 | ISL2; 4 | COP; 2 | ENE; 7 | | | | | | 3rd | 60 |
| 2023 | Acciona | Sainz XE Team | Spark ODYSSEY 21 | DES; 1; 2 | DES; 2; 1 | HYD; 1; 6 | HYD; 2; 4 | ISL1; 1; 2 | ISL1; 2; 2 | ISL2; 1; 1 | ISL2; 2; 9 | COP; 1; 2 | COP; 2; 4 | 2nd | 144 |
| 2024 | Acciona | Sainz XE Team | Spark ODYSSEY 21 | DES; 1; 4 | DES; 2; 1 | HYD; 1; 2 | HYD; 2; 2 | ISL1; 1 C | ISL1; 2 C | ISL2; 1 C | ISL2; 2 C | VAL; 1 C | VAL; 2 C | 2nd ^{†} | 76 ^{†} |
| 2025 | Acciona | Sainz XE Team | Spark ODYSSEY 21 | DES; 1; 4 | DES; 2; 8 | | | | | | | | | N/A | N/A |

^{†} Season abandoned.

=== Complete World Rally-Raid Championship results ===
(key)

| Year | Team | Car | Class | 1 | 2 | 3 | 4 | 5 | Pos. | Points |
|---|---|---|---|---|---|---|---|---|---|---|
| 2026 | Ebro Audax Motorsport | Ebro S800 XRR | Ultimate | DAK; 20^{4} | PRT | DES | MOR | ABU | 22nd* | 4* |

^{*}Season still in progress.

Awards
| Preceded by Gemma Mengual | Spanish Sportswoman of the Year; 2006 | Succeeded by Mayte Martínez |
