= 2021 Arctic X-Prix =

Round 3 of 5 of the 2021 Extreme E Championship
← Previous race	Next race →

Race details
- Date: 28–29 August 2021
- Location: Russell Glacier, Greenland
- Course: Gravel and rock
- Course length: 8.6 km (5.4 miles)
- Distance: 2 laps, 17.3 km (10.7 miles)

Pole position
Drivers	(Spain) Cristina Gutiérrez; (France) Sébastien Loeb	Team X44

Podium
First	(United Kingdom) Catie Munnings; (Sweden) Timmy Hansen	Andretti United XE
Second	(Sweden) Kevin Hansen; (Sweden) Mikaela Åhlin-Kottulinsky	JBXE
Third	(Spain) Laia Sanz; (Spain) Carlos Sainz	Acciona | Sainz XE

The 2021 Arctic X-Prix was an Extreme E off-road race that was held on 28 and 29 August 2021 in Russell Glacier, near Kangerlussuaq, Greenland. It was the third round of the electric off-road racing car series' inaugural season, and marked the first ever motorsport event held in Greenland. The final was won by Catie Munnings and Timmy Hansen for the Andretti United Extreme E team, ahead of JBXE and Acciona | Sainz XE Team.

== Classification ==
=== Qualifying ===
Pos.	No.	Team	Drivers	Q1			Q2			Combined	Points
Pos.	No.	Team	Drivers	Laps	Time	CP	Laps	Time	CP	Combined	Points
1	44	(United Kingdom) Team X44	(Spain) Cristina Gutiérrez (France) Sébastien Loeb	2	13:45.235	9	2	14:37.598	8	17	12
2	125	(Germany) Abt Cupra XE	(Germany) Jutta Kleinschmidt (Sweden) Mattias Ekström	2	13:48.947	8	1	6:30.962	3	11	11
3	6	(Germany) Rosberg X Racing	(Sweden) Johan Kristoffersson (Australia) Molly Taylor	2	15:29.638	2	2	14:26.647	9	11	10
4	23	(United States) Andretti United Extreme E	(Sweden) Timmy Hansen (United Kingdom) Catie Munnings	2	15:15.185	3	2	14:41.564	7	10	9+5^{1}
5	5	(United Kingdom) Veloce Racing	(New Zealand) Emma Gilmour (France) Stéphane Sarrazin	2	14:19.436	6	2	16:22.810	4	10	8
6	55	(Spain) Acciona | Sainz XE Team	(Spain) Carlos Sainz (Spain) Laia Sanz	2	14:40.880	4	2	14:57.024	5	9	7
7	99	(United States) Segi TV Chip Ganassi Racing	(United States) Sara Price (United States) Kyle LeDuc	2	13:51.631	7	0	No time	1	8	6
8	22	(United Kingdom) JBXE	(Sweden) Mikaela Åhlin-Kottulinsky (Sweden) Kevin Hansen	1	8:21.531	1	2	14:42.102	6	7	5
9	42	(Spain) Xite Energy Racing	(Spain) Christine GZ (United Kingdom) Oliver Bennett	2	14:36.977	5	0	No time	2	7	4

Key
Colour	Advance to
Black	Semi-Final 1
Silver	Semi-Final 2
Bronze	Crazy Race
Gold	Final

Notes:

- Tie-breakers were determined by Super Sector times.
- ^1 – Team awarded 5 additional points for being fastest in the Super Sector.

=== Semi-final 1 ===
Pos.	No.	Team	Drivers	Laps	Time	Points
1	44	(United Kingdom) Team X44	(Spain) Cristina Gutiérrez (France) Sébastien Loeb	2	13:18.923	
2	55	(Spain) Acciona | Sainz XE Team	(Spain) Carlos Sainz (Spain) Laia Sanz	2	+0.729	
3	5	(United Kingdom) Veloce Racing	(New Zealand) Emma Gilmour (France) Stéphane Sarrazin	2	+3.175	10

=== Semi-final 2 ===
Pos.	No.	Team	Drivers	Laps	Time	Points
1	23	(United States) Andretti United Extreme E	(Sweden) Timmy Hansen (United Kingdom) Catie Munnings	2	13:24.577	
2	6	(Germany) Rosberg X Racing	(Sweden) Johan Kristoffersson (Australia) Molly Taylor	2	+11.190	
3	125	(Germany) Abt Cupra XE	(Germany) Jutta Kleinschmidt (Sweden) Mattias Ekström	2	+54.166	8

=== Crazy Race ===
Pos.	No.	Team	Drivers	Laps	Time	Points
1	22	(United Kingdom) JBXE	(Sweden) Mikaela Åhlin-Kottulinsky (Sweden) Kevin Hansen	2	13:42.608	
2	42	(Spain) Xite Energy Racing	(Spain) Christine GZ (United Kingdom) Oliver Bennett	1	+1 lap	6
3	99	(United States) Segi TV Chip Ganassi Racing	(United States) Sara Price (United States) Kyle LeDuc	0	+2 laps	4

=== Final ===
Pos.	No.	Team	Drivers	Laps	Time	Points
1	23	(United States) Andretti United Extreme E	(United Kingdom) Catie Munnings (Sweden) Timmy Hansen	2	13:13.239	25
2	22	(United Kingdom) JBXE	(Sweden) Kevin Hansen (Sweden) Mikaela Åhlin-Kottulinsky	2	+4.159	19
3	55	(Spain) Acciona | Sainz XE Team	(Spain) Laia Sanz (Spain) Carlos Sainz	2	+22.866	18
4	44	(United Kingdom) Team X44	(France) Sébastien Loeb (Spain) Cristina Gutiérrez	2	+27.914	15
5	6	(Germany) Rosberg X Racing	(Australia) Molly Taylor (Sweden) Johan Kristoffersson	2	+1:01.005	12

Previous race: 2021 Ocean X-Prix	Extreme E Championship; 2021 season	Next race: 2021 Island X-Prix
Previous race: N/A	Arctic X-Prix	Next race: N/A
