= Christine GZ =

Italian-Canarian race driver

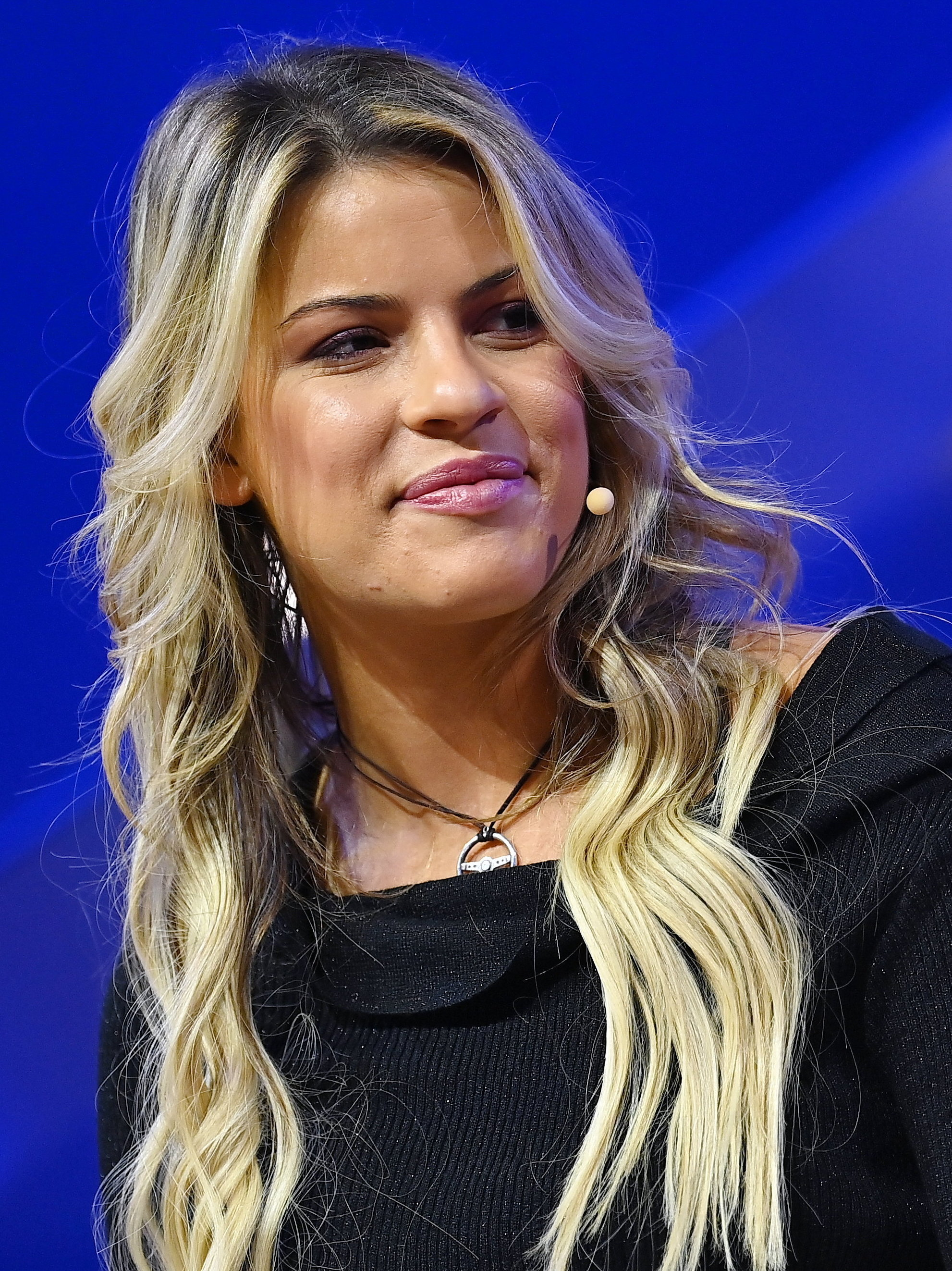
- Christine GZ in 2022
- Nationality: (Italy) Italian (Spain) Spanish
- Full name: Christine Giampaoli Zonca
- Born: July 22, 1993 (age 33) Pondicherry, India

Extreme E career
- Debut season: 2021
- Former teams: Xite Energy Racing, Veloce Racing, Carl Cox Motorsport
- Starts: 13
- Wins: 0
- Podiums: 1
- Poles: 0
- Best finish: 9th in 2021

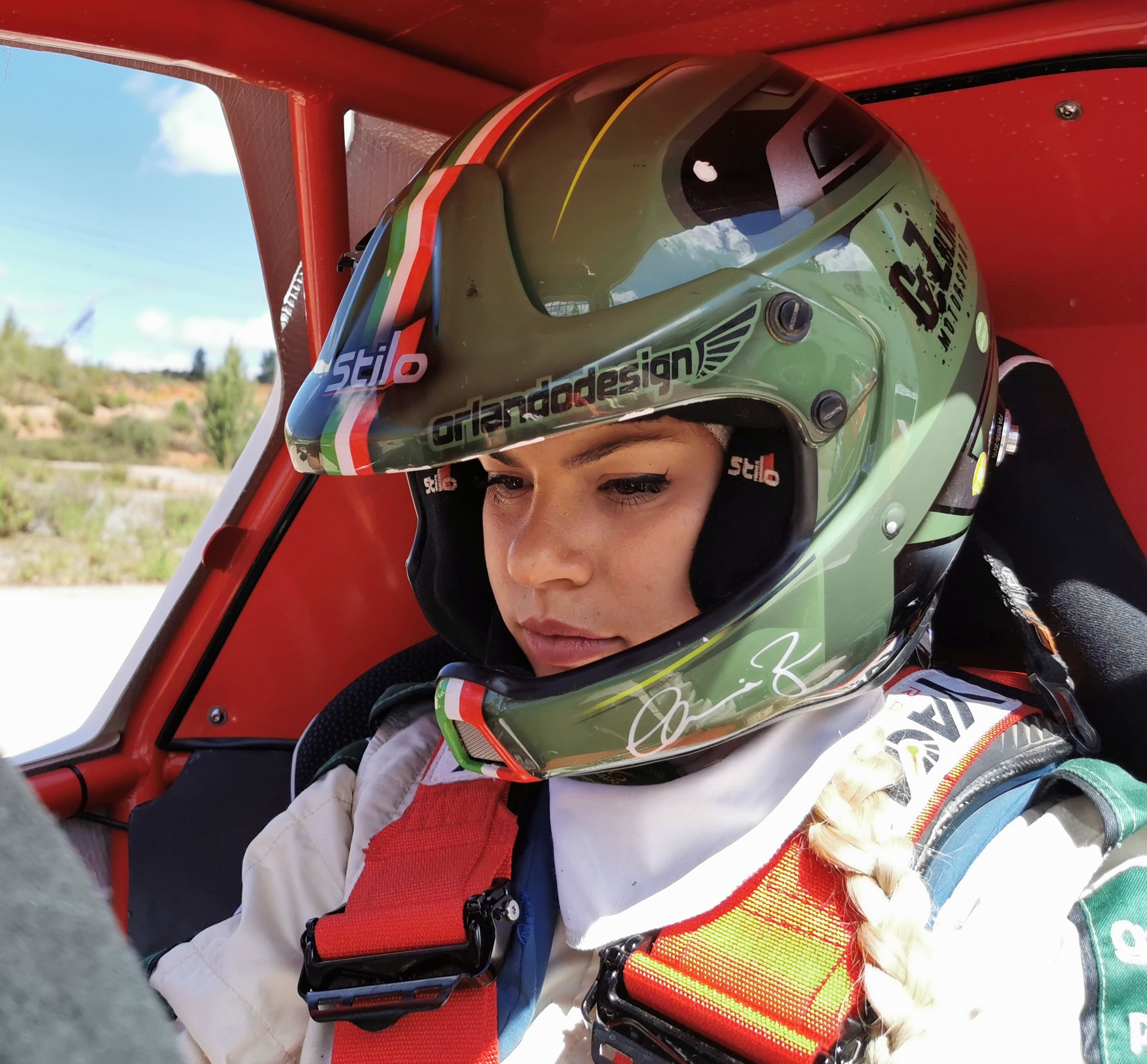
Christine GZ in 2019

Christine Giampaoli Zonca (born 22 July 1993), more commonly known by her nickname Christine GZ, is an Italian-Spanish rally and off-road race driver. After an off-road racing career in America, competing with the team Dynamic Racing, Zonca raced in Europe with the Avatel Telecom Race Team. In late 2020, Zonca scored a third place in the Andalucia Rally round of the FIA World Cross Country Championship.

== Biography ==
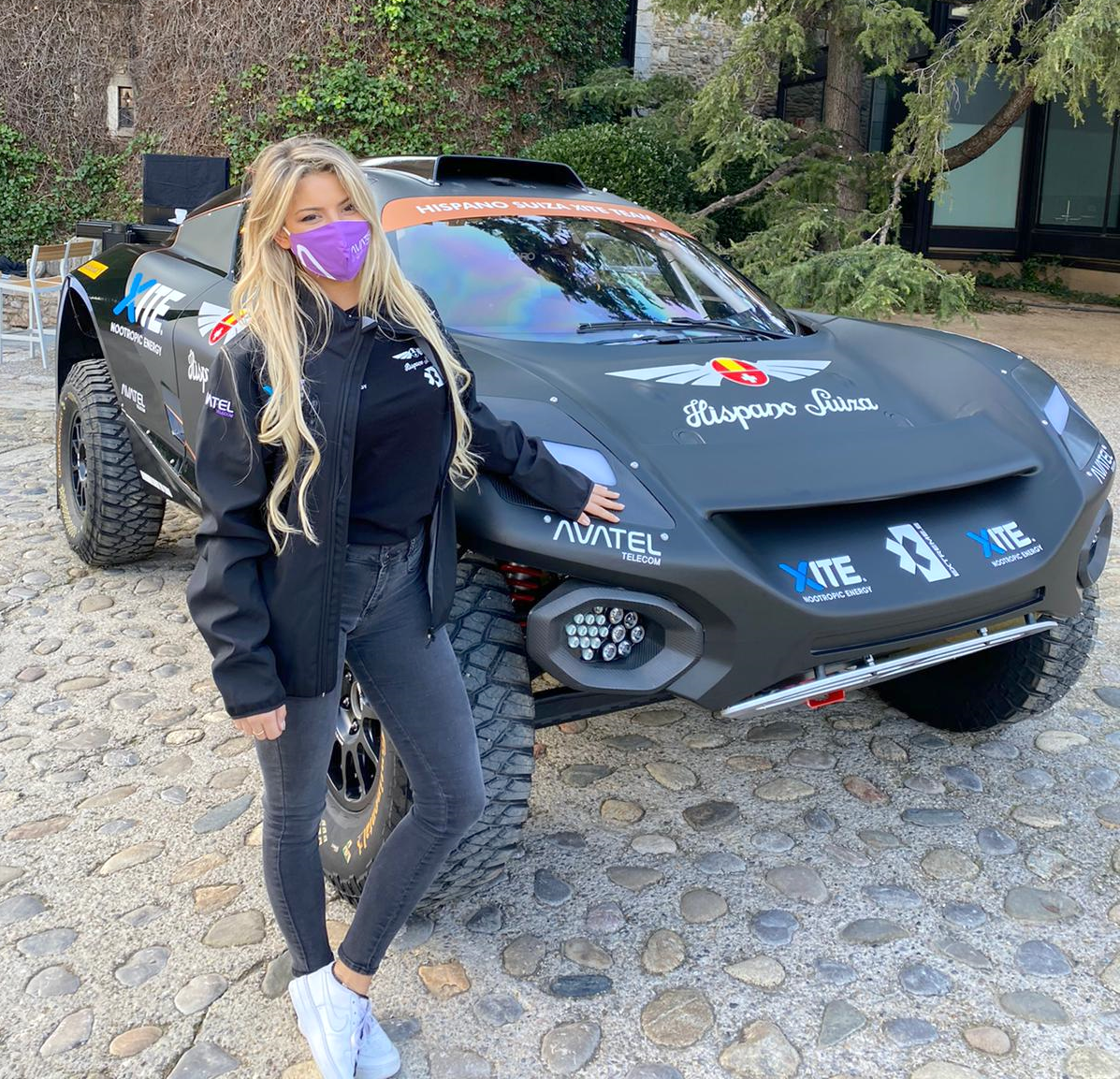
Christine GZ in 2020

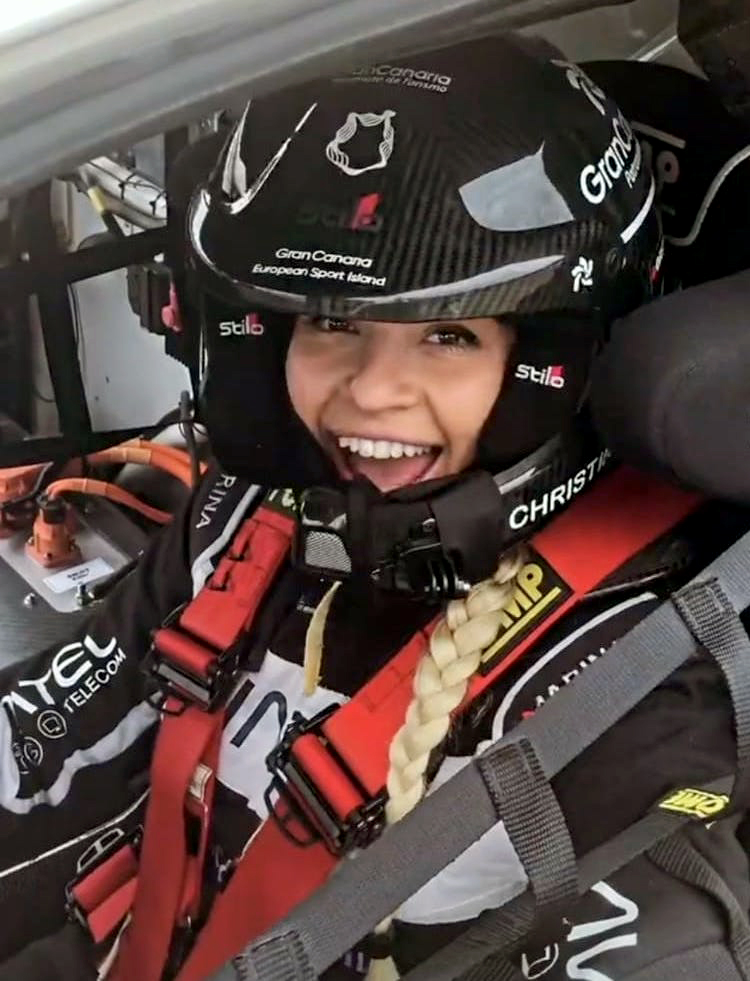
Christine GZ in 2021

GZ was born to Italian parents in Pondicherry, India, where she lived for eight years before moving to Milan, Italy, and then to Tenerife, Canary Islands. She completed a degree in motorsports technology at Birmingham City University.

She initially worked at her neighbour's garage. The first chassis she bought was a 1988 Golf MKII, followed by a 1989 Rally Corolla that she named "Lolla".

In 2016, she was a member of an all-female rally team competing in the Rally Catalunya.

In 2020, GZ re-launched her racing career after a COVID lockdown. Together with the Avatel Telecom and co-driver Edu Blanco she competed in the Andalucía Rally. Christine completed the rally with 3rd place. She was racing with the Avatel Telecom Racing Team during the 2021 season reaching 2nd place at the T1N Cross-Country Spanish Championship this year.

On 15 December 2020, she was announced to have signed with the formerly known Hispano Suiza now Xite Energy Team to compete in the new all-electric off-road racing championship Extreme E along with Oliver Bennett. She made her debut at the 2021 Desert X-Prix in Al-'Ula, Saudi Arabia, where she finished 5th. The team was re-branded Xite Energy Racing ahead of round 2. At the end of the 2021 season GZ and Bennett classified 9th. She also became a TV presenter for Italian broadcaster Sport MediaSet, covering the FIA Formula E World Championship and driving the BMW i8 Safety Car on the Circuit de Monaco. In addition, she also took part in the Eco Rallye Mallorca, driving the Porsche Taycan.

She participated in the Spanish date Baja Aragón of the FIA World Cup Cross-Country Bajas with her co-driver Ricardo Torlaschi finishing 5th at the T3 category.

She competed in the 2023 season of the all-electric off-road racing championship Extreme E for Carl Cox Motorsport with Timo Scheider as her teammate. She was replaced by Lia Block, daughter of the late Ken Block, at round 5 for the rest of the season. She returned for the final two rounds of the season as the series championship reserve driver after regular reserve driver Tamara Molinaro replaced Hedda Hosås at JBXE. She has previously competed for Veloce Racing and Xite Energy Racing. In September 2025, JBX (formerly JBXE) entered the FIA Extreme H World Cup with GZ and Tommi Hallman.

== Racing record ==
=== Complete Extreme E results ===
(key)

Year	Team	Car	1	2	3	4	5	6	7	8	9	10	Pos.	Points
2021	Hispano-Suiza Xite Energy Team	Spark ODYSSEY 21	DES; Q 5	DES; R 5									9th	55
2021	Xite Energy Racing	Spark ODYSSEY 21			OCE; Q 6	OCE; R 6	ARC; Q 9	ARC; R 8	ISL; Q 9	ISL; R 9	JUR; Q 9	JUR; R 9	9th	55
2022	Veloce Racing	Spark ODYSSEY 21	DES; WD	ISL1; 8	ISL2; 9	COP; 10	ENE						18th	7
2023	Carl Cox Motorsport	Spark ODYSSEY 21	DES; 1; 7	DES; 2; 9	HYD; 1; 3	HYD; 2 DNS	ISL1; 1	ISL1; 2	ISL2; 1	ISL2; 2	COP; 1	COP; 2	15th	23
2025	JBX powered by Team Monaco	Spark ODYSSEY 21	DES; 1; 6	DES; 2; 5									N/A	N/A
