= 2021 Desert X-Prix =

Round 1 of 5 of the 2021 Extreme E Championship
Next race →

Race details
- Date: 3–4 April 2021
- Location: Al-'Ula, Saudi Arabia
- Course: Sand, rocks
- Course length: 8.8 km (5.4 miles)
- Distance: 2 laps, 17.6 km (10.9 miles)

Pole position
Drivers	(France) Sébastien Loeb; (Spain) Cristina Gutiérrez	Team X44
- Time: 21:55.998

Podium
First	(Sweden) Johan Kristoffersson; (Australia) Molly Taylor	Rosberg X Racing
Second	(Sweden) Timmy Hansen; (United Kingdom) Catie Munnings	Andretti United XE
Third	(France) Sébastien Loeb; (Spain) Cristina Gutiérrez	Team X44

The 2021 Desert X-Prix was an Extreme E off-road race that was held on 3 and 4 April 2021 in Al-'Ula, Saudi Arabia. It was the first Championship round of the electric off-road racing car series' inaugural season. The final was won by Johan Kristoffersson and Molly Taylor for the Rosberg X Racing team, ahead of Andretti United Extreme E and Team X44.

== Classification ==
=== Qualifying ===
Pos.	No.	Team	Drivers	Q1		Q2		Total		Gap	Points
Pos.	No.	Team	Drivers	Laps	Time	Laps	Time	Laps	Time	Gap	Points
1	44	(United Kingdom) Team X44	(France) Sébastien Loeb (Spain) Cristina Gutiérrez	2	10:48.067	2	11:07.931	4	21:55.998		12
2	55	(Spain) Acciona | Sainz XE Team	(Spain) Carlos Sainz (Spain) Laia Sanz	2	11:16.231	2	11:20.864	4	22:37.095	+41.097	11
3	6	(Germany) Rosberg X Racing	(Sweden) Johan Kristoffersson (Australia) Molly Taylor	2	10:43.565	2	12:03.258	4	22:46.823	+50.825	10
4	23	(United States) Andretti United Extreme E	(Sweden) Timmy Hansen (United Kingdom) Catie Munnings	2	11:31.603	2	11:32.931	4	23:04.534	+1:08.536	9
5	42	(Spain) Hispano Suiza Xite Energy Team	(Spain) Christine Giampaoli Zonca (United Kingdom) Oliver Bennett	2	13:09.038	2	12:01.694	4	25:10.732	+3:14.734	8
6	22	(United Kingdom) JBXE	(United Kingdom) Jenson Button (Sweden) Mikaela Åhlin-Kottulinsky	2	12:22.426	2	14:02.952	4	26:25.378	+4:29.380	7
7	99	(United States) Segi TV Chip Ganassi Racing	(United States) Kyle LeDuc (United States) Sara Price	2	13:33.674	0	No time	2	13:33.674	+2 laps	6
8	125	(Germany) Abt Cupra XE	(Sweden) Mattias Ekström (Germany) Claudia Hürtgen	1	4:42.210	0	No time	1	4:42.210	+3 laps	5
9	5	(United Kingdom) Veloce Racing	(France) Stéphane Sarrazin (United Kingdom) Jamie Chadwick	0	No time	0	No time	0	No time	+4 laps	4

Key
Colour	Advance to
Black	Semi-Final
Silver	Crazy Race
Bronze	Shootout
Gold	Final

Position	1	2	3	4	5	6	7	8	9	10
Points	12	11	10	9	8	7	6	5	4	3

=== Semi-final ===
Pos.	No.	Team	Drivers	Laps	Time	Points
1	6	(Germany) Rosberg X Racing	(Sweden) Johan Kristoffersson (Australia) Molly Taylor	2	11:12.950	
2	44	(United Kingdom) Team X44	(France) Sébastien Loeb (Spain) Cristina Gutiérrez	2	+28.910	
3	55	(Spain) Acciona | Sainz XE Team	(Spain) Carlos Sainz (Spain) Laia Sanz	2	+1:06.828	15

=== Crazy Race ===
Pos.	No.	Team	Drivers	Laps	Time	Points
1	23	(United States) Andretti United Extreme E	(Sweden) Timmy Hansen (United Kingdom) Catie Munnings	2	11:30.564	
2	42	(Spain) Hispano Suiza Xite Energy Team	(United Kingdom) Oliver Bennett (Spain) Christine Giampaoli Zonca	2	+30.342	12
3	22	(United Kingdom) JBXE	(United Kingdom) Jenson Button (Sweden) Mikaela Åhlin-Kottulinsky	2	+1:06.662	10

=== Shootout ===
Pos.	No.	Team	Drivers	Laps	Time	Points
1	125	(Germany) Abt Cupra XE	(Sweden) Mattias Ekström (Germany) Claudia Hürtgen	1^{1}	5:07.187	8
2	99	(United States) Segi TV Chip Ganassi Racing	(United States) Sara Price (United States) Kyle LeDuc	1^{1}	+21.716	5^{2}
WD	5	(United Kingdom) Veloce Racing	(France) Stéphane Sarrazin (United Kingdom) Jamie Chadwick	0	Withdrew	-

Notes:

- ^1 – Retired after crashing on lap 2.
- ^2 – Chip Ganassi Racing and Kyle LeDuc received a 1 championship point penalty for causing a collision.

=== Final ===
Pos.	No.	Team	Drivers	Laps	Time	Points
1	6	(Germany) Rosberg X Racing	(Sweden) Johan Kristoffersson (Australia) Molly Taylor	2	11:29.746	25
2	23	(United States) Andretti United Extreme E	(Sweden) Timmy Hansen (United Kingdom) Catie Munnings	2	+23.736	19
3	44	(United Kingdom) Team X44	(France) Sébastien Loeb (Spain) Cristina Gutiérrez	2	+1:38.098	18

Position	1	2	3
Points	25	19	18

Previous race: N/A	Extreme E Championship; 2021 season	Next race: 2021 Ocean X-Prix
Previous race: N/A	Desert X-Prix	Next race: 2022 Desert X-Prix
