= 2019 Americas Rallycross Championship =

The 2019 Americas Rallycross Championship was the second and final season of the Americas Rallycross Championship, a feeder championship to the FIA World Rallycross Championship representing North America. The season consists of six rounds across two categories; Supercar and ARX2. The season commenced on 8 June at the Mid-Ohio Sports Car Course in Lexington, Ohio and finished on the 6 October at the same location.

The series folded after the 2019 season.

== Calendar ==
The calendar was unveiled on 31 January 2019.

Rnd	Event	Date	Venue	Class	Winner	Team
1	(United States) ARX of Mid-Ohio	8–9 June	Mid-Ohio Sports Car Course, Lexington	Supercar	(United States) Scott Speed	(United States) Subaru Rally Team USA
1	(United States) ARX of Mid-Ohio	8–9 June	Mid-Ohio Sports Car Course, Lexington	ARX2 (Day 1)	(United States) Alex Keyes	(United States) Racing4Detroit
1	(United States) ARX of Mid-Ohio	8–9 June	Mid-Ohio Sports Car Course, Lexington	ARX2 (Day 2)	(Jamaica) Fraser McConnell	(United States) Dirtfish
1	(United States) ARX of Mid-Ohio	8–9 June	Mid-Ohio Sports Car Course, Lexington	ARX3 (Day 1)	(Australia) John McInnes	(United States) SIERRA
1	(United States) ARX of Mid-Ohio	8–9 June	Mid-Ohio Sports Car Course, Lexington	ARX3 (Day 2)	(Australia) John McInnes	(United States) SIERRA
2	(United States) ARX of Gateway	13 July	World Wide Technology Raceway at Gateway, Madison	Supercar	(Australia) Chris Atkinson	(United States) Subaru Rally Team USA
2	(United States) ARX of Gateway	13 July	World Wide Technology Raceway at Gateway, Madison	ARX2	(United States) Conner Martell	(United States) Dreyer & Reinbold Racing
2	(United States) ARX of Gateway	13 July	World Wide Technology Raceway at Gateway, Madison	ARX3	(United States) Blake "Bilko" Williams	(United States) SIERRA
3	(United States) ARX of Gateway	14 July	World Wide Technology Raceway at Gateway, Madison	Supercar	(Sweden) Patrik Sandell	(United States) Subaru Rally Team USA
3	(United States) ARX of Gateway	14 July	World Wide Technology Raceway at Gateway, Madison	ARX2	(United States) Conner Martell	(United States) Dreyer & Reinbold Racing
3	(United States) ARX of Gateway	14 July	World Wide Technology Raceway at Gateway, Madison	ARX3	(United States) Blake "Bilko" Williams	(United States) SIERRA
4	ARX of Canada	3–4 August	Circuit Trois-Rivières, Trois-Rivières	Supercar	(United States) Tanner Foust	(United States) Volkswagen Andretti Rallycross
4	ARX of Canada	3–4 August	Circuit Trois-Rivières, Trois-Rivières	ARX2 (Day 1)	(Jamaica) Fraser McConnell	(United States) Dirtfish
4	ARX of Canada	3–4 August	Circuit Trois-Rivières, Trois-Rivières	ARX2 (Day 2)	(Jamaica) Fraser McConnell	(United States) Dirtfish
5	(United States) ARX of Austin	28 September	Circuit of the Americas, Austin	Supercar	(United States) Tanner Foust	(United States) Volkswagen Andretti Rallycross
5	(United States) ARX of Austin	28 September	Circuit of the Americas, Austin	ARX2	(Jamaica) Fraser McConnell	(United States) Dirtfish
5	(United States) ARX of Austin	28 September	Circuit of the Americas, Austin	ARX3	(United States) Dave Carapetyan	(United States) SIERRA
6	(United States) ARX of Mid-Ohio	5–6 October	Mid-Ohio Sports Car Course, Lexington	Supercar	(Australia) Chris Atkinson	(United States) Subaru Rally Team USA
6	(United States) ARX of Mid-Ohio	5–6 October	Mid-Ohio Sports Car Course, Lexington	ARX2 (Day 1)	(United States) Sage Karam	(United States) Dreyer & Reinbold Racing
6	(United States) ARX of Mid-Ohio	5–6 October	Mid-Ohio Sports Car Course, Lexington	ARX2 (Day 2)	(Jamaica) Fraser McConnell	(United States) Dirtfish
6	(United States) ARX of Mid-Ohio	5–6 October	Mid-Ohio Sports Car Course, Lexington	ARX3 (Day 1)	(United States) Keegan Kincaid	(United States) SIERRA
6	(United States) ARX of Mid-Ohio	5–6 October	Mid-Ohio Sports Car Course, Lexington	ARX3 (Day 2)	(United States) Keegan Kincaid	(United States) SIERRA

=== Calendar changes ===
- The calendar was expanded from four rounds to six, with the inclusion of two rounds at Mid-Ohio and a double-header at Gateway.
- The round supporting the World RX of Great Britain was dropped.
- The ARX of COTA was rebranded as the ARX of Austin and was moved from July to September to replace the cancelled FIA World Rallycross Championship round.
- The ARX of Canada will run in conjunction with FIA World Rallycross Championship once again.

== Entries ==
=== Supercar ===
Constructor	Entrant	Car	No.	Drivers	Rounds
Ford	(United States) Loenbro Motorsports	Ford Fiesta ST	00	(Canada) Steve Arpin	All
Ford	(United States) Loenbro Motorsports	Ford Fiesta ST	3	(United States) Travis PeCoy	All
Subaru	(United States) Subaru Motorsports USA	Subaru WRX STI	13	(Norway) Andreas Bakkerud	5–6
Subaru	(United States) Subaru Motorsports USA	Subaru WRX STI	18	(Sweden) Patrik Sandell	All
Subaru	(United States) Subaru Motorsports USA	Subaru WRX STI	31	(Finland) Joni Wiman	5–6
Subaru	(United States) Subaru Motorsports USA	Subaru WRX STI	41	(United States) Scott Speed	1–4
Subaru	(United States) Subaru Motorsports USA	Subaru WRX STI	55	(Australia) Chris Atkinson	All
Volkswagen	(United States) Volkswagen Andretti Rallycross	Volkswagen Beetle	02	(United States) Cabot Bigham	All
Volkswagen	(United States) Volkswagen Andretti Rallycross	Volkswagen Beetle	34	(United States) Tanner Foust	All

=== ARX2 ===
Constructor	Entrant	Car	No.	Drivers	Rounds
OMSE	(United States) Racing4Detroit	Olsbergs MSE RX2	4	(United States) Alex Keyes	1–4, 7–9
OMSE	(United States) Loenbro Motorsports	Olsbergs MSE RX2	09	(United States) Michael Leach	3–9
OMSE	(United States) Dreyer & Reinbold Racing	Olsbergs MSE RX2	21	(United States) Conner Martell	3–9
OMSE	(United States) Dreyer & Reinbold Racing	Olsbergs MSE RX2	24	(United States) Sage Karam	1–2, 7–9
OMSE	(United States) Dreyer & Reinbold Racing	Olsbergs MSE RX2	28	(United States) Gray Leadbetter	All
OMSE	(United States) Dreyer & Reinbold Racing	Olsbergs MSE RX2	48	(United States) J. R. Hildebrand	1–4
OMSE	(United States) Dreyer & Reinbold Racing	Olsbergs MSE RX2	53	(United States) Cole Keatts	All
OMSE	(United States) Dreyer & Reinbold Racing	Olsbergs MSE RX2	55	(United States) Lane Vacala	5–9
OMSE	(United States) Dirtfish	Olsbergs MSE RX2	35	(Jamaica) Fraser McConnell	All
OMSE	(United States) Dirtfish	Olsbergs MSE RX2	70	(United States) Brad Deberti	1–4, 7

=== ARX3 ===
Constructor	Entrant	Car	No.	Drivers	Rounds
SIERRA	(United States) SIERRA	SIERRA RX3	1	(United States) Bill Shuster	All
SIERRA	(United States) SIERRA	SIERRA RX3	2	(United States) Aaron Kaufman	1–4
SIERRA	(United States) SIERRA	SIERRA RX3	3	(United States) Jim Jonsin	1–2
SIERRA	(United States) SIERRA	SIERRA RX3	4	(Australia) John McInnes	All
SIERRA	(United States) SIERRA	SIERRA RX3	5	(United States) James Kirkham	1–4
SIERRA	(United States) SIERRA	SIERRA RX3	6	(United States) Dave Wallingford	1–2
SIERRA	(United States) SIERRA	SIERRA RX3	8	(United States) Michael Leach	2
SIERRA	(United States) SIERRA	SIERRA RX3	15	(Australia) Clay Note	5
SIERRA	(United States) SIERRA	SIERRA RX3	21	(United States) Dave Carapetyan	5
SIERRA	(United States) SIERRA	SIERRA RX3	22	(United States) Blake "Bilko" Williams	3–4
SIERRA	(United States) SIERRA	SIERRA RX3	25	(United States) Dylan Towne	5
SIERRA	(United States) SIERRA	SIERRA RX3	31	(United States) Tommy Boileau	3–7
SIERRA	(United States) SIERRA	SIERRA RX3	41	(United States) Keegan Kincaid	6–7
SIERRA	(United States) SIERRA	SIERRA RX3	43	(United States) Steve Burns	5–7
SIERRA	(United States) SIERRA	SIERRA RX3	49	(United States) Justin Peck	5

==== Driver Changes ====
- Scott Speed moved from Volkswagen Andretti Rallycross to Subaru Rally Team USA
- Cabot Bigham moved from Dreyer & Reinbold Racing in ARX2 to Volkswagen Andretti Rallycross to replace Speed.
- Steve Arpin left Hoonigan Racing Division to start his own team, Loenbro Motorsports.
- Travis PeCoy moved from Dreyer & Reinbold Racing in ARX2 to Loenbro Motorsports.

== Results and standings ==
Championship points are scored as follows:

	Position															
Round	1st	2nd	3rd	4th	5th	6th	7th	8th	9th	10th	11th	12th	13th	14th	15th	16th
Heats	16	15	14	13	12	11	10	9	8	7	6	5	4	3	2	1
Semi-Finals	6	5	4	3	2	1										
Final	8	5	4	3	2	1										

- A red background denotes drivers who did not advance from the round

=== Supercar ===
Pos.	Driver	MO1 (United States)	GTW (United States)		CAN (Canada)	COT (United States)	MO2 (United States)	Points
1	(United States) Tanner Foust	4	6	3	1	1	7	143
2	(Australia) Chris Atkinson	6	1	4	4	5	1	131
3	(Sweden) Patrik Sandell	5	3	1	7	2	3	130
4	(Canada) Steve Arpin	3	2	5	6	3	2	124
5	(United States) Travis PeCoy	2	5	6	5	8	5	104
6	(United States) Scott Speed	1	4	2	3			100
7	(United States) Cabot Bigham	7	7	7	2	6	8	94
8	(Norway) Andreas Bakkerud					4	6	44
9	(Finland) Joni Wiman					7	4	36
Pos.	Driver	MO1 (United States)	GTW (United States)		CAN (Canada)	COT (United States)	MO2 (United States)	Points

Colour	Result
Gold	Winner
Silver	Second place
Bronze	Third place
Green	Points classification
Blue	Non-points classification
Blue	Non-classified finish (NC)
Purple	Retired, not classified (Ret)
Red	Did not qualify (DNQ)
Red	Did not pre-qualify (DNPQ)
Black	Disqualified (DSQ)
White	Did not start (DNS)
White	Withdrew (WD)
White	Race cancelled (C)
Blank	Did not practice (DNP)
Blank	Did not arrive (DNA)
Blank	Excluded (EX)

=== ARX2 ===
Pos.	Driver	MO1 (United States)		GTW (United States)		CAN (Canada)		COT (United States)	MO2 (United States)		Points
1	(Jamaica) Fraser McConnell	6	1	7	2	1	1	1	5	1	219
2	(United States) Cole Keatts	5	6	2	5	3	3	6	2	4	186
3	(United States) Conner Martell			1	1	2	2	3	4	7	155
4	(United States) Alex Keyes	1	3	5	6			4	3	3	139
5	(United States) Gray Leadbetter	7	5	8	7	4	4	5	7	8	132
6	(United States) Sage Karam	2	2					2	1	2	129
7	(United States) Brad Deberti	3	7	4	3			7			95
8	(United States) Michael Leach			6	8	5	6	8	8	5	93
9	(United States) J. R. Hildebrand	4	4	3	4						79
10	(United States) Lane Vacala					6	5	9	6	6	71
Pos.	Driver	MO1 (United States)		GTW (United States)		CAN (Canada)		COT (United States)	MO2 (United States)		Points

=== ARX3 ===
Pos.	Driver	MO1 (United States)		GTW (United States)		COT (United States)	MO2 (United States)		Points
1	(Australia) John McInnes	1	1	5	6	2	4	4	121
2	(United States) Bill Shuster	5	7	3	4	5	2	3	113
3	(United States) Tommy Boileau			2	2	4	3	2	94
4	(United States) James Kirkham	6	2	4	3				68
5	(United States) Aaron Kaufman	4	6	6	5				55
6	(United States) Keegan Kincaid						1	1	48
7	(United States) Blake "Bilko" Williams			1	1				46
8	(United States) Jim Jonsin	2	3						38
9	(United States) Steve Burns					8	5	5	37
10	(United States) Dave Wallingford	3	5						33
11	(United States) Dave Carapetyan					1			24
12	(United States) Dylan Towne					3			19
13	(United States) Michael Leach		4						14
14	(United States) Justin Peck					6			13
15	(Australia) Clay Note					7			10
Pos.	Driver	MO1 (United States)		GTW (United States)		COT (United States)	MO2 (United States)		Points
