= WRC2 =

Rallying championship series

- Category: Group Rally2
- Country: International
- Inaugural season: 2013
- Tire suppliers: H
- Drivers' champion: (Estonia) Robert Virves (2026)
- Co-Drivers' champion: (Estonia) Jakko Viilo (2026)
- Teams' champion: (Italy) Lancia Corse HF (2026)
- Official website: www.wrc.com

The FIA WRC2 is a support championship of the World Rally Championship (WRC). The calendar consists of the same rallies and stages as the parent series and crews usually compete immediately after Rally1 class crews. WRC2 is limited to production-based cars homologated under Group Rally2 (or previous R5) rules. There are separate specific championship titles awarded to Teams, Drivers and Co-Drivers (including titles for Challengers in 2023, previously for Juniors under 30 years old).

WRC2 began in 2013, replacing the Super 2000 World Rally Championship (SWRC) as the series performance car based championship in a rearrangement of the WRC support categories that also saw the existing Production car World Rally Championship (PWRC) and WRC Academy make way for WRC3 and Junior WRC.

== History ==
In early 2012, the FIA annulled the contract in place with WRC's promotor North One Sports following its owners collapse into administration. After a tender process, the FIA World Motor Sport Council approved a new promotor in September of that year, a collaboration between Sportsman Media and Red Bull, with responsibility for all commercial matters of the championship, with power to assist in forming the calendar and proposing new rallies, and suggesting altering of rules and regulations and structure of the championships. It was also announced that another WRC tenderer, Eurosport Events, then the promotor and owner of the Intercontinental Rally Challenge (IRC), would become the promotor of a revamped FIA European Rally Championship from 2013. The IRC was a challenger series to the WRC in global rallying and ceased at the end of 2012.

At the same September WMSC meeting, the FIA announced changes to the WRC's support championships in order "to reflect the interests and demands of the competitors", with WRC2 and WRC3 replacing SWRC and PWRC. Unlike the old, the new support championships were not world championships in their own right, beholden to FIA International Sporting Code rules applicable to championships including the word world in their titles. These rules influenced the make up of the calendar and commitment from the entrants. For this reason it is asserted that WRC2 cannot be an acronym for World Rally Championship 2 and its champions are not world champions. Indeed, in 2013 and 2014, World Rally Championship 2 was officially used only once in the sporting regulations, and since 2015 has not been used by either the FIA or its promotor.

=== WRC 2 (2013–2018) ===
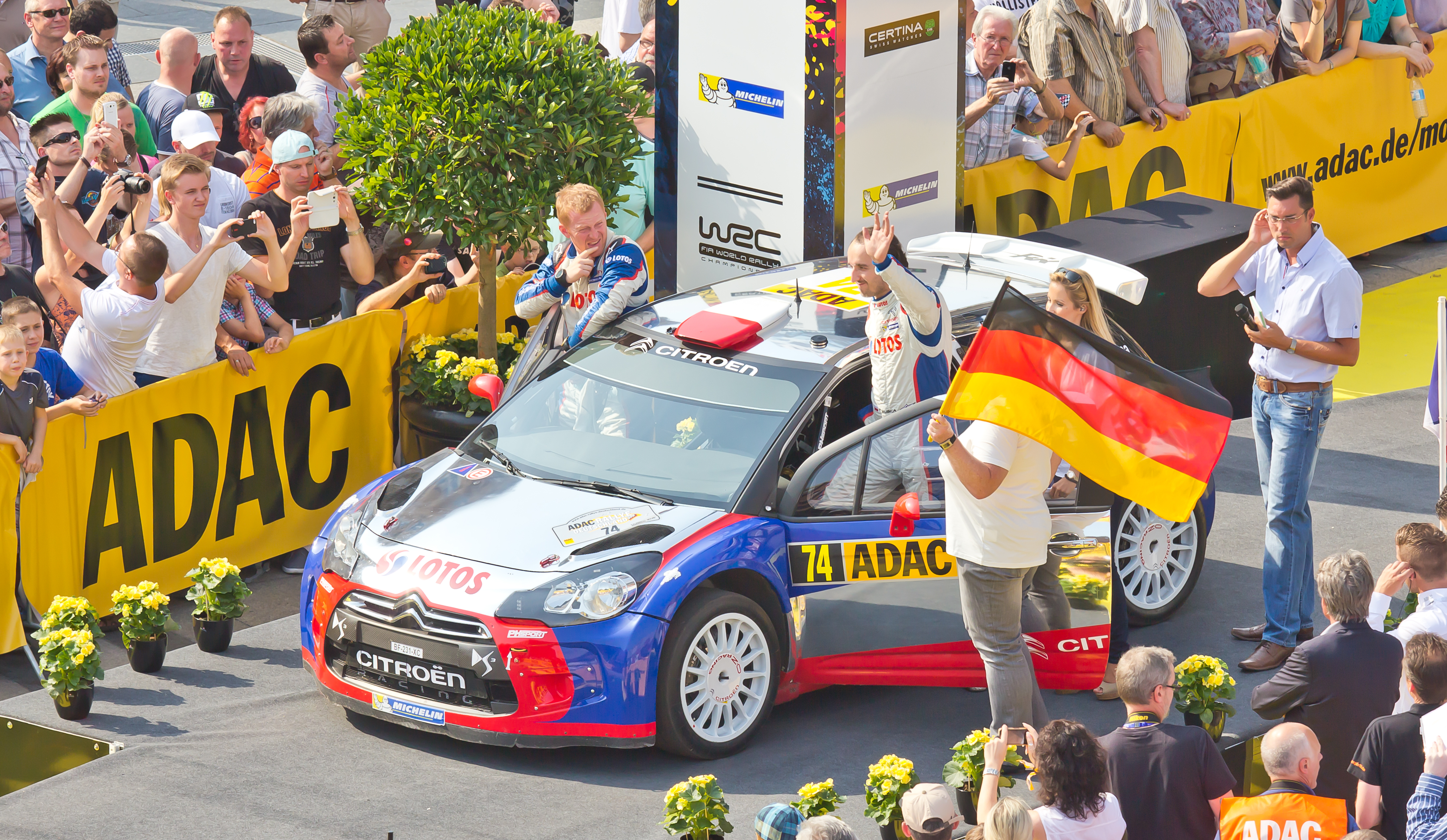
2013 champions Robert Kubica and Maciek Baran, Citroen DS3 RRC, Rallye Deutschland 2013

In the new WRC2 of 2013, entrants could nominate round-by-round for the first time which rallies they would be competing in and could choose any rally included in the WRC calendar with no minimum commitment or any requirement to compete in rallies outside Europe. By the end of the first season, it was noted by the FIA that the support championships were more popular than ever. Thirteen drivers scored championship points in 2012's SWRC, compared to 36 in 2013's WRC2.

With the introduction of the R5 in Group R in 2013, the eligibility of the SWRC was extended to allow R5 and four wheel drive Group N cars into WRC2, alongside Super-2000, Regional Rally Cars (RRC) and R4. This essentially merged the four-wheel drive and performance cars of PWRC and SWRC back into one competition whilst WRC3 championship was for two wheel drive cars. Between 2013 and 2015 two additional cup titles were also contested by those driving Group N cars, WRC 2 Production Car Cup for Drivers and Co-Drivers.

=== Overhaul of the WRC support championships (2019–2021) ===
Changes to the structure of the WRC support championships were made by the FIA ahead of the 2019 season, coinciding with approval and implementation of a new rally pyramid that emphasised tiers of corresponding numbers of classes, cars and competitions.

The eligibility rules of WRC 2 were changed so that only R5 cars could enter in 2019. Further, Super-2000, Group N and R4 could no longer enter the WRC at all. Simultaneously, the R5 class was renamed Rally2, which appeared in official regulations from 2020.

Meanwhile, the existing WRC 3 championship for two-wheel drive cars ceased after 2018, and WRC 2 was split into a championship for manufacturer teams called WRC 2 Pro; and a championship for privateer driver entries, which retained the name WRC 2.

==== WRC 2 Pro (2019) ====
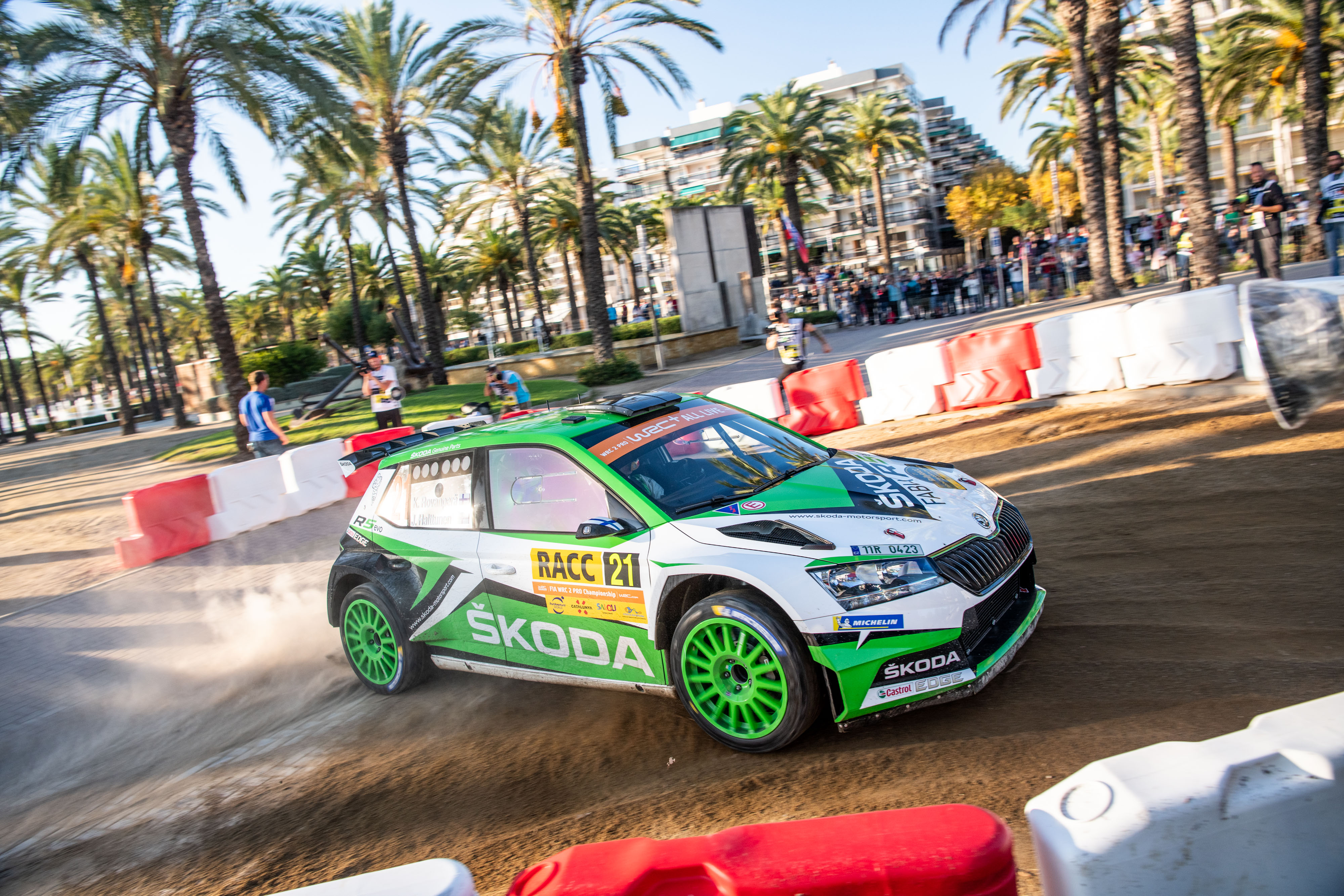
Kalle Rovanperä and Jonne Halttunen in WRC 2 Pro, Rally Spain 2019

WRC 2 Pro was introduced in 2019 as a means of encouraging manufacturer entries to join the category and in response to complaints that privateers could not compete with the resources of the factory teams. Entirely separate manufacturer, driver and co-driver championships were created. Competing in cars built to R5 specifications, manufacturer teams were permitted to enter up to two crews per event. Entries had to contest a minimum of eight rallies, including one outside Europe. Only the eight best results would contribute to the championship.

The WRC 2 Pro series was abandoned after only one year following criticism that the structure was too difficult to understand. Also, no new manufacturers had been attracted as desired. Of the three 2019 entrants, M-Sport Ford and Citroën had free entry courtesy of being in the WRC Manufacturer's championship. Somewhat against the intentions of the two championships, M-Sport Ford nominated customer owner-drivers whilst Citroën nominated an independent team, PH Sport, to run their entry with a customer driver. Conversely, M-Sport Ford and Škoda were supporting Eric Camilli and Fabian Kreim respectively as privateer entries in the privateer oriented WRC 2.

Škoda, the only paying entrant and victor, withdrew from entering WRC from 2020, instead supporting Toksport entries. However, it is not clear if Škoda's withdrawal was the cause of, effect of, or related to any changes in the championships.

==== Revival of one WRC2 and WRC3 (2020–2021) ====
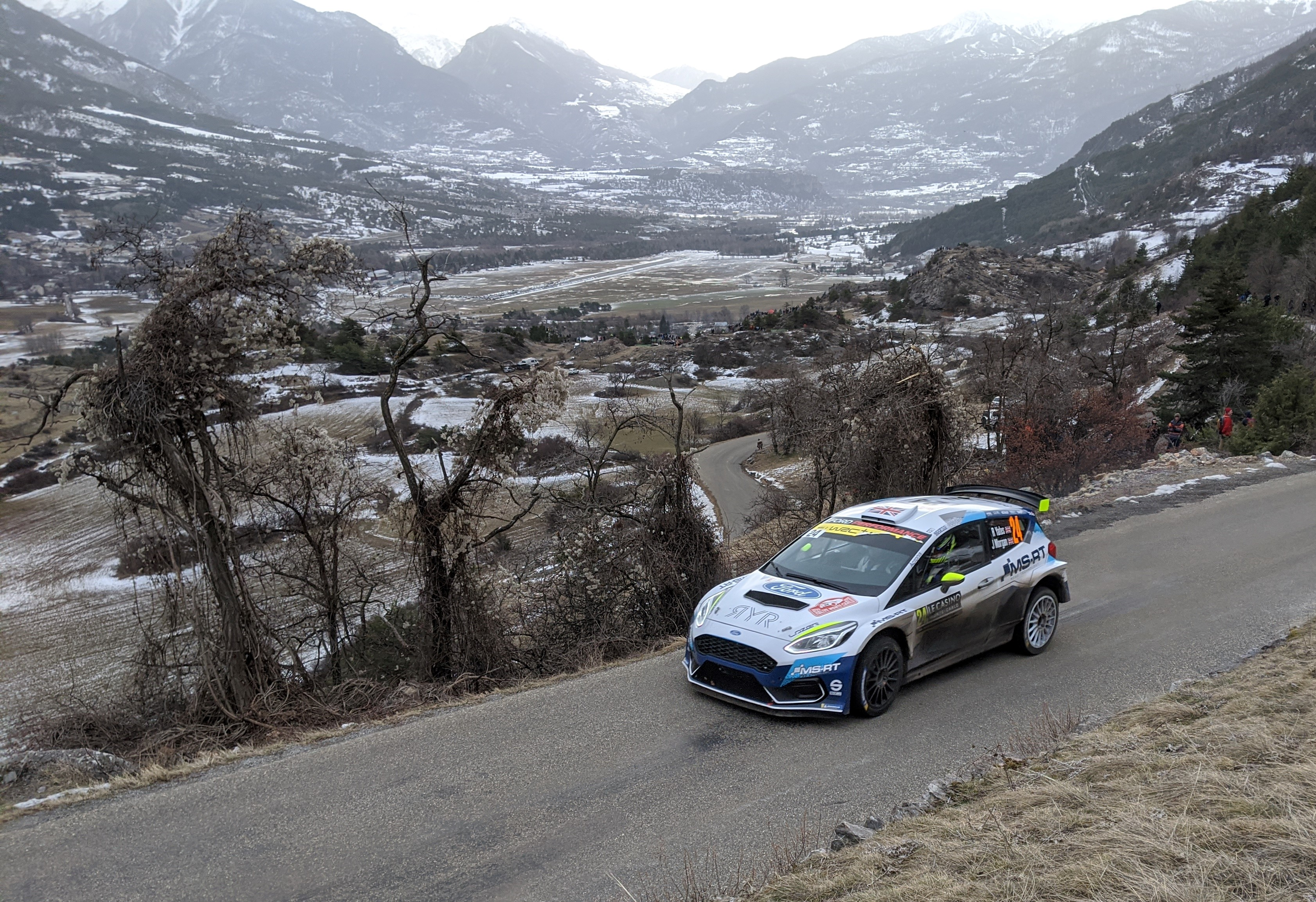
Ford Fiesta Rally2, 2020

From 2020 to 2021, WRC2 was for manufacturer and independent teams approved by the FIA. Privateer drivers could only enter a new version of WRC3 for Rally2 cars in 2020 and 2021, which included budget restraints and restrictions on who could enter based on previous successes.

The rally results service eWRC-Results advocates for the purpose of stats and comparison, that WRC3 in these years is a continuation of the 2019 WRC2 series, with the 2019 WRC 2 Pro being the origin of a new championship which became WRC2 in these years. However this method of thinking would place the winner of four WRC 2 Teams Championships from 2015 to 2018, the manufacturer Škoda, in the privateer continuation. It also doesn't account for the merge of the championships from 2022.

=== One Rally2 support series (2022–) ===
Following the launch of Group Rally3 cars in 2021, the 2022 WRC3 Championship became exclusively for those cars. WRC2 expanded to allow privateer drivers of Rally2 cars. Specific WRC2 championship titles for Juniors and cup titles for Masters were also created, although the WRC2 Masters category would be replaced by a WRC Masters Cup in 2023.

In 2026, Lancia returned to compete in the World Rally Championship after more than 30 years and, in particular, for the first time in WRC2, a category that did not exist before during its participation in the World Rally Championship.

=== Evolution of eligibility ===
Evolution of WRC Support Championships Eligibility
Drivetrain	Class in 2014 (Note: A different class system was used in 2013)	Group	2013	2014	2015	2016	2017	2018	2019	2020	2021	2022	2023	2024	2025	Class in 2025
4WD	RC2	R5/Rally2	WRC2						WRC2 Pro	WRC2						RC2
4WD	RC2	R5/Rally2	WRC2						WRC2	WRC3						—N/a
4WD	RC2	Super 2000	WRC2						(Ineligible for WRC)							—N/a
4WD	RC2	R4 (Note: Not eligible within Europe from 2015)	WRC2						(Ineligible for WRC)							—N/a
4WD	RC2	Group N	WRC2						(Ineligible for WRC)							—N/a
4WD	—N/a	Rally3										WRC3				RC3
2WD	RC3	R2C & R3	WRC3						(Eligible for WRC only)							RC4
2WD	RC4	R2B	WRC3						(Eligible for WRC only)							RC4
2WD	RC5	R1	WRC3						(Eligible for WRC only)							RC5

Evolution of entry eligibility of R5/Rally2
Entry by	2013	2014	2015	2016	2017	2018	2019	2020	2021	2022	2023	2024	2025
Manufacturers	WRC2						WRC2 Pro	WRC2		WRC2			
Teams	WRC2						none	WRC2		WRC2			
Privateers	WRC2						WRC2	WRC3		WRC2			

== Rules ==
In the 2023 season teams and individuals may enter WRC2. To score in the WRC2 Championship for Teams on any rally teams must enter and start with two cars. Teams may enter a maximum of 6 rallies in Europe with the best 5 results contributing to the championship points. Teams are also permitted to enter a seventh rally outside Europe for bonus points.

Drivers and/or Co-Drivers must enter a maximum 7 rallies and the best 6 results contribute to championship points. Drivers will be considered as a Challenger (thus eligible for the Challenger championships) if they have not previously won WRC2 or WRC3 in a Rally2 car or scored WRC Manufacturer points. Power Stage points are awarded to the fastest three drivers, on a 3, 2 then 1 point basis.

Teams, drivers and co-drivers need to indicate on the entry form for each rally if they intend to nominate it as one of their scoring rounds. For this reason (and the requirement for teams to enter two cars), it is not unusual for teams, drivers and co-drivers to enter multiple rounds yet nominate and score points in different rounds to each other. Prior to the introduction of nominated events, the first 7 results counted which may have encouraged non-participation on certain events.

== Eligible models ==
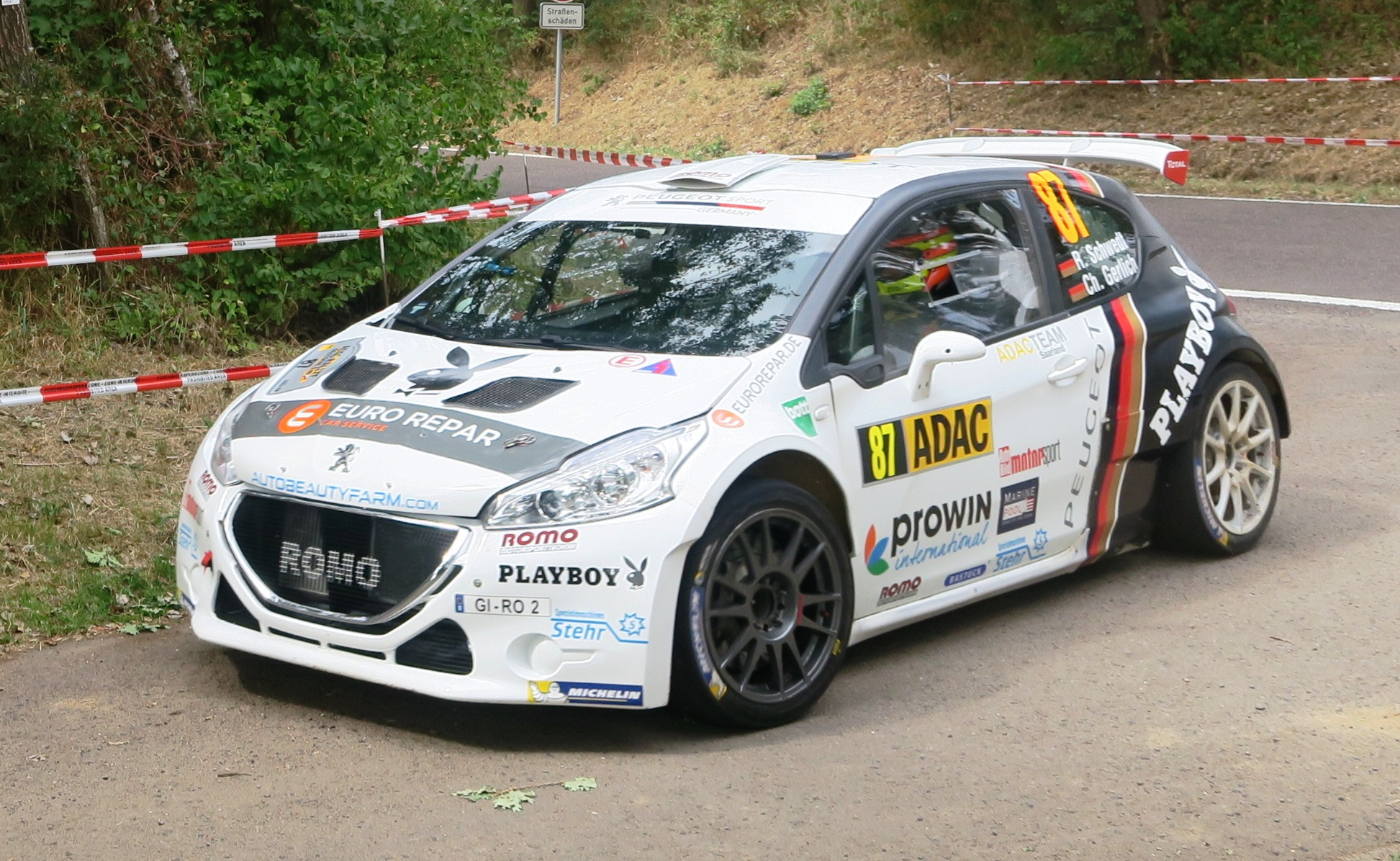
Peugeot 208 T16 R5

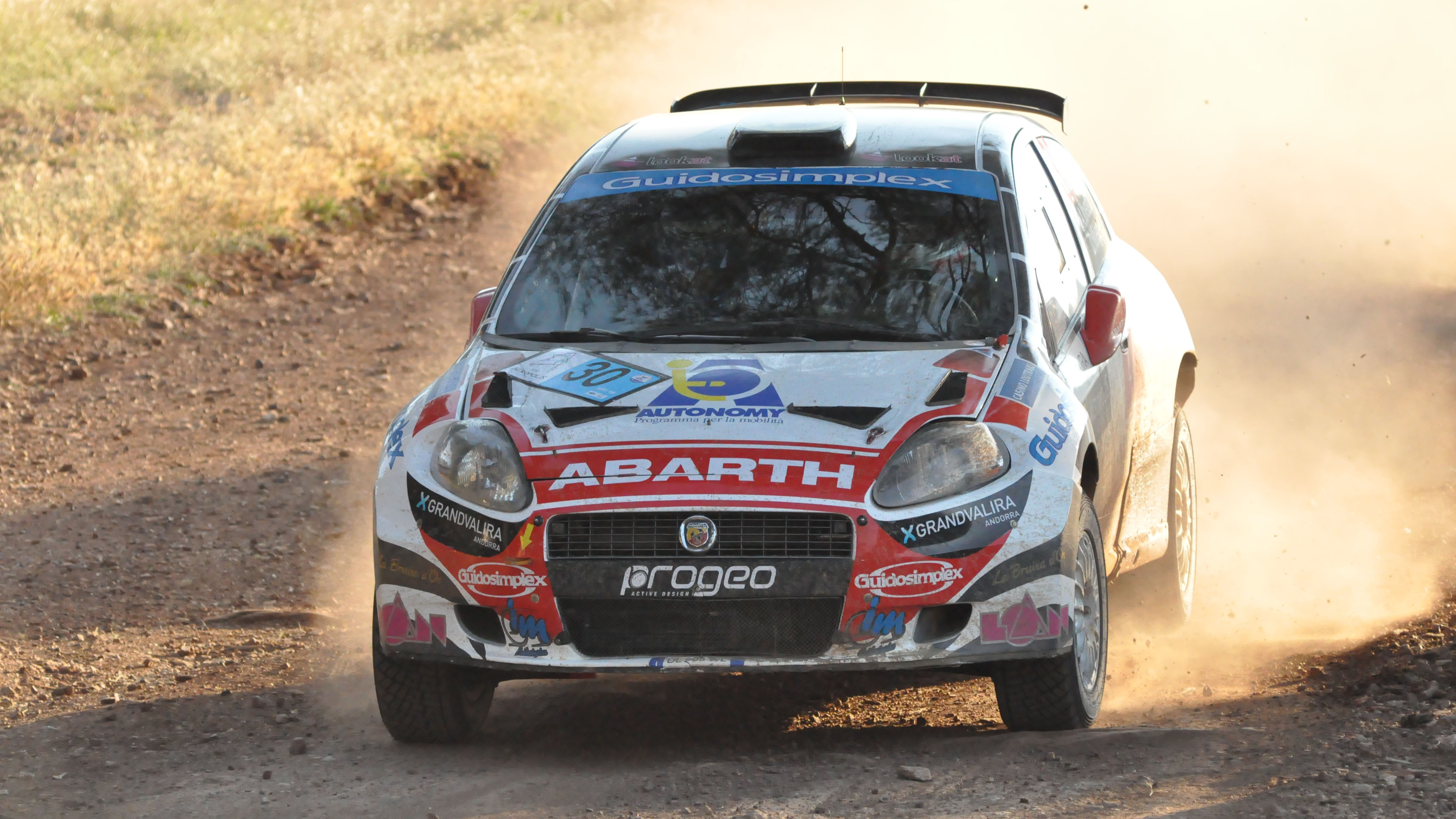
Fiat Grande Punto Abarth S2000

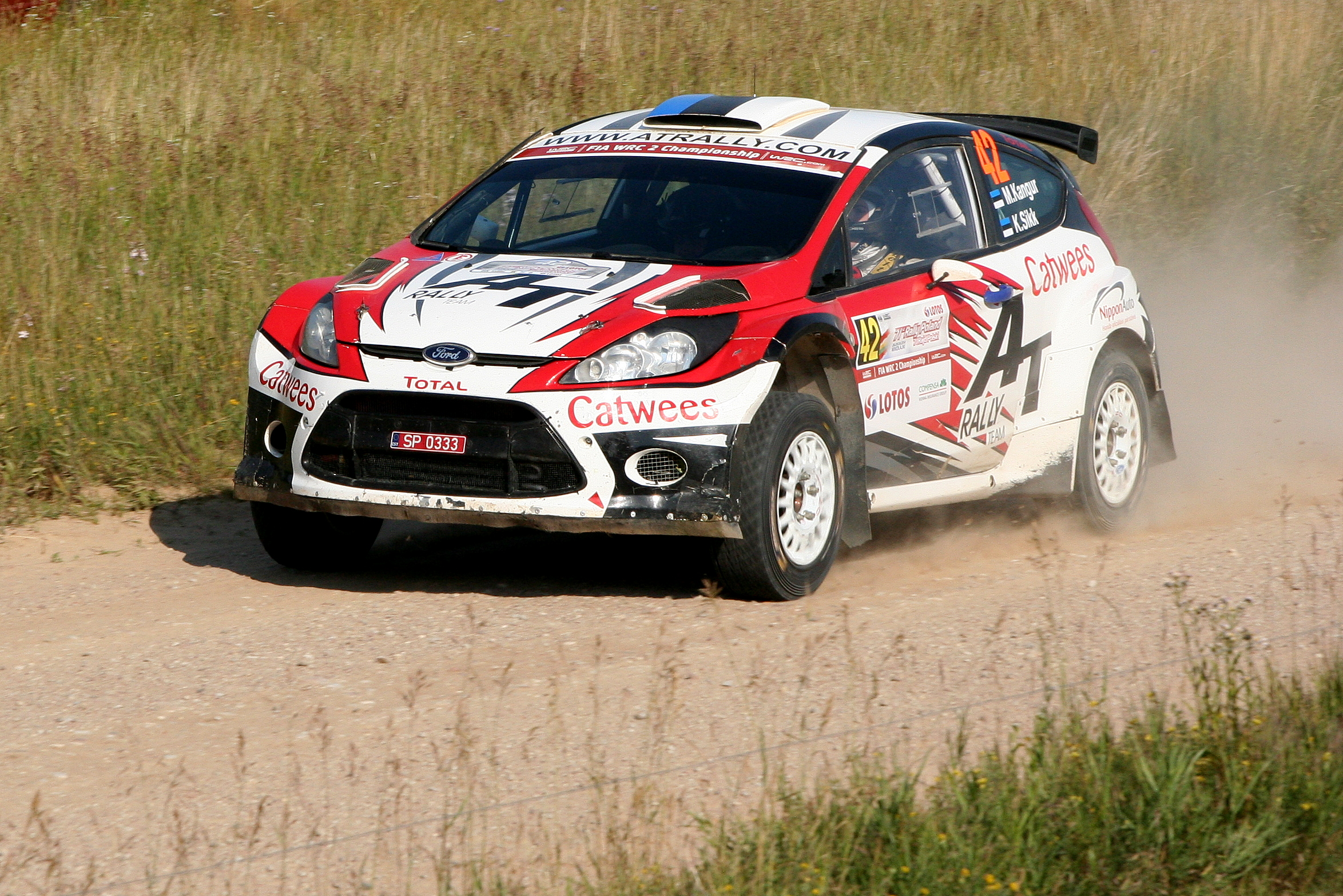
Ford Fiesta S2000

The following Rally2 or R5 cars are currently eligible for entry into WRC2:

- Lancia Ypsilon Rally2 HF Integrale
- Citroën C3 Rally2
- Ford Fiesta Rally2
- Hyundai i20 N Rally2
- Škoda Fabia Rally2 Evo
- Škoda Fabia RS Rally2
- Toyota GR Yaris Rally2
- Ford Fiesta R5
- Hyundai i20 R5
- Peugeot 208 T16 R5
- Škoda Fabia R5
- Volkswagen Polo GTI R5
- Proton Iriz R5

=== Historic eligibility ===
- Citroën DS3 R5

The following Super 2000 rally cars were eligible to compete in WRC2 up to the end of 2018:

- Fiat Grande Punto Abarth S2000
- Ford Fiesta S2000
- Peugeot 207 S2000
- Škoda Fabia S2000
- Toyota Auris S2000
- Volkswagen Polo S2000
- MG ZR S2000
- Opel Corsa S2000
- Proton Satria Neo S2000

The following RRC (Regional Race Car) were eligible to compete in WRC2 up to the end of 2018:

- Citroën DS3 RRC
- Ford Fiesta RRC
- Mini John Cooper Works S2000

The following cars were eligible to compete under the R4 or N4 rules up to the end of 2018:

- Mitsubishi Lancer Evolution IX
- Mitsubishi Lancer Evolution X
- Subaru Impreza STi

== Champions ==
=== Drivers' Championships ===
==== WRC2 ====
Year	Champion	Car	2nd place	Car	3rd place	Car
2026	(Estonia) Robert Virves	Škoda Fabia RS Rally2	(Finland) Roope Korhonen	Toyota GR Yaris Rally2	(France) Yohan Rossel	Lancia Ypsilon Rally2 HF Integrale
2025	(Sweden) Oliver Solberg	Toyota GR Yaris Rally2	(France) Yohan Rossel	Citroën C3 Rally2	(Bulgaria) Nikolay Gryazin	Škoda Fabia RS Rally2
2024	(Finland) Sami Pajari	Toyota GR Yaris Rally2	(Sweden) Oliver Solberg	Škoda Fabia RS Rally2	(Bulgaria) Nikolay Gryazin	Citroën C3 Rally2
2023	(Norway) Andreas Mikkelsen	Škoda Fabia RS Rally2	(United Kingdom) Gus Greensmith	Škoda Fabia RS Rally2	(France) Yohan Rossel	Citroën C3 Rally2
2022	(Finland) Emil Lindholm	Škoda Fabia Rally2 evo	(Norway) Andreas Mikkelsen	Škoda Fabia Rally2 evo	(Poland) Kajetan Kajetanowicz	Škoda Fabia Rally2 evo
2021	(Norway) Andreas Mikkelsen	Škoda Fabia Rally2 evo	(Norway) Mads Østberg	Citroën C3 Rally2	(Finland) Jari Huttunen	Hyundai i20 R5; Hyundai i20 N Rally2; Ford Fiesta Rally2
2020	(Norway) Mads Østberg	Citroën C3 R5	(Sweden) Pontus Tidemand	Škoda Fabia R5 evo	(France) Adrien Fourmaux	Ford Fiesta R5 Mk. II
2019	(France) Pierre-Louis Loubet	Škoda Fabia R5; Škoda Fabia R5 evo	(Poland) Kajetan Kajetanowicz	Volkswagen Polo GTI R5; Škoda Fabia R5	(Mexico) Benito Guerra Jr.	Škoda Fabia R5; Škoda Fabia R5 evo
2018	(Czech Republic) Jan Kopecký	Škoda Fabia R5	(Sweden) Pontus Tidemand	Škoda Fabia R5	(Finland) Kalle Rovanperä	Škoda Fabia R5
2017	(Sweden) Pontus Tidemand	Škoda Fabia R5	(France) Eric Camilli	Ford Fiesta R5	(Finland) Teemu Suninen	Ford Fiesta R5
2016	(Finland) Esapekka Lappi	Škoda Fabia R5	(United Kingdom) Elfyn Evans	Ford Fiesta R5	(Finland) Teemu Suninen	Škoda Fabia R5
2015	(Qatar) Nasser Al-Attiyah	Ford Fiesta RRC; Škoda Fabia R5	(Ukraine) Yuriy Protasov	Ford Fiesta RRC	(Finland) Esapekka Lappi	Škoda Fabia R5
2014	(Qatar) Nasser Al-Attiyah	Ford Fiesta RRC	(Finland) Jari Ketomaa	Ford Fiesta R5	(Italy) Lorenzo Bertelli	Ford Fiesta R5; Ford Fiesta RRC
2013	(Poland) Robert Kubica	Citroën DS3 RRC	(Qatar) Abdulaziz Al-Kuwari	Ford Fiesta RRC	(Ukraine) Yuriy Protasov	Subaru Impreza STi R4; Ford Fiesta RRC; Ford Fiesta R5

==== WRC 2 Pro ====
Year	Champion	Car	2nd place	Car	3rd place	Car
2019	(Finland) Kalle Rovanperä	Škoda Fabia R5; Škoda Fabia R5 evo	(Norway) Mads Østberg	Citroën C3 R5	(United Kingdom) Gus Greensmith	Ford Fiesta R5; Ford Fiesta R5 Mk. II

==== WRC2 Junior & Challenger ====
Year	Champion	Car	2nd place	Car	3rd place	Car
2026	(Estonia) Robert Virves	Škoda Fabia RS Rally2	TBD	TBD	TBD	TBD
2025	(Bulgaria) Nikolay Gryazin	Škoda Fabia RS Rally2	(Finland) Roope Korhonen	Toyota GR Yaris Rally2	(Estonia) Robert Virves	Škoda Fabia RS Rally2
2024	(Finland) Sami Pajari	Toyota GR Yaris Rally2	(Bulgaria) Nikolay Gryazin	Citroën C3 Rally2	(Poland) Kajetan Kajetanowicz	Škoda Fabia RS Rally2
2023	(Poland) Kajetan Kajetanowicz	Škoda Fabia Rally2 evo Škoda Fabia RS Rally2	Nikolay Gryazin	Škoda Fabia RS Rally2	(Finland) Sami Pajari	Škoda Fabia RS Rally2
2022	(Finland) Emil Lindholm	Škoda Fabia R5 evo	Nikolay Gryazin	Škoda Fabia R5 evo	(United Kingdom) Christopher Ingram	Škoda Fabia R5 evo

=== Statistics ===
==== By driver's country ====
Rank	Nation	Gold	Silver	Bronze	Total
1	Finland	4	2	5	11
2	Norway	3	3	0	6
3	Sweden	2	3	0	5
4	Qatar	2	1	0	3
5	France	1	2	3	6
6	Poland	1	1	1	3
7	Czech Republic	1	0	0	1
7	Estonia	1	0	0	1
9	Great Britain	0	2	1	3
10	Ukraine	0	1	1	2
11	Bulgaria	0	0	2	2
12	Italy	0	0	1	1
12	Mexico	0	0	1	1
Totals (13 entries)		15	15	15	45

==== By manufacturer ====
Rank	Manufacturer	Gold	Silver	Bronze	Total
1	Škoda	8	5	5	18
2	Ford	2	5	5	12
3	Citroën	2	3	2	7
4	Toyota	2	0	0	2
5	Volkswagen	0	1	0	1
6	Hyundai	0	0	1	1
6	Subaru	0	0	1	1
Totals (7 entries)		14	14	14	42

== See also ==
- WRC3
- Junior WRC
- Production World Rally Championship
- FIA 2-Litre World Rally Cup
