= Gray Leadbetter =

American professional racecar driver

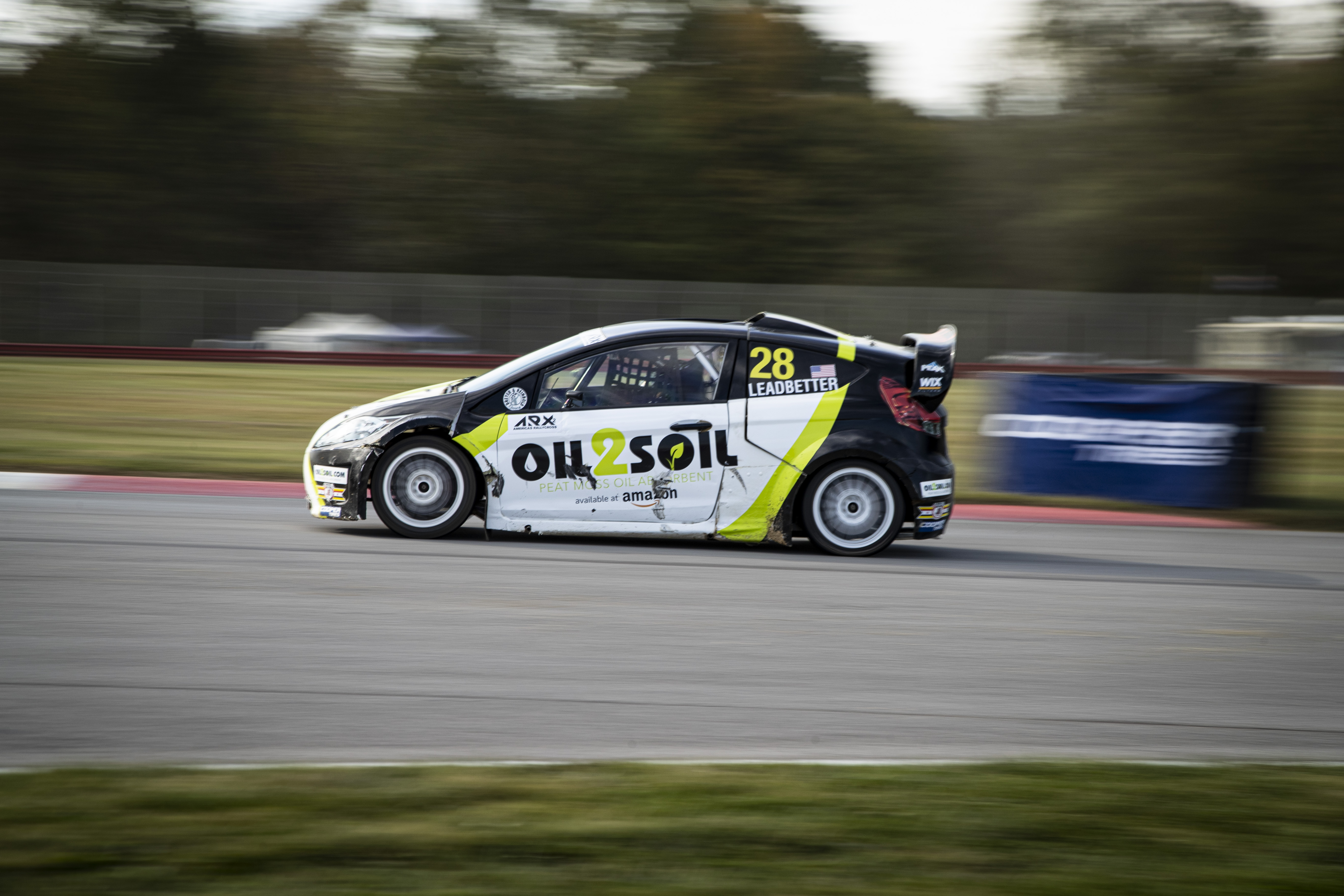
- Leadbetter driving in ARX2 in 2019
- Born: 9 December 2004 (age 21) Morganton, North Carolina, U.S.
- Relatives: Steve Leadbetter (father); Polly Leadbetter (mother)
- Current team: Gray Leadbetter Racing
- Car number: 28
- Former teams: Ryan Beat Motorsports; Dreyer & Reinbold Racing

Championship titles
- 2022: Championship Off-Road Pro Spec Champion

Awards
- 2018: Pippa Mann Scholarship recipient 2018

Gray Leadbetter (born 9 December 2004) is a professional American race car driver from Morganton, North Carolina. Leadbetter has competed in a broad range of motorsports including Motocross, Karting, legends, Rallycross, Championship Off-Road short course, midgets, micro 600s, and sprint cars. She is the first in her family to drive a race car.

== Early life and education ==
Leadbetter started playing around with motorized vehicles, first a little quad and then a PW50, at only four years old. Her family was not then knowledgeable about racing but she was able to gain support from neighbors, and she started racing in some FMF Arenacross in North Carolina.

In 2010, Leadbetter was the champion in the 4–6-year-old 50cc class at Daniels Ridge MX, Taylorsville, NC. She finished ninth in the KTM Jr SX Challenge at the Georgia Dome in Atlanta, GA in February 2013. After breaking her shoulder at the age of 7 in a motocross spill, Leadbetter made the move into karts because it was considered safer than motocross.

At the age of 12, Leadbetter received personal training from Swedish rally champion Patrik Sandell at the DirtFish Rally School in Washington state and on a frozen lake in Sweden. At the age of 14, she was training with 2004 Indy 500 Champion Buddy Rice on road courses and in rallycross.

Leadbetter attended On Track School, an online program for young athletes, and received her high school diploma in June 2022.

== Career ==
=== Karting (2015–2019) ===
Leadbetter started racing karts in 2015 at the GoPro Motorplex in Mooresville, NC. In July 2016, she took her first national podium with a second-place finish in the United States Pro Kart Series (USPKS) IAME Cadet Class. She moved up to the IAME Junior Class in December 2016 and finished second in her first race. Leadbetter's first national win came in September 2017 at the Chicagoland Super Grand Prix in the IAME Junior Division. She was the first female driver to win in the category and finished fourth place in the class championship the same year.

In October 2017, Leadbetter posted her first World Karting Association victory at the GoPro Motorplex, her home track in Mooresville, NC. She took second place the following day. Leadbetter has competed in USPKS, Super Karts USA (SKUSA), and World Karting Association.

=== Rallycross (2019-present) ===
Leadbetter's first drive in a professional series came at the age of 14, when she signed with Dreyer & Reinbold Racing of IndyCar fame to run the 2019 Americas Rallycross Championship. Driving in the ARX2 class, which included drivers with IndyCar experience, Leadbetter competed in all nine events and finished fifth overall in the championship. Her best finish was fourth place, which she achieved twice. The series folded after the 2019 season.

Leadbetter contested the 2023–24 Nitrocross Championship in the SxS category; she would place third in the championship standings with four podium finishes. She would return to the category for the 2024-25 championship, reaching sixth in the standings with a season high of third place at Utah Motorsports Campus before the season was halted and the remaining events were cancelled.

In 2026, Leadbetter returned to rallycross, joining the inaugural RallyX Americas championship in the Supercar category for First Corner FC2 cars, driving the No. 28 MoTEC car at Crandon and Eldora. She would finish the season fifth in the standings, contesting three of four rounds.

=== Championship Off-Road (2019–2022) ===
In 2022, Leadbetter was the first woman to win a Pro Class Championship in the Championship Off-Road closed-course series that runs in the upper Midwest. Driving the Pro Spec Class Ryan Beat Motorsports No. 28 Bilstein Chevrolet Colorado, she won the season opener and three more races to take the crown. Ledbetter started driving in the Championship Off-Road series in 2019 with the Greaves Motorsports team. In December 2020, she was the first woman and youngest competitor to win a Sportsman SXS race.

=== Sprint car (2021–present) ===
Leadbetter moved into sprint cars in 2021 driving for Marc Dailey Racing. She started in the 450 hp 305 sprint car, but by the end of the year, she had moved up into the 900 hp 410 winged sprint car. She finished fifth in her first 410 race at Cherokee Speedway in S.C. Leadbetter qualified to compete in the World of Outlaws Finals in Charlotte, N.C. in both 2021 and 2022. In 2023, Leadbetter drove a 410 sprint car with Marc Dailey Racing in the All Star Circuit of Champions.

=== Extreme E (2024) ===
In February 2024, Legacy Motor Club joined electric off-road racing series Extreme E for the 2024 season with Jimmie Johnson as the lead driver. Leadbetter partnered with Travis Pastrana for the first two rounds of the season with Pastrana substituting Johnson, who was tied up with 2024 Daytona 500 during the weekend. The team finished in sixth in Rounds 1 and 2 at the Desert X-Prix while scoring its first Super Sector in Round 2. Extreme E male championship reserve driver Patrick O'Donovan was announced as Leadbetter's partner for Rounds 3 and 4. On September 6, a week before the scheduled Island X-Prix, Extreme E announced that the rounds in Sardinia and Phoenix were cancelled.

== Ambassadorship ==
=== National Pediatric Cancer Foundation (2022–present) ===
In January 2022, Leadbetter became an ambassador for the National Pediatric Cancer Foundation. In addition to promoting the NPCF through her racing and public appearances at NPCF events, Leadbetter has committed to donating 10% of her sponsorship dollars to the group. The NPCF is a nonprofit organization dedicated to funding and developing novel research and clinical trials to find less toxic, more effective treatments for childhood cancer.

== Racing record ==
=== Complete Extreme E results ===
(key)

Year	Team	Car	1	2	3	4	5	6	7	8	9	10	Pos.	Points
2024	Legacy Motor Club	Spark ODYSSEY 21	DES; 1; 6	DES; 2; 6	HYD; 1; 5	HYD; 2; 6	ISL1; 1 C	ISL1; 2 C	ISL2; 1 C	ISL2; 2 C	VAL; 1 C	VAL; 2 C	6th ^{†}	37 ^{†}

^{†} Season abandoned.
