= 2024 Extreme E Championship =

Electric car racing season

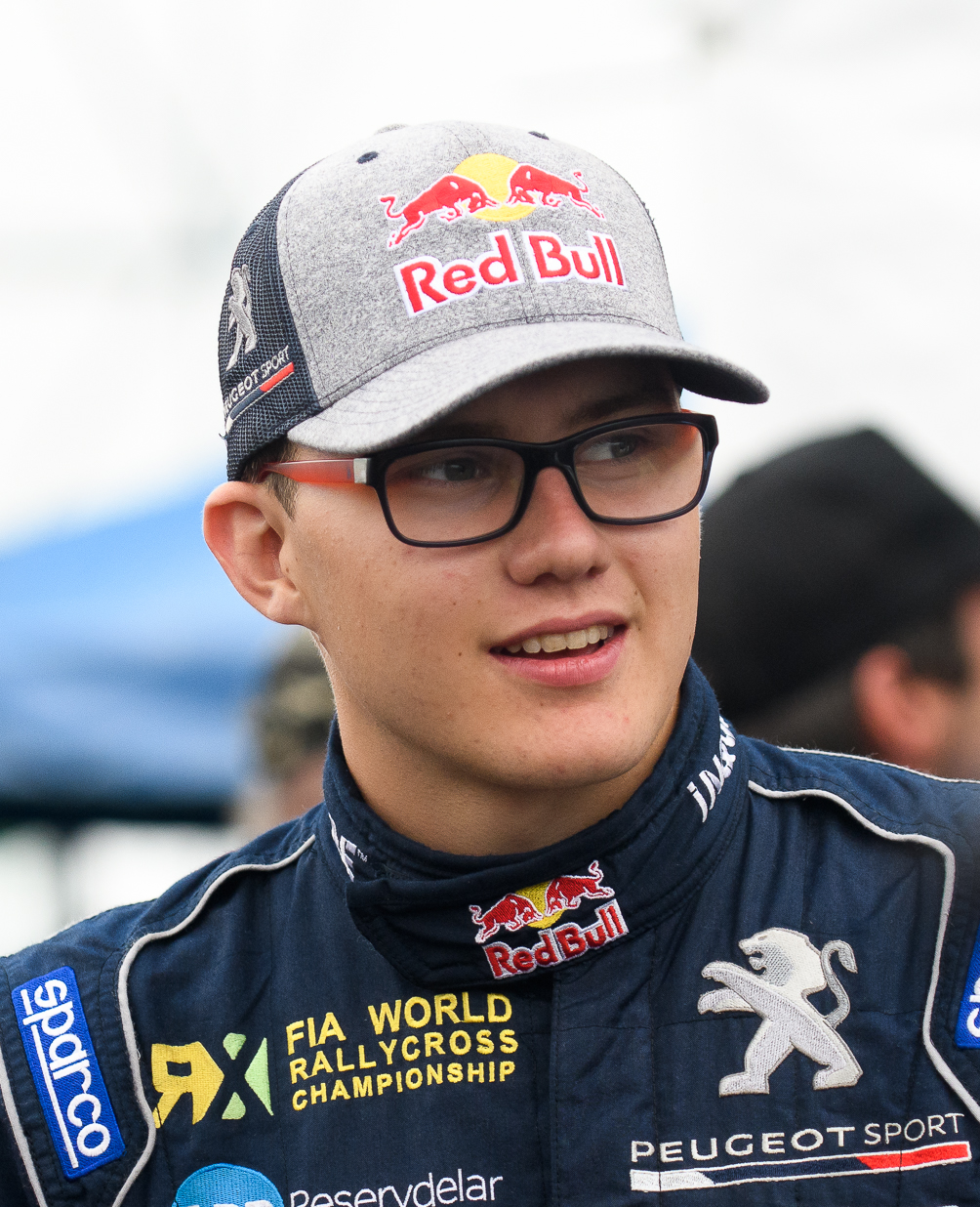
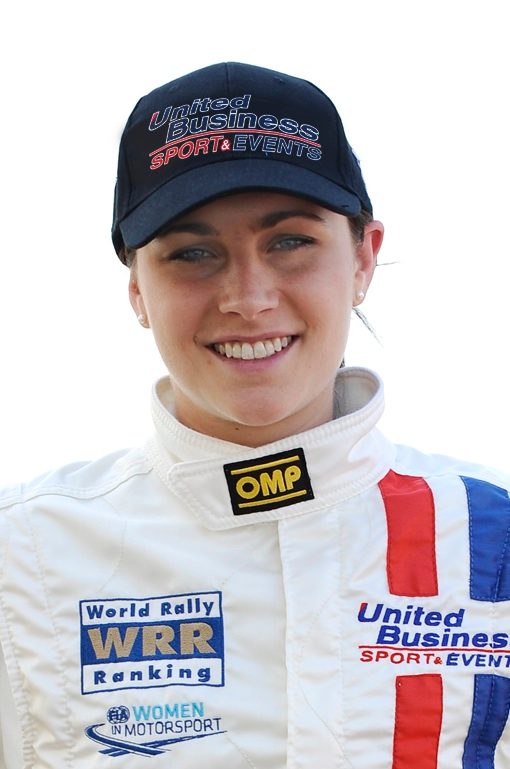
Kevin Hansen (left) and Molly Taylor (right) were the championship leaders for Veloce Racing.

The 2024 Extreme E Championship was the fourth season of the Extreme E electric off-road racing series. Originally planned as the final season before the transition to hydrogen fuel cell cars for 2025, it was abandoned after only 4 of 10 races.

== Calendar ==
On 21 December 2023, the provisional 2024 season calendar was announced. Saudi Arabia and Sardinia returned from the previous year, the latter as a double-header, with a first trip to the United States replacing Chile as the season finale in America. There was a five-month gap between the season opener in Saudi Arabia and rounds three and four, to take place at an undisclosed location in Europe, later confirmed to be Scotland.

On 6 September 2024, a week before the scheduled Island X-Prix, Extreme E announced the cancellation of the remaining rounds in Sardinia and Phoenix, with Alejandro Agag said to be "reviewing alternative solutions" to complete the season.

Round	Event	Location	Dates
1	Desert X-Prix	Jeddah, Saudi Arabia	17 February 2024
2	Desert X-Prix	Jeddah, Saudi Arabia	18 February 2024
3	Hydro X-Prix	(United Kingdom) Dumfries and Galloway, Scotland	13 July 2024
4	Hydro X-Prix	(United Kingdom) Dumfries and Galloway, Scotland	14 July 2024

The following events were cancelled:

Event	Location	Dates
Island X-Prix I	Sardinia, Italy	14 September 2024
Island X-Prix I	Sardinia, Italy	15 September 2024
Island X-Prix II	Sardinia, Italy	21 September 2024
Island X-Prix II	Sardinia, Italy	22 September 2024
Valley X-Prix	Phoenix, United States	23 November 2024
Valley X-Prix	Phoenix, United States	24 November 2024

=== Race format ===
Minor format tweaks were made to accommodate the reduced number of cars. Each qualifying heat will now consist of four cars, with 10, 8, 6 and 4 intermediate points being handed out. Combined qualifying results at the end of both segments will now see the top four cars qualify for the grand final instead of the top five. Accordingly, the bottom four qualifiers will slot in the "redemption race" to decide positions fifth to eighth. One change was made to the points system, as the winner of the redemption race will now score 12 points, as many as the fourth-placed car in the grand final.

== Teams and drivers ==
The impending switch to hydrogen saw the grid shrink from ten to eight cars for 2024. Abt Cupra, Chip Ganassi Racing and Lewis Hamilton's X44 team all left the series, as did Carl Cox Motorsport, who outlined intentions to return for Extreme H in 2025. There were two new entrants: Jimmie Johnson-led NASCAR team Legacy Motor Club and Swiss-owned outfit SUN Minimeal, run by former Carl Cox driver Timo Scheider. All teams used one of the identical Odyssey 21 electric SUVs manufactured by Spark Racing Technology and consisted of a male and a female driver, who shared a car and had equal driving duties.

Team	No.	Drivers	Rounds
(United Kingdom) E.ON Veloce Racing (United Kingdom) E.ON Next Veloce Racing (Note: E.ON Veloce Racing rebranded as E.ON Next Veloce Racing ahead of round 3.)	5	(Sweden) Kevin Hansen	All
(United Kingdom) E.ON Veloce Racing (United Kingdom) E.ON Next Veloce Racing	5	(Australia) Molly Taylor	All
(Germany) Rosberg X Racing	6	(Sweden) Johan Kristoffersson	All
(Germany) Rosberg X Racing	6	(Sweden) Mikaela Åhlin-Kottulinsky	All
(Germany) SUN Minimeal Team	8	(Sweden) Klara Andersson	All
(Germany) SUN Minimeal Team	8	(Germany) Timo Scheider	All
(United Kingdom) JBXE	22	(Norway) Andreas Bakkerud	All
(United Kingdom) JBXE	22	(Saudi Arabia) Dania Akeel	1–2
(United Kingdom) JBXE	22	(United States) Amanda Sorensen	3–4
(United States) Andretti Altawkilat Extreme E	27	(United Kingdom) Catie Munnings	All
(United States) Andretti Altawkilat Extreme E	27	(Sweden) Timmy Hansen	All
(Spain) Acciona | Sainz XE Team	55	(Spain) Laia Sanz	All
(Spain) Acciona | Sainz XE Team	55	(Jamaica) Fraser McConnell	All
(United Kingdom) Neom McLaren Extreme E Team	58	(Spain) Cristina Gutiérrez	All
(United Kingdom) Neom McLaren Extreme E Team	58	(Sweden) Mattias Ekström	All
(United States) Legacy Motor Club	84	(United States) Gray Leadbetter	All
(United States) Legacy Motor Club	84	(United States) Travis Pastrana	1–2
(United States) Legacy Motor Club	84	(United Kingdom) Patrick O'Donovan	3–4

- Before the season was abandoned, Jimmie Johnson was scheduled to race for his Legacy Motor Club team at the final six rounds.

Championship reserve drivers
Drivers	Rounds
(Spain) Christine GZ	1–2
(Italy) Tamara Molinaro	3–4
(United Kingdom) Patrick O'Donovan	1–2
(Finland) Tommi Hallman	3–4

== Results and standings ==
=== X-Prix ===
Round	Event	Qualifying 1		Qualifying 2		Qualifying Overall	Redemption Race	Super Sector (Note: Commercially known as the "Continental Traction Challenge".)	Grand Final
Round	Event	Heat 1	Heat 2	Heat 1	Heat 2	Qualifying Overall	Redemption Race	Super Sector	Grand Final
1	(Saudi Arabia) Desert X-Prix	(United Kingdom) Veloce	(Germany) RXR	(Spain) Acciona | Sainz	(Germany) RXR	(Germany) RXR	(United States) Andretti	(United Kingdom) Veloce	(Germany) RXR
2	(Saudi Arabia) Desert X-Prix	(Germany) RXR	(Spain) Acciona | Sainz	(United States) Andretti	(Germany) RXR	(Germany) RXR	(United Kingdom) McLaren	(United States) Legacy M.C.	(Spain) Acciona | Sainz
3	(United Kingdom) Hydro X-Prix	(United Kingdom) Veloce	(United States) Andretti	(United Kingdom) Veloce	(Germany) RXR	(United Kingdom) Veloce	(United States) Legacy M.C.	(United Kingdom) Veloce	(United Kingdom) Veloce
4	(United Kingdom) Hydro X-Prix	(United Kingdom) JBXE	(Germany) RXR	(Spain) Acciona | Sainz	(United States) Legacy M.C.	(Spain) Acciona | Sainz	(United Kingdom) McLaren	(Spain) Acciona | Sainz	(United Kingdom) Veloce
—	(Italy) Island X-Prix I	Cancelled							
—	(Italy) Island X-Prix I	Cancelled							
—	(Italy) Island X-Prix II	Cancelled							
—	(Italy) Island X-Prix II	Cancelled							
—	(United States) Valley X-Prix	Cancelled							
—	(United States) Valley X-Prix	Cancelled							

Scoring system

Points are awarded to the top eight finishers. An additional 2 points are given to the fastest team in the Super Sector over the whole weekend. The winning team and drivers in each qualifying heat also get 1 extra point.

Position	1st	2nd	3rd	4th	5th	6th	7th	8th	QH	SS
Points	25	18	15	12		8	6	4	1	2 (Note: Only for the teams' championship.)

Only the best four X-Prix results count towards the drivers' championship.

=== Drivers' Championship standings ===
Pos.	Driver	DES (Saudi Arabia)		HYD (United Kingdom)		Points
1	(Sweden) Kevin Hansen (Australia) Molly Taylor	3^{H}	3	1^{HH}	1	83
2	(Jamaica) Fraser McConnell (Spain) Laia Sanz	4^{H}	1^{H}	2	2^{H}	76
3	(Sweden) Johan Kristoffersson (Sweden) Mikaela Åhlin-Kottulinsky	1^{HH}	4^{HH}	4^{H}	4^{H}	67
4	(United Kingdom) Catie Munnings (Sweden) Timmy Hansen	5	2^{H}	3^{H}	3	62
5	(Spain) Cristina Gutiérrez (Sweden) Mattias Ekström	2	5	8	5	46
6	(United States) Gray Leadbetter	6	6	5	6^{H}	37
7	(Sweden) Klara Andersson (Germany) Timo Scheider	8	7	6	7	24
8	(United Kingdom) Patrick O'Donovan			5	6^{H}	21
9	(Norway) Andreas Bakkerud	7	8	7	8^{H}	21
10	(United States) Travis Pastrana	6	6			16
11	(United States) Amanda Sorensen			7	8^{H}	11
12	(Saudi Arabia) Dania Akeel	7	8			10
Pos.	Driver	DES (Saudi Arabia)		HYD (United Kingdom)		Points

Key
Colour	Result
Gold	Winner
Silver	2nd place
Bronze	3rd place
Green	Other points position
Black	Disqualified (DSQ)
White	Did not start (DNS)
White	Withdrew (WD)
White	Race cancelled (C)

H – Qualifying heat winner
* – Fastest in Super Sector

=== Teams' Championship standings ===
Pos.	Team	DES (Saudi Arabia)		HYD (United Kingdom)		Points
1	(United Kingdom) E.ON Veloce Racing (United Kingdom) E.ON Next Veloce Racing	3^{H}*	3	1^{HH}*	1	87
2	(Spain) Acciona | Sainz XE Team	4^{H}	1^{H}	2	2^{H}*	78
3	(Germany) Rosberg X Racing	1^{HH}	4^{HH}	4^{H}	4^{H}	67
4	(United States) Andretti Altawkilat Extreme E	5	2^{H}	3^{H}	3	62
5	(United Kingdom) Neom McLaren Extreme E Team	2	5	8	5	46
6	(United States) Legacy Motor Club	6	6*	5	6^{H}	39
7	(Germany) SUN Minimeal Team	8	7	6	7	24
8	(United Kingdom) JBXE	7	8	7	8^{H}	21
Pos.	Team	DES (Saudi Arabia)		HYD (United Kingdom)		Points
