= EWRC-results.com =

Czech online database website

eWRC-results.com
- Website type: Online database
- Available in: 12 languages
- List of languages Czech, Dutch, Estonian, English, French, German, Italian, Japanese, Polish, Portuguese, Russian, Spanish
- Founded: 2006; 20 years ago
- Founder: Tomáš Wanka
- Employees: 40
- Website: ewrc-results.com
- Current status: Online

eWRC-results.com is a Czech online database website founded in 2006. The website features data and statistics in the motorsport of rallying that ranges from World Rally Championship to national rally events dating back to 1911.

== History ==
In early 2022, the website was once forced to shut down due to financial issues. The website has since relaunched.

== Partnership ==
On 18 May 2022, DirtFish announced a partnership with the website, which would ensure greater visibility and usability in terms of rallying result. Former Hyundai Motorsport team principal Andrea Adamo oversaw the deal.
