= DirtFish =

Rally driving school and media company

- Type: Private
- Industry: Sports
- Founded: 2009; 17 years ago
- Founder: Steve Rimmer
- Headquarters: Snoqualmie, Washington, U.S.
- Area served: Motorsport and automotive
- Brands: eWRC-results.com
- Website: dirtfish.com

DirtFish is an American rally driver training school and media company based in Snoqualmie, Washington. Its media arm is notable for reporting on rallying championships around the world, including the World Rally Championship, European Rally Championship and American Rally Association. The school also houses the car collection of its owner and founder, Steve Rimmer.

== Rally school ==
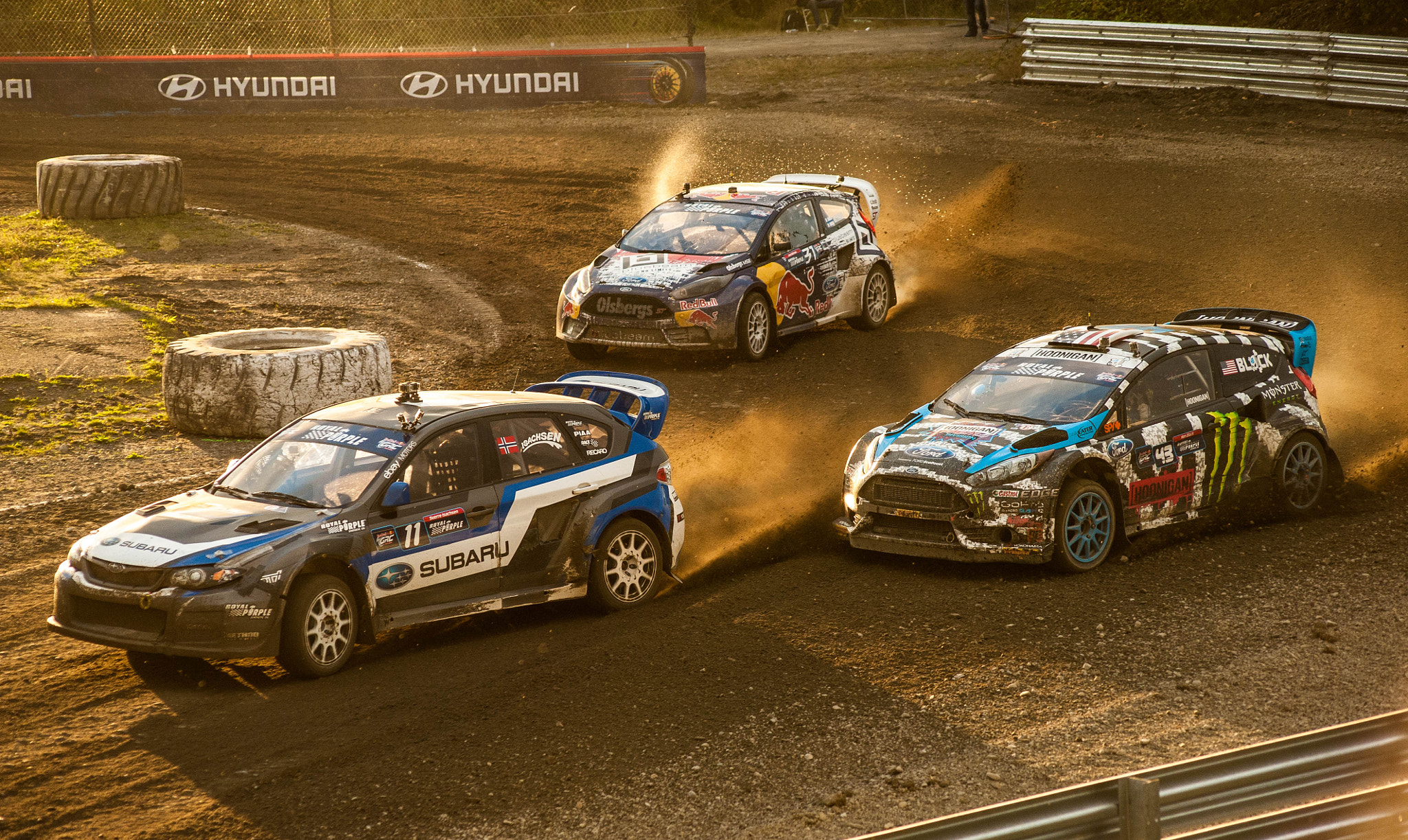
Global Rallycross event at the Dirtfish rally school

The school was established in 2009 in Washington state, USA in the disused grounds of a former lumber mill. Learners use Subaru BRZ and Impreza WRX STI cars on 27 miles of asphalt, gravel and mud surface roads. The site also has a conference centre for corporate hire named after world rally champion, Colin McRae.

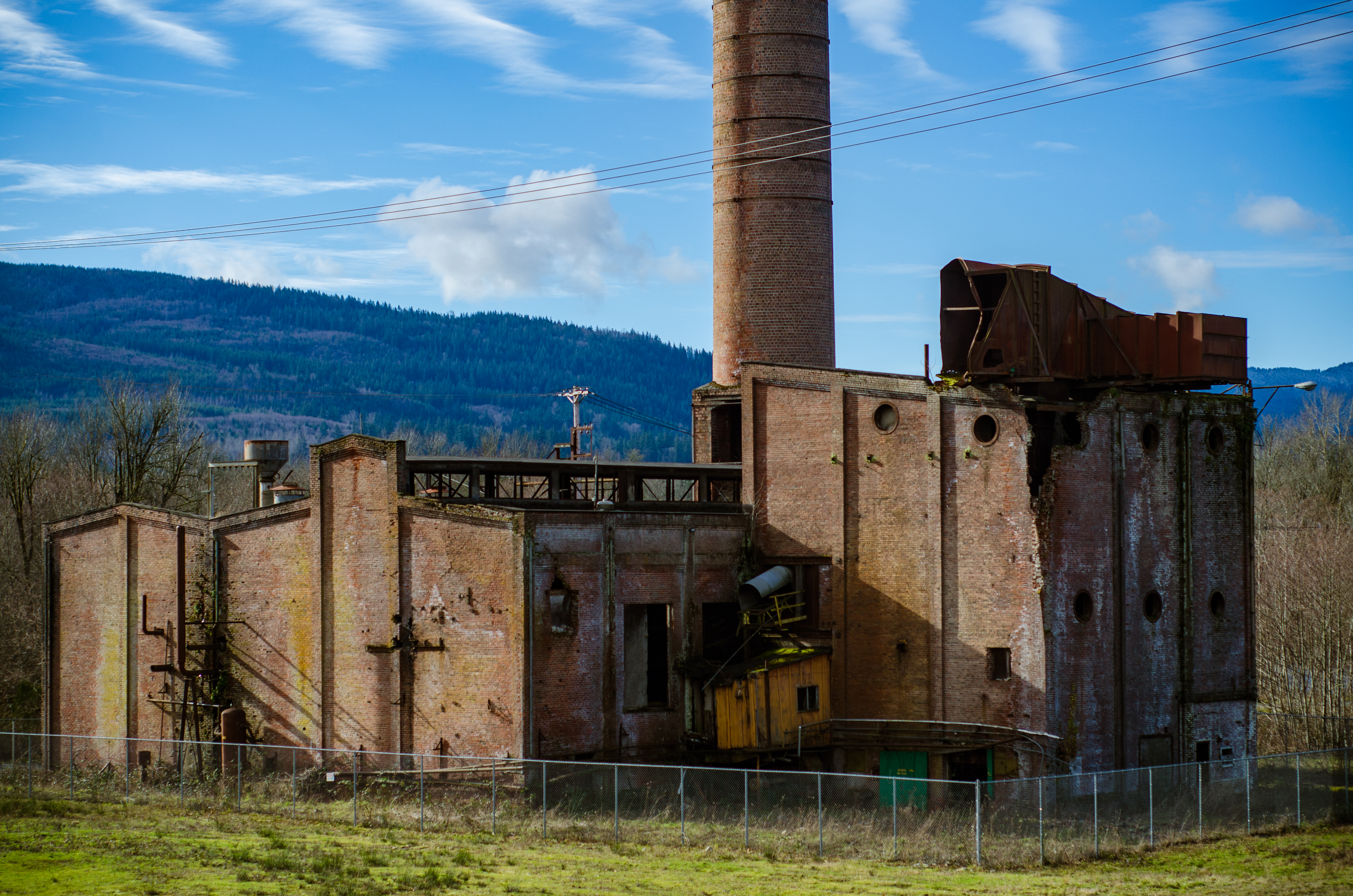
The abandoned Weyerhaeuser lumber mill at the DirtFish complex

The site has also had a connection with Travis Pastrana, and held rounds of the Global Rallycross series as well as American format RallyCross events. It has also featured in media such as films, television and video games, with commercials being filmed for T-Mobile at the rally school, while the site also featured as the police station in the Twin Peaks TV series and film which continues to attract fans of the show. The training school is also featured as a drivable level in the Colin McRae Rally and Dirt and Project Cars 2 franchises of video game driving simulators.

== Dirtfish media ==
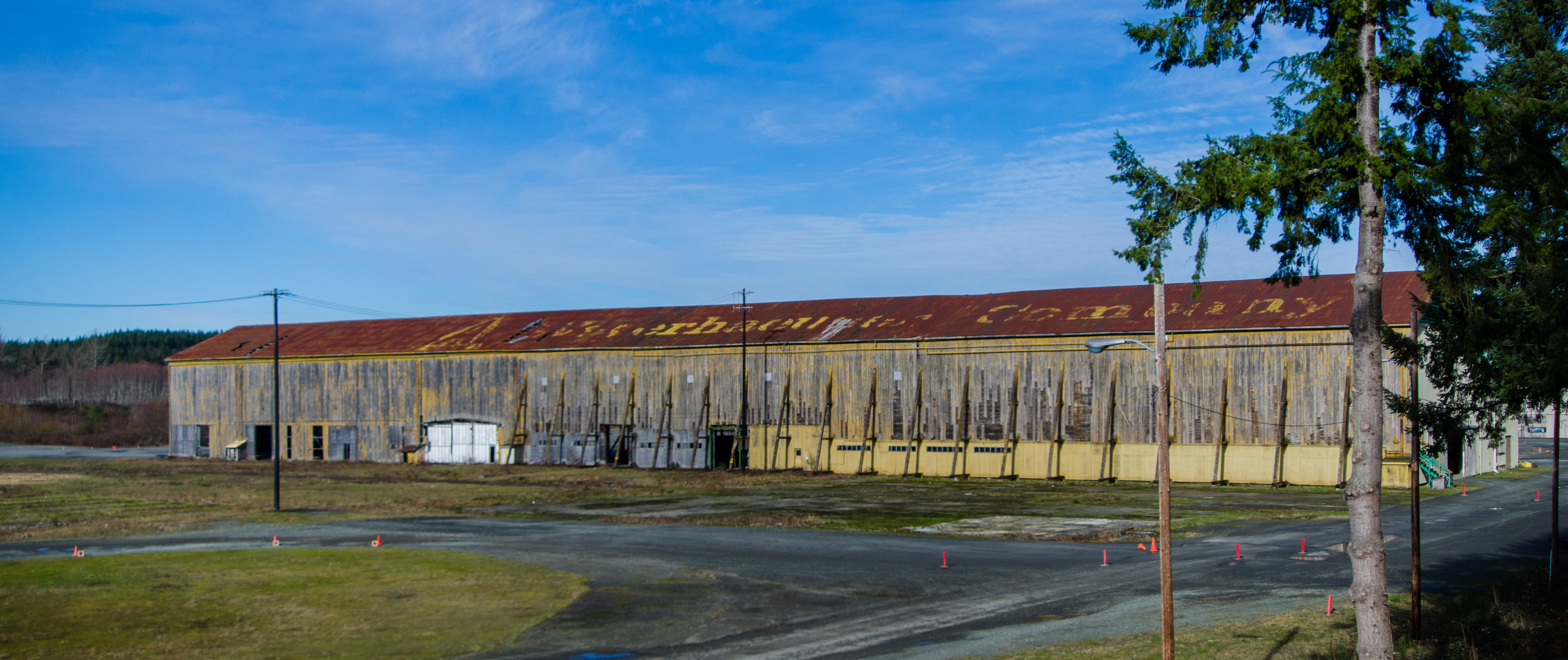
Cones marking out a road course at the DirtFish Rally School

DirtFish expanded operations into media ahead of the 2020 World Rally Championship season. Colin Clark, who had been a reporter for World Rally Radio and WRC All Live, joined the digital only venture for its launch, and the company announced a sponsorship deal with reigning 2019 WRC champion, Ott Tänak. David Evans, formerly rallying editor of Autosport and Motorsport News, joined the company within a few weeks.

In February 2022, the online rally results service ewrc-results.com became unavailable to access, citing financial circumstances hindering the website's viability. In a deal brokered by former Hyundai Team Principal, Andrea Adamo, DirtFish became a sponsor of EWRC which enabled the site to remain operational.

In 2024, the company acquired the rights to the media archive of Barry Hinchliffe Productions (BHP), covering international rallying events from the 1970s and 1980s. British TV presenter Steve Rider, who was both involved in the productions and the seller of the archive, made the public announcement in a video for Dirtfish media.

Alongside text news and feature articles on the company's website, the media output also includes a podcast called SPIN, The Rally Pod, featuring Clark, Evans and former Toyota Team Principal George Donaldson. The same personnel also live stream and report direct from WRC events.

== Women in motorsport ==
A Women in Motorsport summit was held at the Dirtfish complex for the first time in 2022 to coincide with International Women's Day and has been held annually since. In 2025, the summit moved to a larger venue in Tacoma to accommodate 350 on-site guests whilst live-streaming the event online to 400,000 viewers. Speakers have included Michèle Mouton, Pernilla Solberg, Emma Gilmour, Claire Williams and Becs Williams, with the Fédération Internationale de l'Automobile noting the significance of the event and regularly sending officials.

In 2025, a Dirtfish Women in Motorsport Driver Program was launched with two drivers receiving support in their motorsport activities: Michele Abbate, a circuit racer in the Americas, and Aoife Raftery, a rally driver competing in the European Rally Championship.

== Car collection ==
The owner of Dirtfish, Steve Rimmer, owns a large quantity of sports, classic and rally cars; some of which are based at the Dirtfish school with others being based in the United Kingdom. These include Group B WRC competition cars such as Lancia 037, Audi Quattro and Peugeot 205 GTI T16 and a rare Citroen BX 4TC. The collection has been on display at the LeMay Car Museum in Tacoma who called it 'the most iconic amazing collection of rally cars, maybe in the entire world'. The cars regularly make appearances in enthusiast media, and at events such as Goodwood Festival of Speed and Pebble Beach Concours.
