= Alfa Romeo Tonale =

Italian compact luxury crossover SUV

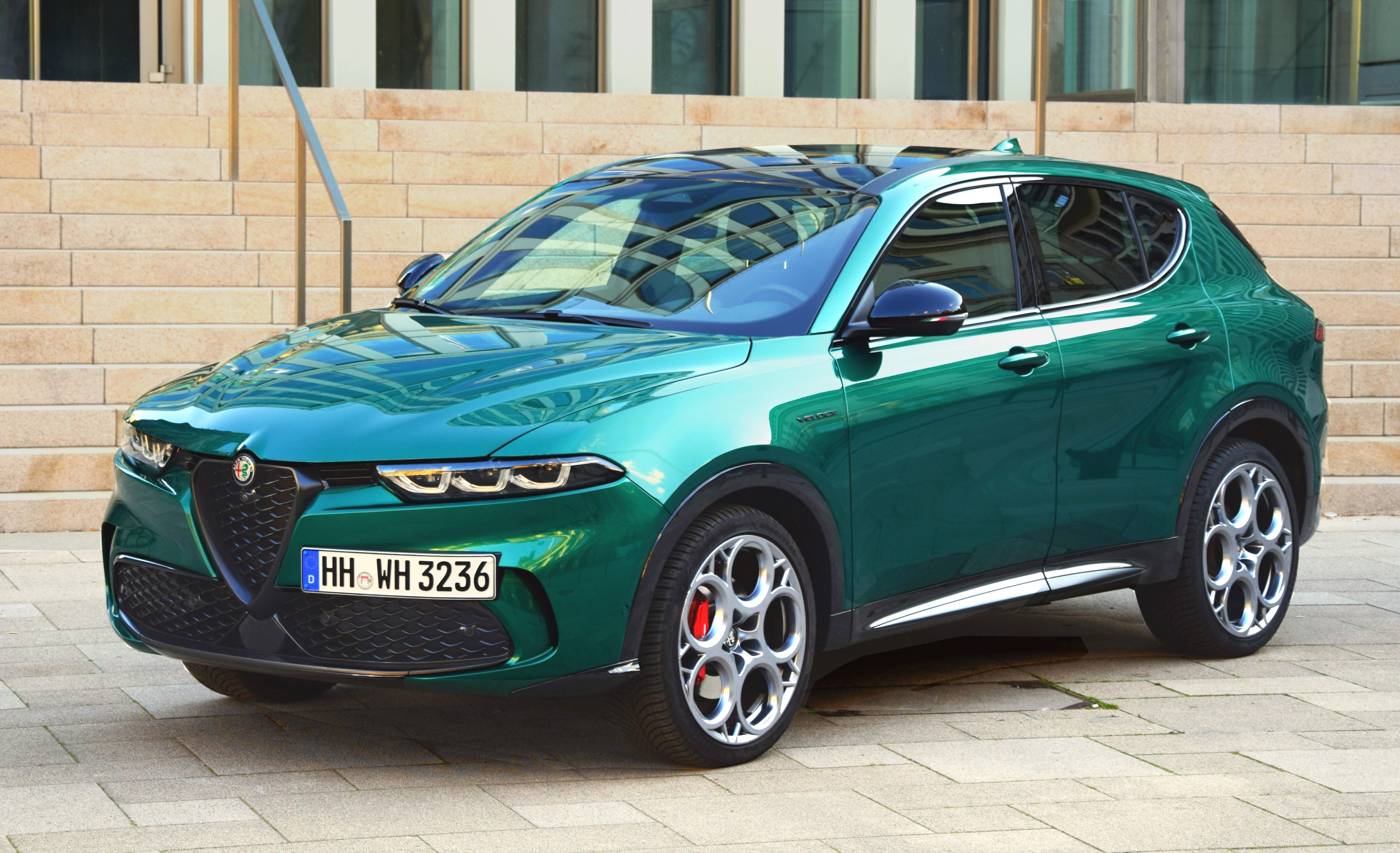

Overview
- Manufacturer: Alfa Romeo
- Model code: 965
- Also called: Dodge Hornet
- Production: 2022–present
- Model years: 2023–2026 (North America)
- Assembly: Italy: Pomigliano d'Arco (Stellantis Pomigliano Plant)
- Designer: Alexandros Liokis at Centro Stile Alfa Romeo under Alejandro Mesonero-Romanos

Body and chassis
- Class: Compact luxury crossover SUV (C)
- Body style: 5-door SUV
- Layout: Front-engine, front-wheel-drive or all-wheel-drive
- Platform: FCA Small Wide 4×4 LWB
- Related: Dodge Hornet

Powertrain
- Engine: Petrol: 2.0 L GME T4 turbo I4; Petrol/electric mild hybrid: 1.5 L GSE Firefly turbo I4; 1.5 L GSE Firefly VGT I4; Petrol plug-in hybrid: 1.3 L GSE turbo I4; Diesel: 1.6 L Multijet turbo I4
- Electric motor: 15 kW (20 hp; 20 PS) 48-volt P2 (MHEV); 45 kW (60 hp; 61 PS) FCA eMotor (4xe); 90 kW (121 hp; 122 PS) FCA eMotor (4xe)
- Power output: 95 kW (127 hp; 129 PS) (Hybrid); 117 kW (157 hp; 159 PS) (Hybrid VGT); 134 kW (180 hp; 182 PS) (engine); 212.5 kW (285 hp; 289 PS) (combined); 191 kW (256 hp; 260 PS) (2.0)
- Transmission: 6-speed FPT C635 dual-clutch automatic; 7-speed Alfa Romeo TCT dual-clutch automatic; 9-speed ZF 9HP automatic (2.0)
- Hybrid drivetrain: Mild hybrid; Plug-in hybrid
- Battery: 15.5 kWh lithium-ion (PHEV)

Dimensions
- Wheelbase: 2,637 mm (103.8 in)
- Length: 4,530 mm (178.3 in)
- Width: 1,840 mm (72.4 in)
- Height: 1,600 mm (63.0 in)
- Curb weight: 1,525–1,835 kg (3,362–4,045 lb)

The Alfa Romeo Tonale is a compact luxury crossover produced by the Italian company Alfa Romeo since February 2022. Being a five-seater compact luxury crossover SUV, it slots above the Alfa Romeo Junior and below the Alfa Romeo Stelvio in the marque's crossover SUV range. Known internally as the 965, the Tonale is the first hybrid-powered Alfa Romeo and became the first new model introduced by the brand in six years. It is named after the Tonale mountain pass in Northern Italy.

In August 2022, a rebadged and restyled version was unveiled as the Dodge Hornet, exclusive to the North American market as the smallest, entry-level SUV offering from Dodge. The Hornet was sold alongside the Tonale in the region with different specs and lower pricing.

== Overview ==
The production Tonale had originally been scheduled for release in 2021, but was delayed until 2022 due to the global semiconductor shortage and Alfa Romeo management demanding better range and performance from its drivetrain. It was developed during the ownership of Fiat Chrysler Automobiles and underpinned by a heavily modified version of the SCCS crossover platform shared with the Jeep Compass. It is also the first Alfa Romeo to be equipped with an optional plug-in hybrid system, which uses a 15.5 kWh (56 MJ) lithium-ion battery to achieve 30 miles (48 km) of all-electric range. The Tonale marks the brand's electrification effort, where Alfa Romeo will be the first brand among the 14 brands of Stellantis to go fully electric by 2027. The Tonale is marketed in the premium segment, and has been described variously as a "compact crossover", a "compact SUV", a "small SUV", and a "tall hatchback".

All models of the Tonale are equipped with a 12.3-inch (31 cm) digital infotainment cluster and a 10.25-inch (26.0 cm) infotainment screen, which will run on the Uconnect 5 software suite. In addition, the Tonale will come with an NFT that records and stores data of the car's life cycle. According to Alfa Romeo, the NFT will generate a certificate that Stellantis claims can help maintain the car's residual value. The Verge noted that Alfa Romeo had not provided much information about what blockchain technology they intended to use for this. Jalopnik felt that digitising a car's service history was a good idea, but that blockchain NFTs were a "bad" and "entirely unnecessary" way to achieve this.

According to Alfa Romeo, the Tonale was designed to offer more driving engagement than the class average by using a very quick steering rack (2.3 turns lock-to-lock). It also features torque vectoring by braking, frequency-selective dampers as standard, and adaptive items and four-piston brakes on the range-topping Veloce.

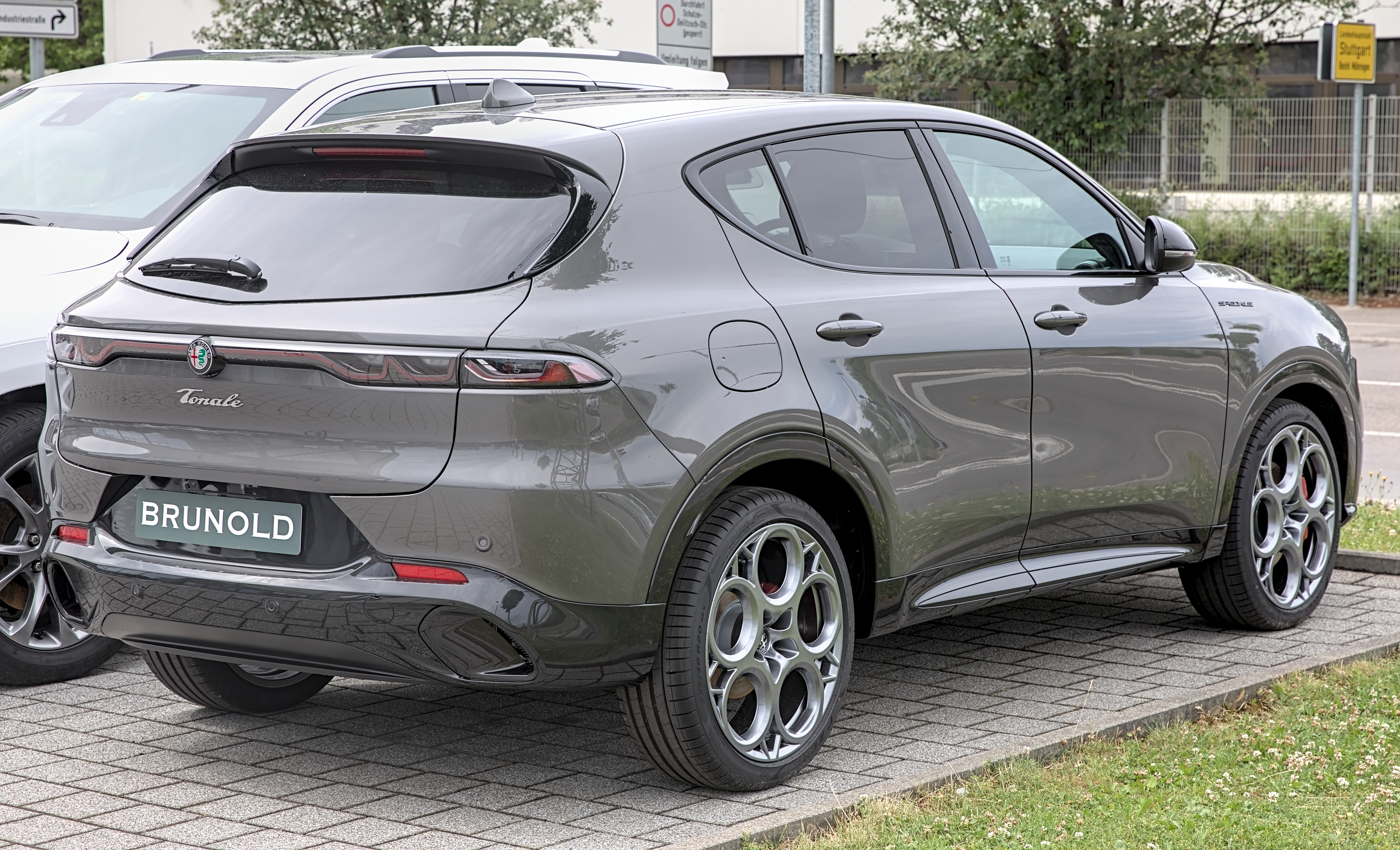
Rear view

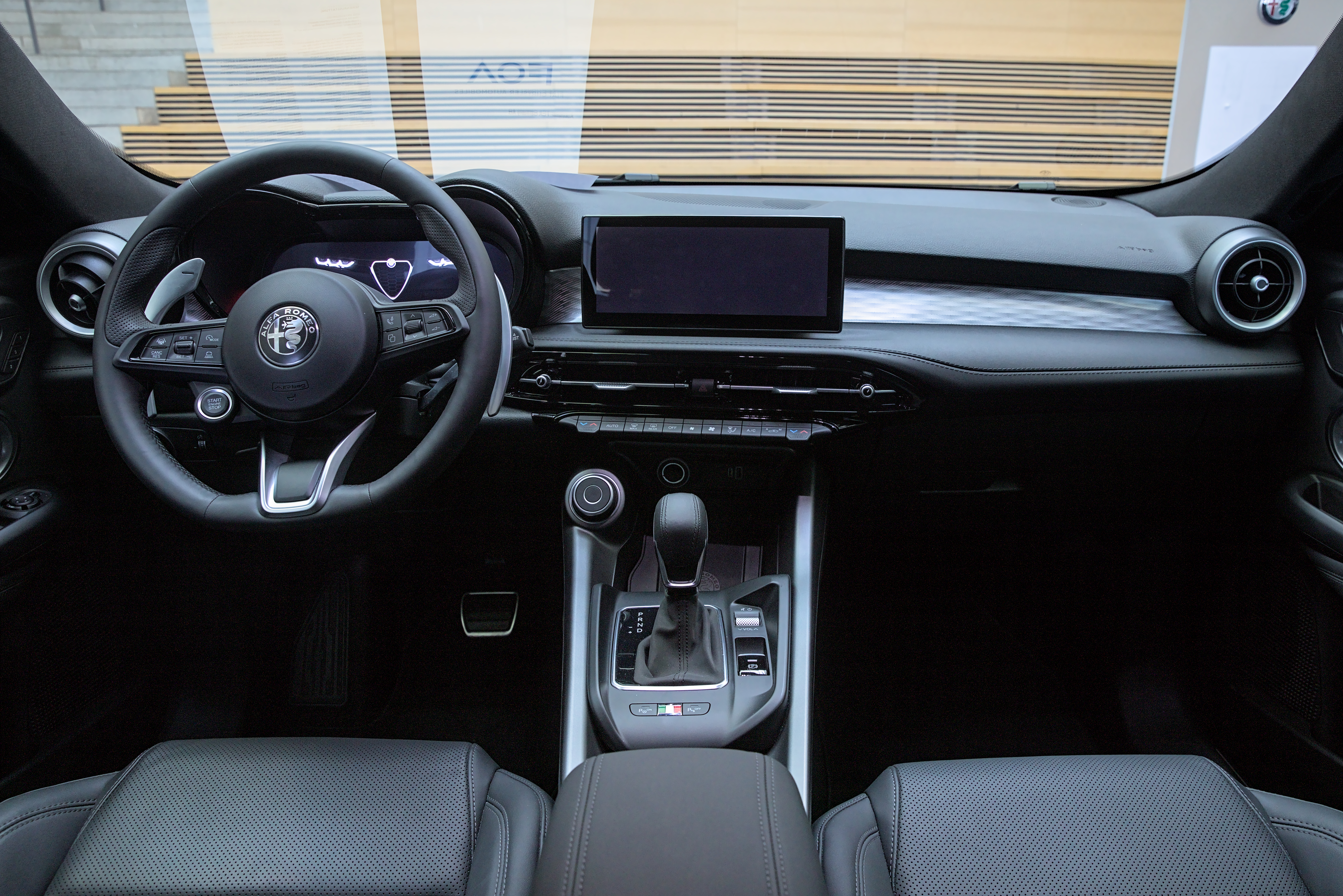
Interior

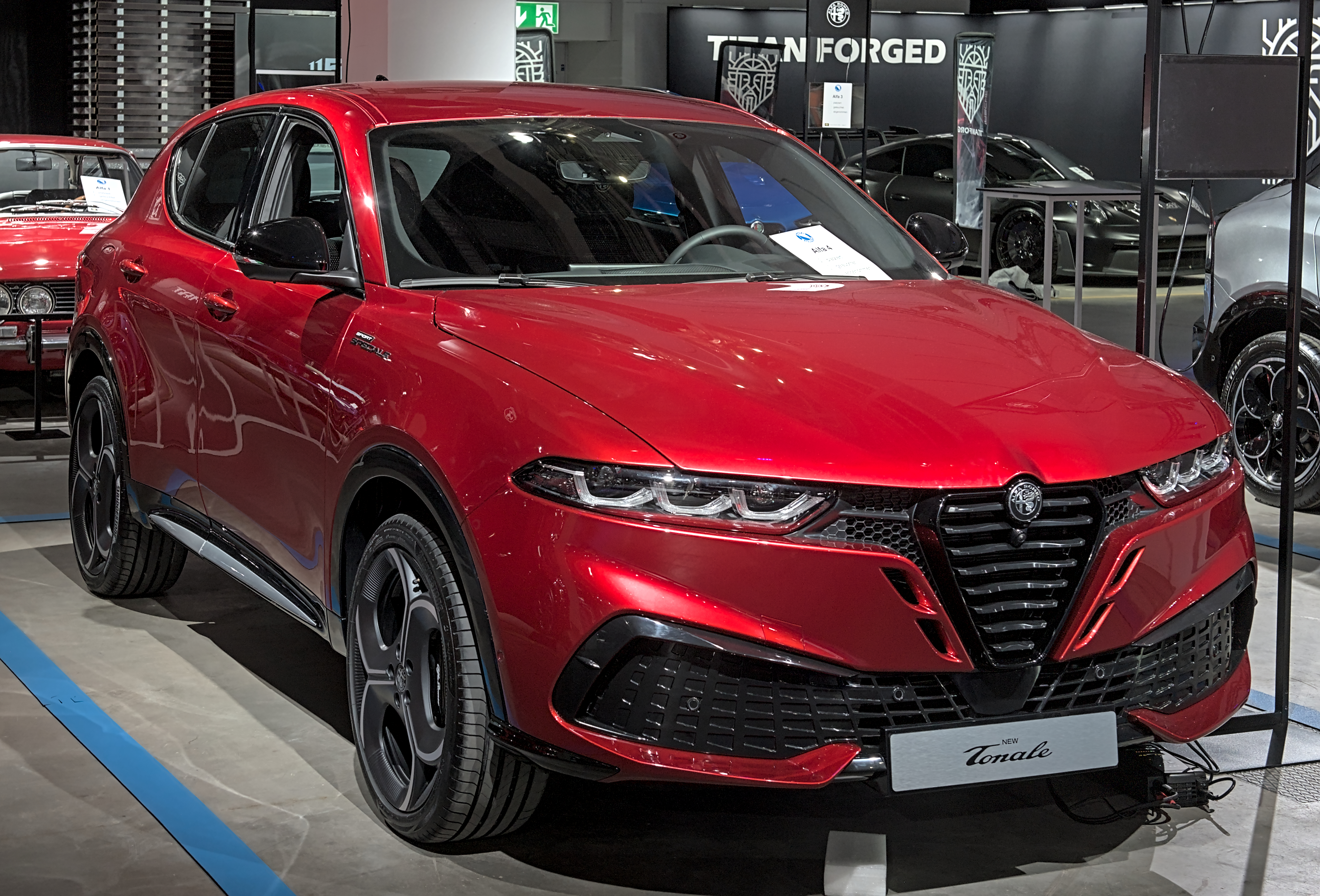
Facelift

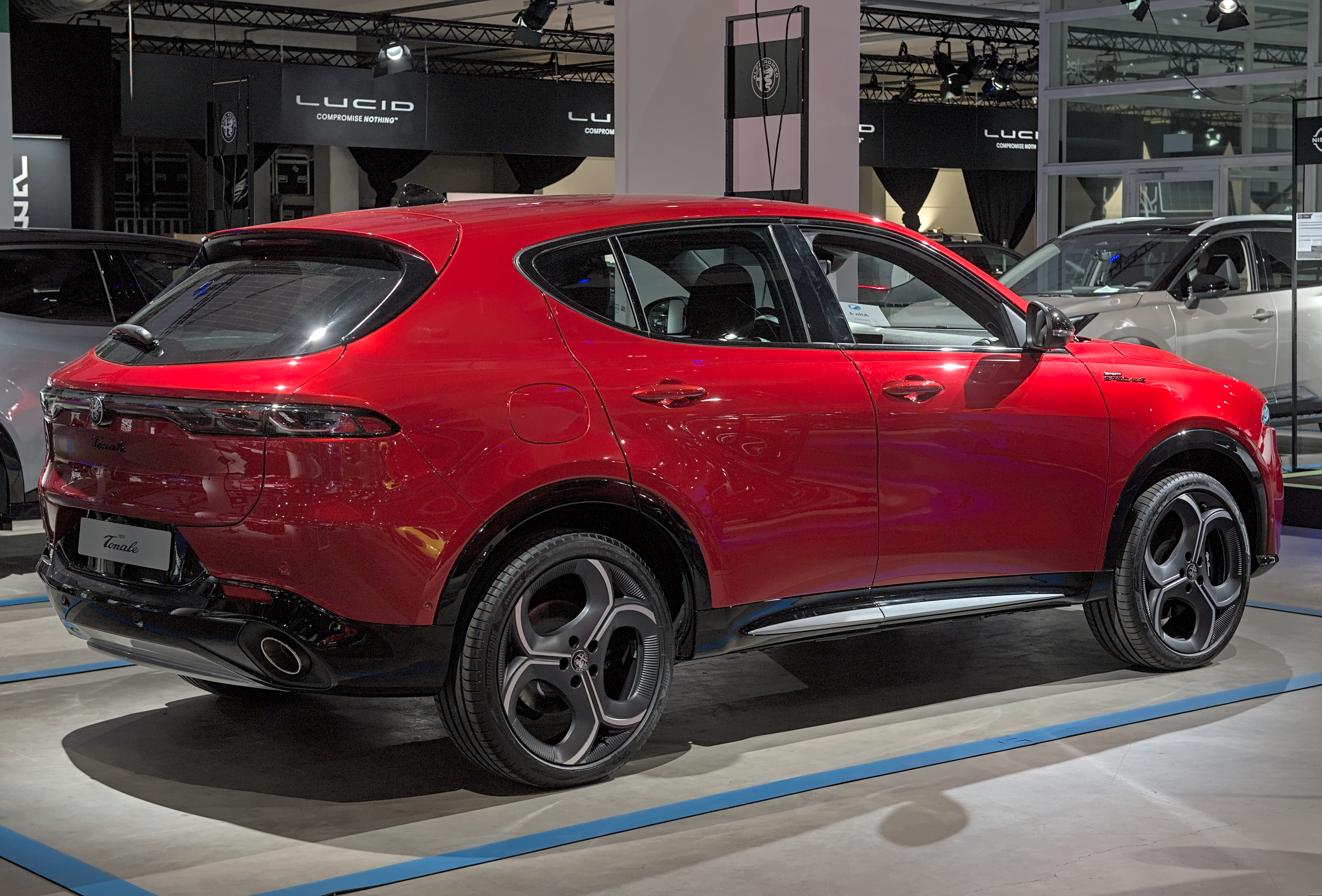
Rear view (Facelift)

== Powertrain ==
One of the powertrain options is a newly developed Alfa Romeo-exclusive 160 hp (162 PS; 119 kW) 1.5-litre petrol engine with a variable-geometry turbocharger (VGT) and 48 V hybrid system, paired with a 7-speed DCT dual-clutch transmission and a 48 V 15 kW (20 PS; 20 hp) and 55 N⋅m (5.61 kg⋅m; 40.6 lb⋅ft) P2 electric motor (135 N⋅m (13.8 kg⋅m; 99.6 lb⋅ft) with a 2.5:1 transmission ratio). It can propel the wheels even when the internal combustion engine is turned off. The hybrid Tonale is claimed to be capable of 0–100 km/h (0–62 mph) in 8.8 seconds and a maximum speed of over 209 km/h (130 mph). The engine comes with a compression ratio of 12.5:1, a new cylinder head with a compact combustion chamber, dual variable valve timing, and "high-tumble" intake ducts.

A 48 V lithium-ion battery with a 0.8 kWh capacity is used. The capacity is more than twice that of batteries commonly used on belt-driven starter-generator (BSG) hybrid systems, while providing an output of up to 22 kW (30 PS; 30 hp). The battery has a volume of about 11 litres and does not affect the size of the boot, as it is installed under the central tunnel between the front seats. The boot size is, however, smaller than the petrol only models with no space for a spare tire. The dual voltage system with a DC/DC converter from 48 to 12 volts manages the interface with the electrical architecture of the vehicle.

== Markets ==
=== Europe ===
The Tonale has Apple CarPlay, Android Auto, and Amazon Alexa integrated into its user interface, which also has a 10.25-inch (260 mm) touchscreen. Regular versions of the car have 18-inch (460 mm) wheels, whilst a special edition sold at launch had 20-inch (510 mm) wheels along with other cosmetic changes. The plug-in hybrid version has less boot space than the non-plug-in version.

=== North America ===
The Tonale for Canada was released for the 2023 model year, with the option of a 2.0 L petrol turbocharged engine or a 1.3 L petrol plug-in hybrid engine. In the U.S. market, initially only the 2.0 L was available. The Tonale was withdrawn from the North American market following the 2026 model year.

==== Dodge Hornet ====
The Hornet was released in August 2022 for the U.S. and Canada, and is Dodge's first compact SUV since the discontinuation of the Jeep Liberty-based Dodge Nitro in 2011. Compared to the North American Tonale, the Hornet received a restyled front end, headlights, and taillights.

The Hornet name was acquired by Chrysler Corporation following their acquisition of American Motors Corporation (AMC) in 1987. All Hornets feature a "Bee" emblem on the front fenders.

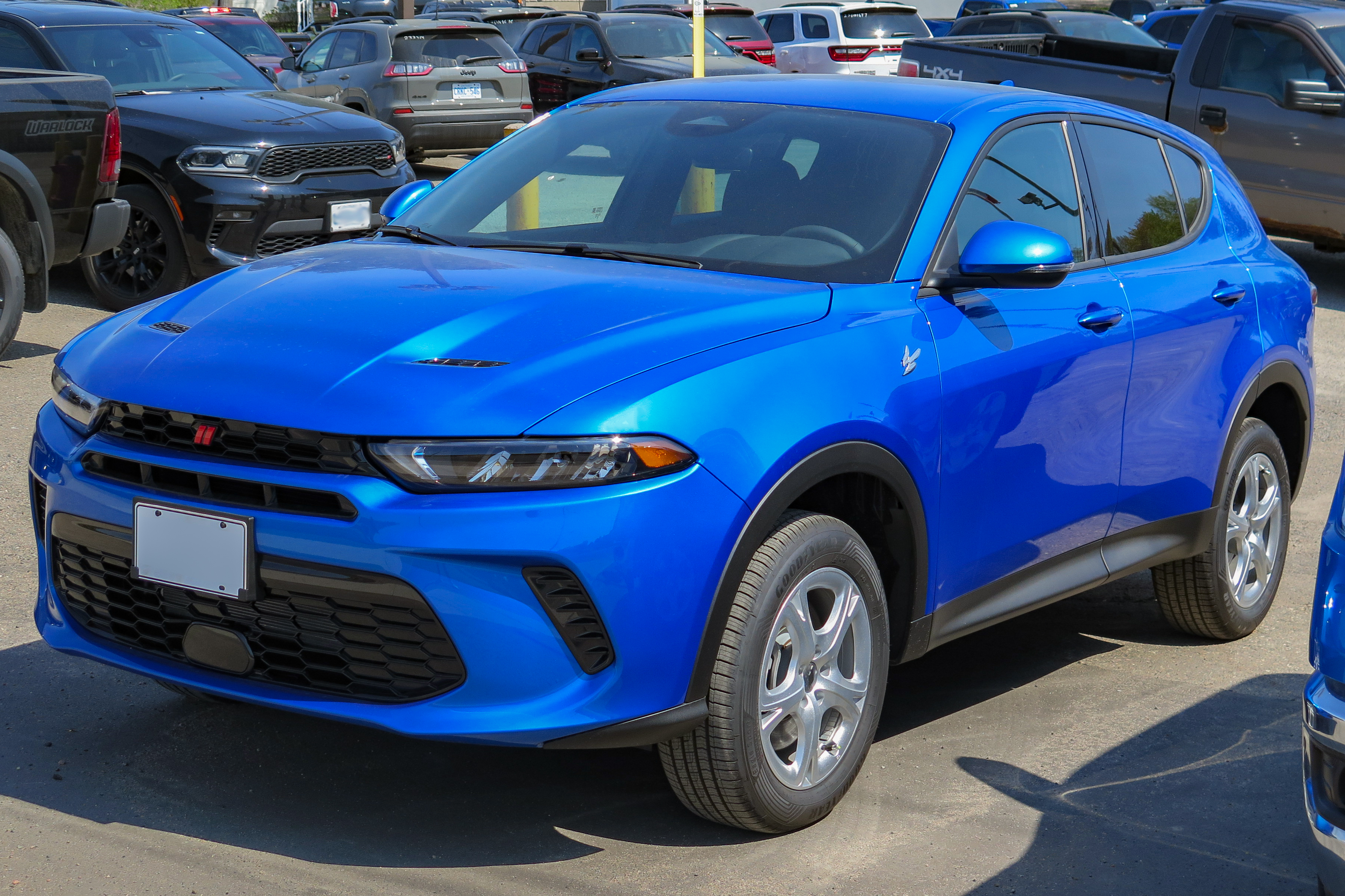
2023 Dodge Hornet GT, front view

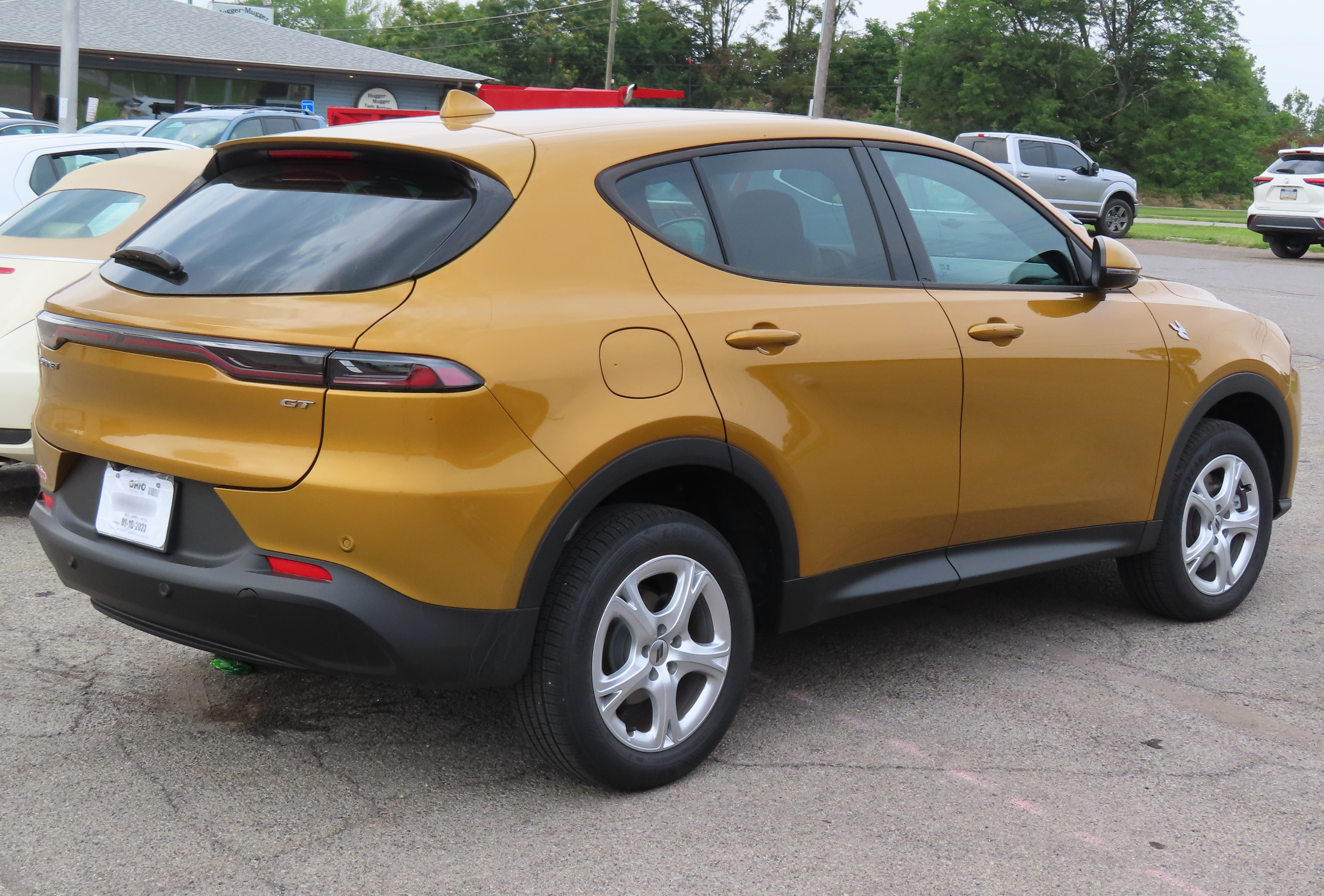
2023 Dodge Hornet GT, rear view

== Safety ==
ANCAP test results Alfa Romeo Tonale (2022, aligned with Euro NCAP)
Test	Points	%
Overall:	5 /5 stars	
Adult occupant:	32.15	84%
Child occupant:	42.88	87%
Pedestrian:	36.23	67%
Safety assist:	13.62	85%

Euro NCAP test results Alfa Romeo Tonale 1.5 GSE MHEV (LHD) (2022)
Test	Points	%
Overall:	5 /5 stars	
Adult occupant:	31.6	83%
Child occupant:	41.9	85%
Pedestrian:	36.2	67%
Safety assist:	13.6	85%

== Concepts ==
=== Tonale Concept ===
The Tonale Concept was unveiled in March 2019 at the Geneva Motor Show. It features a plug-in hybrid drivetrain from the Jeep Renegade, presumably with a front-mounted petrol engine and a rear-mounted electric motor. Different driving modes were featured: Dual Power mode for maximum performance, Natural mode for everyday use, and Advanced Efficiency for electric propulsion only. Additional touchscreen settings were claimed to further adjust throttle behaviour, braking response, and steering feel.

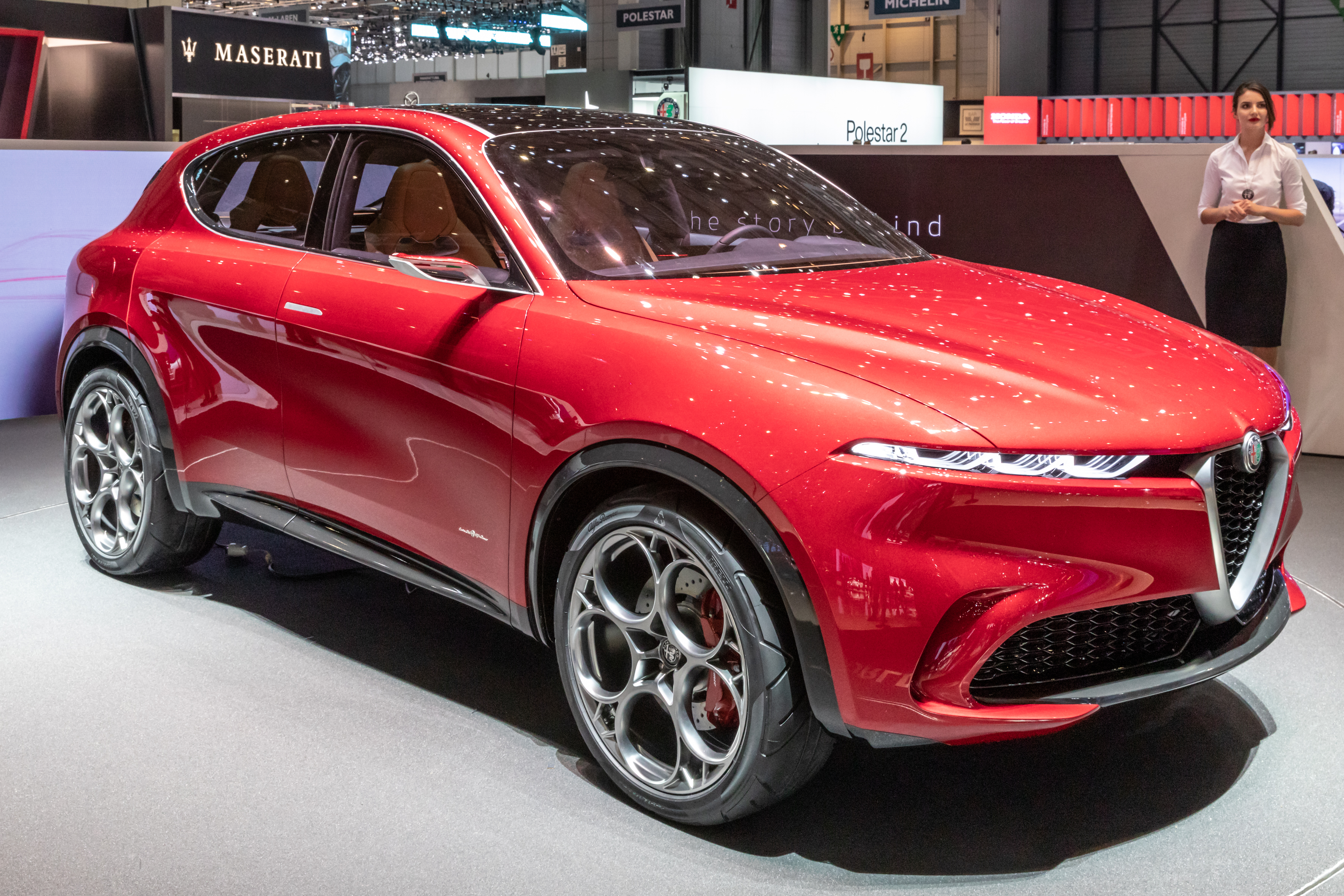
Front view

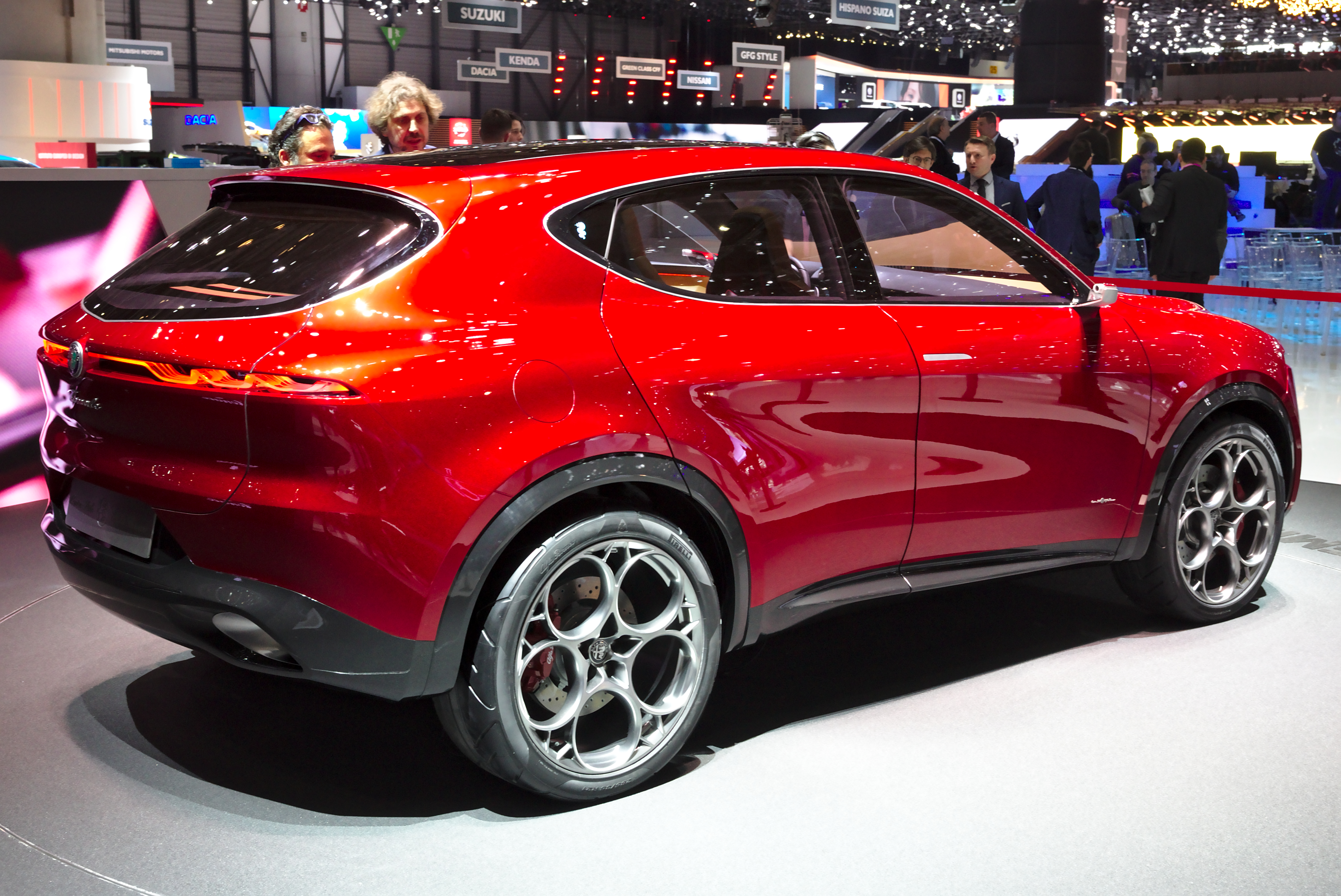
Rear view

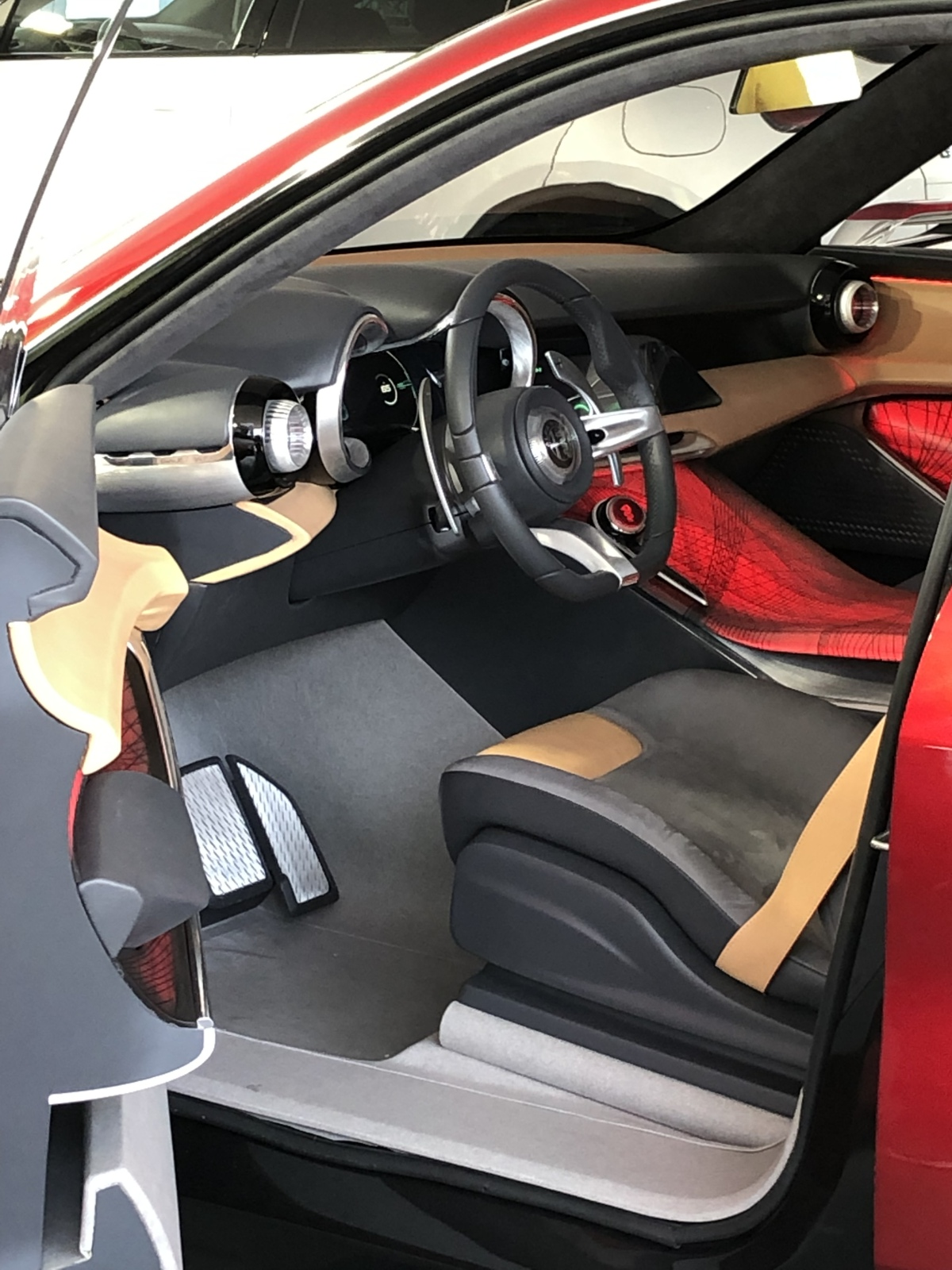
Interior
