= Dodge Hornet =

Compact crossover SUV

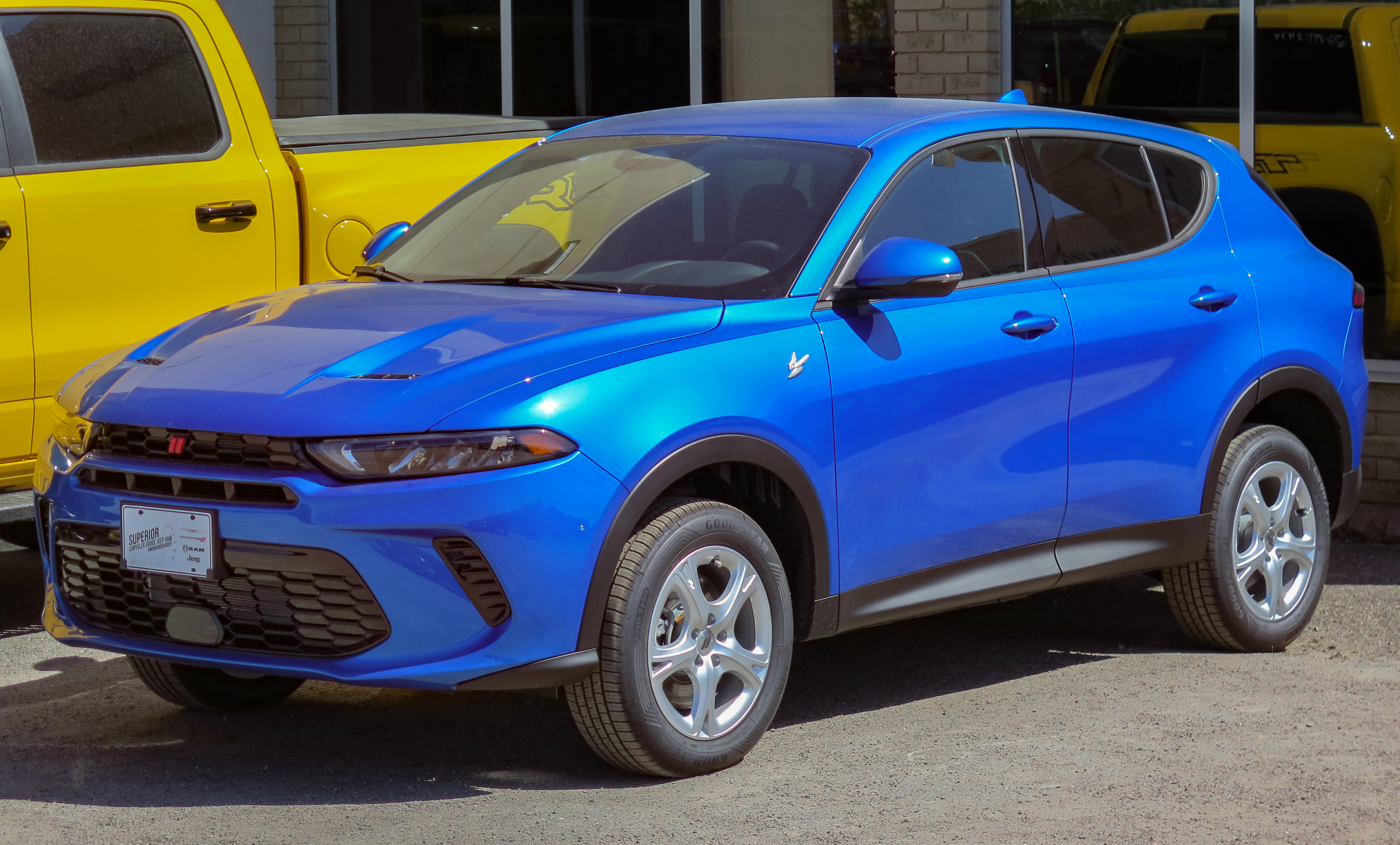
- 2023 Dodge Hornet GT

Overview
- Manufacturer: FCA Italy S.P.A. (Stellantis Europe)
- Also called: Alfa Romeo Tonale
- Production: August 2022 − January 2026
- Model years: 2023−2025
- Assembly: Italy: Pomigliano d'Arco (Alfa Romeo)
- Designer: Jeff Gale

Body and chassis
- Class: Compact crossover SUV (C)
- Body style: 5-door SUV
- Layout: Front-engine, four-wheel-drive layout
- Platform: FCA Small Wide 4×4 LWB
- Related: Alfa Romeo Tonale

Powertrain
- Engine: Petrol: 2.0 L Hurricane4 turbo I4 (GT); Petrol plug-in hybrid: 1.3 L turbo I4 (R/T)
- Electric motor: Dual electric motors
- Transmission: 9-speed automatic (GT); 6-speed automatic (RT)
- Hybrid drivetrain: Plug-in hybrid
- Battery: 15.5 kWh lithium-ion
- Electric range: More than 30 mi (48 km)

Dimensions
- Wheelbase: 2,636 mm (103.8 in)
- Length: 4,521 mm (178.0 in)
- Width: 1,840 mm (72.4 in)
- Height: 1,620 mm (63.8 in)
- Curb weight: 1,600–1,875 kg (3,527–4,134 lb)

The Dodge Hornet is a compact crossover SUV marketed by Dodge exclusively in North America from the 2023 through 2025 model years. Produced in Italy, it is a rebadged, restyled variant of the Alfa Romeo Tonale at a lower price. The all-wheel-drive vehicle was positioned as the brand's smallest and most affordable model, its first plug-in hybrid, and its first new model since 2011. Due to slow sales and the impact of the Second Trump Administration's new 25% tariff on imports, the Hornet was discontinued after the 2025 model year.

== The Hornet name ==
The Dodge Hornet model name is a legacy trademark which originated with the Hudson Hornet (1951–1957), a full-size car that gained fame due to its dominance in NASCAR stock car racing in the early 1950s, earning a legendary status that was later popularized in the film Cars. After the merger of Hudson and Nash to form American Motors Corporation (AMC), the name was applied for their compact car line (1970–1977) that served as a platform for several other successful AMC vehicles. Chrysler Corporation acquired AMC in 1987, and gained ownership of the Hornet trademark. The name appeared in 2006 for the Dodge Hornet concept car, a small, five-door mini-MPV to gauge interest in a B-segment vehicle for the European market. In 2020, FCA (Stellantis) submitted an application to the U.S. Patent and Trademark Office to reserve the names "Dodge Hornet" and "Hornet". Dodge chose the historic name as a nod to its long-running family lineage for the compact crossover SUV.

== Overview ==
The Hornet was revealed in August 2022 as a 2023 model year vehicle. It was Dodge's first all-new model in over a decade, following the discontinuation of the mid-size Journey crossover, and its compact SUV since the discontinuation of the Jeep Liberty-based Dodge Nitro in 2011. The vehicle's exterior design was led by Jeff Gale, the son of former Chrysler design executive Tom Gale.

The Hornet was manufactured at the Stellantis factory in Pomigliano d'Arco, Italy, alongside its platform mate, the Alfa Romeo Tonale. It is structurally based on the Stellantis Small Wide 4x4 LWB platform, which is also utilized by the Jeep Compass (MP). The Hornet was offered exclusively with all-wheel-drive (AWD) and sold exclusively in the North American market, distinguishing it from the Tonale, which offers front-wheel-drive and is marketed in other global markets.

The Dodge Hornet was available in four trim levels: GT (entry-level), GT Plus (entry-level with luxury trim), R/T (plug-in hybrid), and R/T Plus (plug-in hybrid with luxury trim). The GT trims were available with the 2.0 L I4 engine and a nine-speed automatic transmission producing 268 hp (200 kW; 272 PS), while the R/T trim was the first plug-in hybrid vehicle (PHEV) marketed by Dodge and featured dual electric motors mated to a 1.3 L I4 and a six-speed automatic for a total of 288 hp (215 kW; 292 PS).

The Hornet also had different specifications, pricing, and features compared to the Tonale. According to Dodge, the Hornet R/T has a range of over 30 miles (48 km). Equipped with the 2.0 L turbocharged engine in the GT trim, the Hornet can go from 0 to 60 mph (97 km/h) in 6.1 seconds, while the R/T trim with a 1.3 L I4 also features a "PowerShot" mode, which delivers a temporary boost of 25 hp (19 kW; 25 PS), to achieve a 0 to 60 mph acceleration in 5.6 seconds.

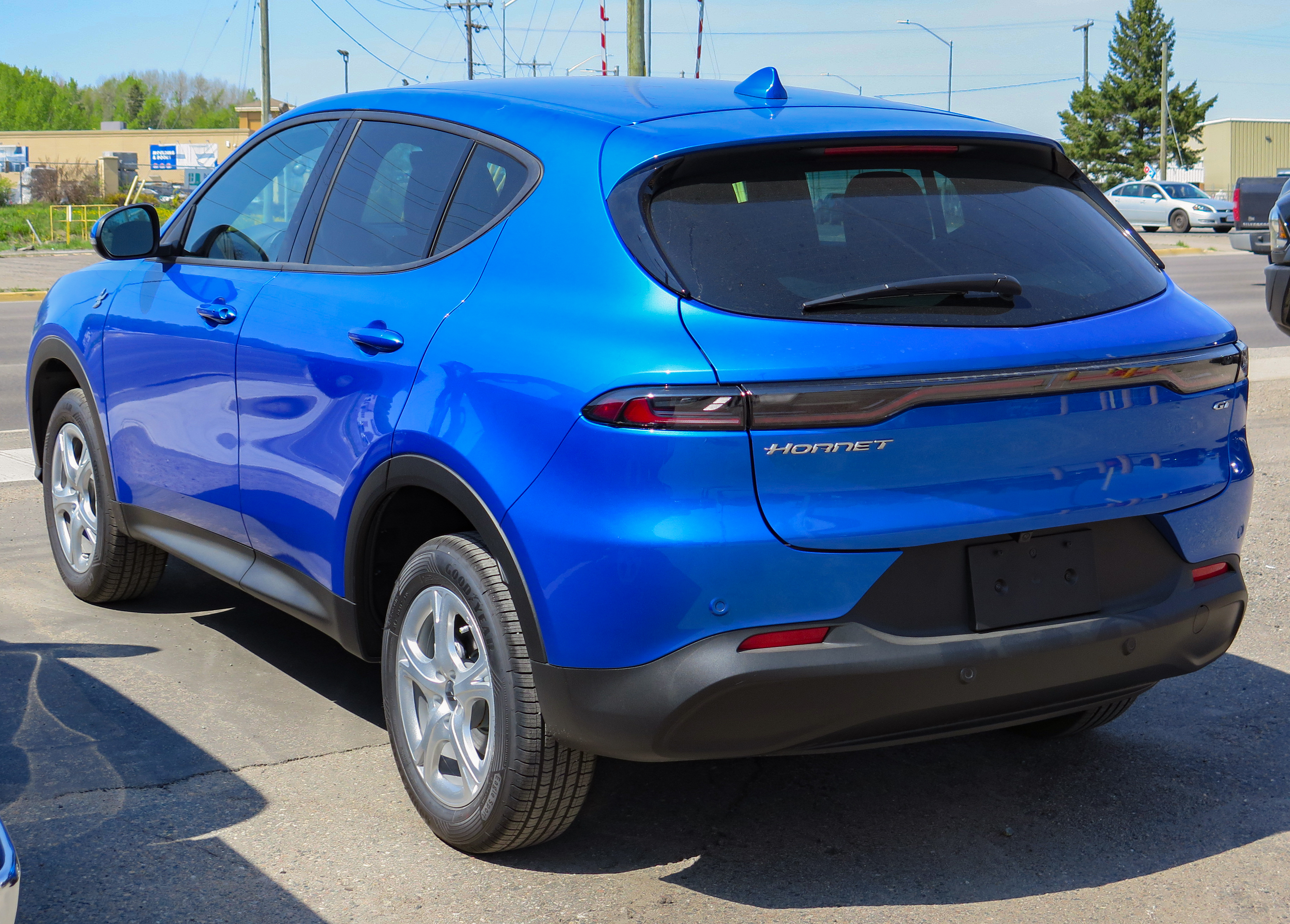
Rear view

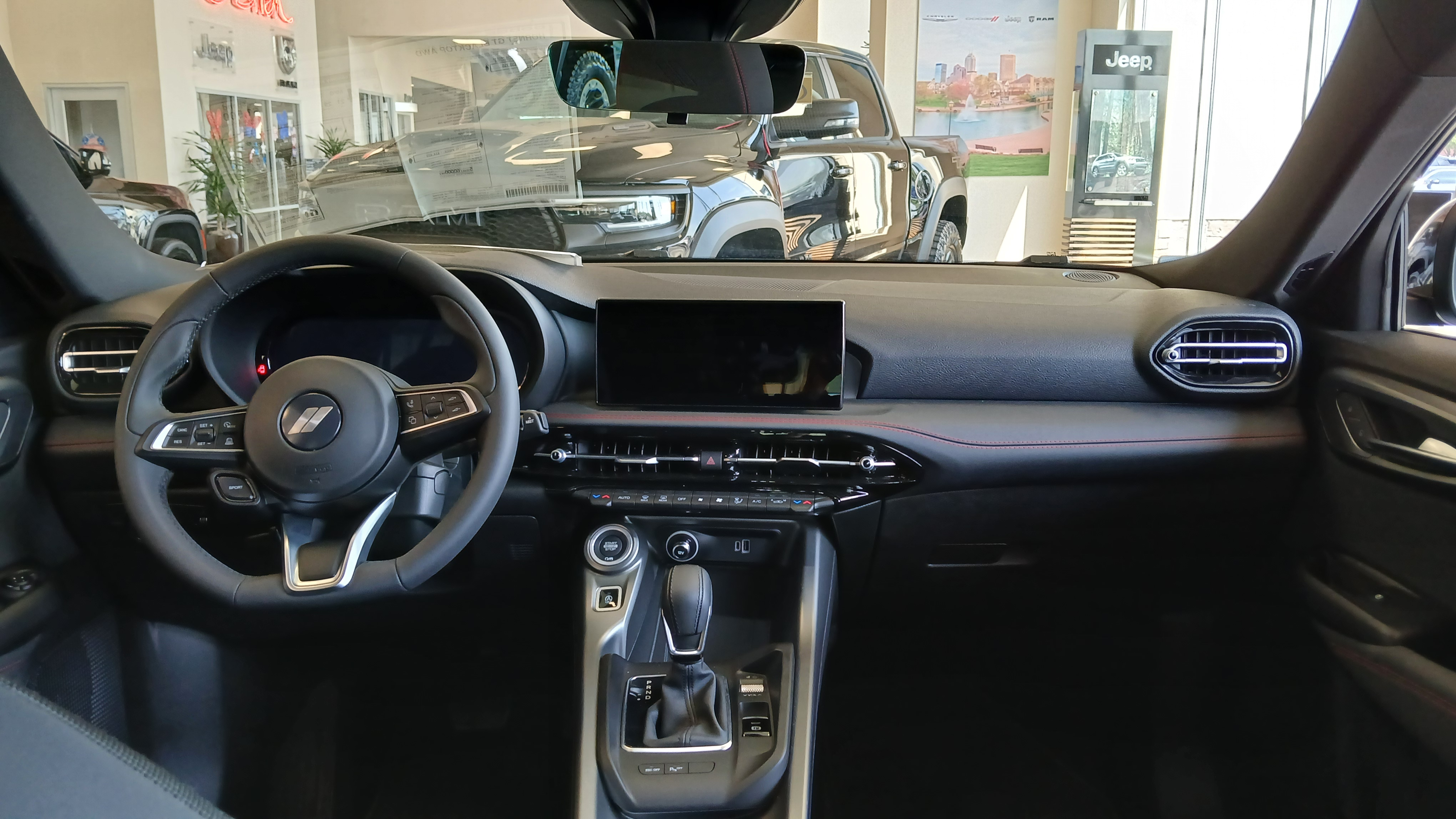
Interior

== Equipment ==
The base GT includes 17-inch aluminum wheels, rain-sensing windshield wipers, and dual-zone automatic climate control. All models feature the Stellantis Uconnect 5 infotainment system, with a 10.3-inch touchscreen and a 12.3-inch digital gauge display. Included are wireless Apple CarPlay and Android Auto features, as well as Amazon Alexa connectivity. The GT Plus adds a 14-speaker Harman Kardon stereo and in-dash navigation. Standard driver-assistance features include automated emergency braking with pedestrian and cyclist detection, blind-spot monitoring, and parking sensors.

The optional Tech package adds adaptive cruise control with lane centering. The Cold Weather Group package combines heated seats, a heated steering wheel, and remote start. Black cloth and synthetic leather upholstery with red stitching is standard on the GT, while the GT Plus trim comes with leather. The optional Track package includes imitation suede or a red leather interior.

== 2025 models ==
Minor changes for 2025 included redesigned LED headlights and two new exterior color options. The available Track package for 2025 includes steering-wheel shift paddles. This helps position the Hornet as a car for driving enthusiasts and buyers are provided with a one-day course at Dodge's official driving school. A Car and Driver road test of a GT Plus resulted in 0 to 60 mph in 5.7 seconds, which was 0.2 seconds slower than achieved in a test of the more powerful and more expensive Hornet R/T Plus. The 2025 R/T trim received an extended electric range. A new 11.5-inch infotainment touchscreen debuted on the Plus trims, featuring improved graphics and faster touch response times.

== Effect of tariffs ==
Despite its American badging, the Hornet was produced in Italy along with the Alfa Romeo Tonale. Motor Trend magazine noted that to keep prices low, Dodge reduced content in some areas. However, the imposition of U.S. President Trump's tariffs resulted in the suspension of Hornet production in August 2025. This was because a 25% import tariff that was introduced in July 2025.

At that time, the future of the vehicle was uncertain, with the possibility of it skipping the 2026 model year. In September 2025, the head of Dodge, Matt McAlear, noted he would "like to see the compact SUV return to the U.S. someday as the tariff landscape evolves". Nevertheless, after production was stopped in 2025 "amid all the tumultuous tariff policies," Dodge announced in January 2026 that it would end production of the Hornet.

== Powertrain ==
Powertrain (all models)
| Spec Model | Power | Torque | Top speed | Transmission | Acceleration (0-60/100) | Propulsion type | Battery | Powertrain layout | Displacement | Model years |
|---|---|---|---|---|---|---|---|---|---|---|
| GT | 268 hp (200 kW; 272 PS) at 6600 | 295 lb⋅ft (400 N⋅m) at 4600 | 225 km/h (140 mph) | 9-speed automatic | 6.5 sec | Petrol | — | Front-engine, four-wheel-drive | 122 cu in (2.0 L; 1,999.2 cc) | 2023-2025 |
| R/T | 288 hp (215 kW; 292 PS) at 6000 | 383 lb⋅ft (519 N⋅m) at 4400 | 206 km/h (128 mph) | 6-speed automatic | 5.6 sec | Hybrid | 15.5 kWh lithium-ion | Front-engine, four-wheel-drive | 81 cu in (1.3 L; 1,327.4 cc) | 2023-2025 |

== Hornet GLH ==
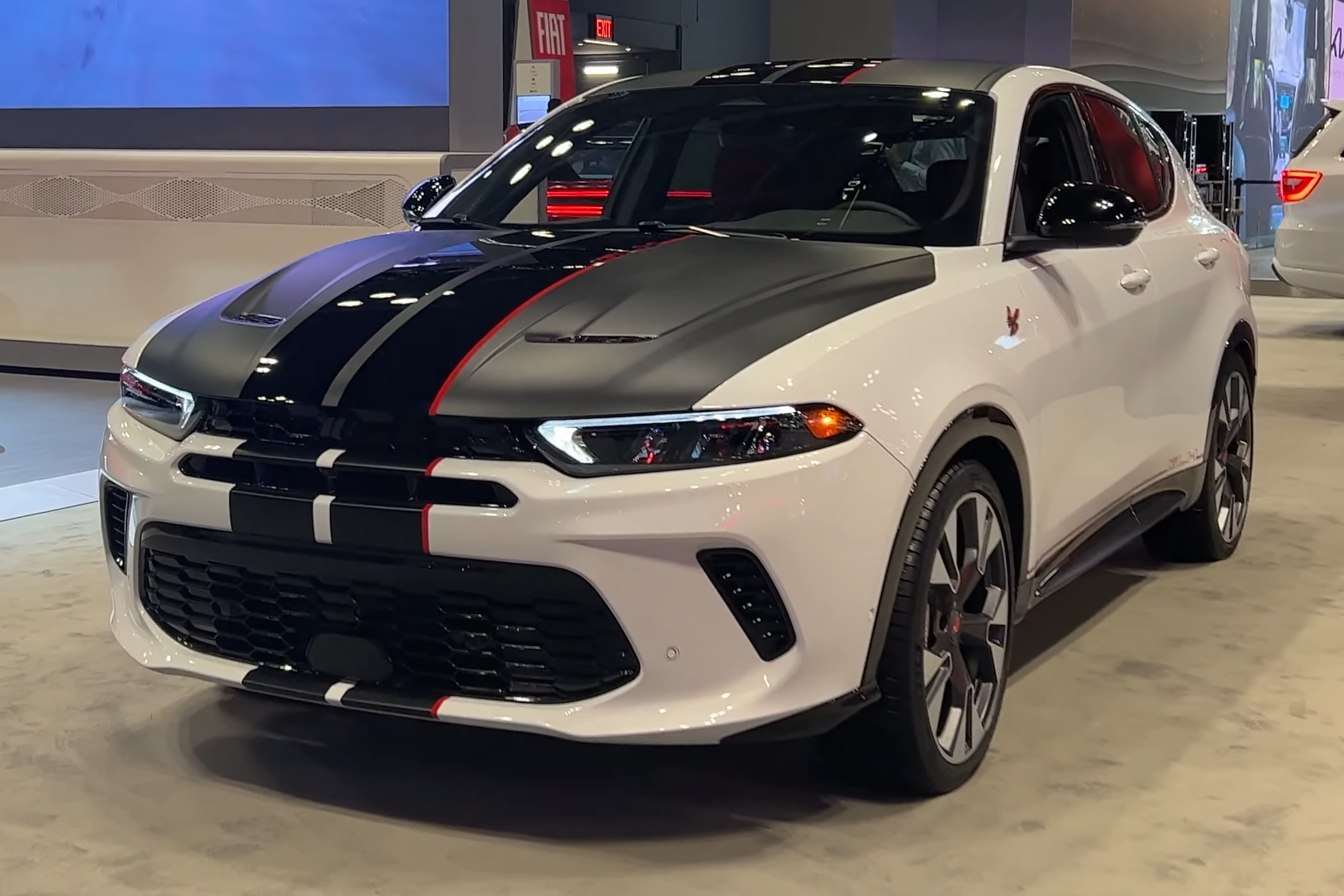
2023 Hornet GT GLH Concept

The launch of the production Hornet line in August 2022 also included two concept cars labeled GLH based on the base GT and hybrid R/T trims. Both featured increasing "stage kits" for power and lowered suspensions. The model designation was a gesture to continuing the legacy of Dodge Omni GLH and Shelby GLH-S that were developed in cooperation with Carroll Shelby from 1983 until 1986.

In late 2022, Dodge CEO Timothy Kuniskis announced plans for the more powerful model. The Hornet R/T GLH was unveiled on March 22, 2023, featuring visual upgrades, such as lowered springs, 20-inch wheels, unique graphics, and a louder exhaust.

Plans were to offer the various tuner parts through Dodge's Direct Connection aftermarket parts department. In a January 2025 interview, Dodge's CEO Matt McAlear, stated that the Hornet GLH model would enter production in late 2025, with the timing suggesting it would be a 2026 model.

== Motorsports ==
Dodge Hornet R/T FC1-X
- Category: Nitrocross
- Predecessor: Dodge Dart Rally Cross

Technical specifications
- Engine: 4 Electric motors M4
- Transmission: Direct Drive
- Power: 800.0 kilowatts (1,072.8 bhp; 1,087.7 PS); 1,100.0 pound-feet (1,491.4 N⋅m)
- Weight: 1,550.0 lb (703 kg)

Competition history
- Notable drivers: Andreas Bakkerud, Lia Block, Robin Larsson, and Fraser McConnell
| Races | Wins | Podiums |
|---|---|---|
| 10 | 2 | 6 |

The Dodge Hornet R/T FC1-X is a rally race car that only shares the headlights and grille with the production version of the Hornet crossover. The chassis is the FC1-X, common across all the teams in the classification.

Dodge developed four Hornet R/T FC1-X cars to campaign in the 2024-2025 season of Nitrocross ten-race tour. It is in partnership with the Dreyer & Reinbold Racing team.

The specially-prepared cars are in Group E, the highest class, featuring an all-wheel-drive with four axial flux electric motors producing 1,072 horsepower (799 kW; 1,087 PS). The cars are rated to accelerate from 0 to 60 mph in 1.4 seconds achieving almost 2g of from the standing start. The rally cars race on circuits that combine dirt and asphalt surfaces, along with 200-foot (61 m) gap jumps.

== Sales ==
The majority of Hornet sales have been the plug-in hybrid (R/T) variety.

| Year | United States | Canada |
|---|---|---|
| 2023 | 9,336 | 2,052 |
| 2024 | 20,559 | 2,371 |
| 2025 | 9,365 | 1,690 |
