= Toyota Motor China =

Chinese subsidiary company of Toyota Motor Corporation

Toyota Motor (China) Investment Co., Ltd. (TMCI)
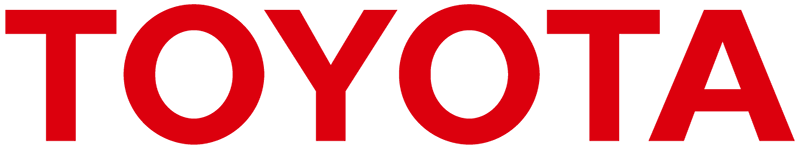
- Native name: 丰田汽车（中国）投资有限公司
- Type: Subsidiary
- Industry: Automotive
- Genre: Motor cars
- Founded: July 2001; 25 years ago
- Headquarters: Beijing, China
- Key people: Ueda Tatsuro (Chairman); Li Hui (President)
- Products: Automobiles
- Owner: Toyota Motor Corporation (100%)
- Website: www.toyota.com.cn

Toyota Motor (China) Investment Co., Ltd. (TMCI) is an investment subsidiary of Japanese multinational automotive manufacturer Toyota Motor Corporation in the People's Republic of China, established in July 2001. The company is responsible for investment activities such as production and R&D in China and as well as the import and distribution of Lexus and Toyota brand vehicles, and related business activities such as marketing network construction, training, and market promotion.

== History ==
In September 1964, Toyota Motor Corporation exported the Crown model to China for the first time. In October 1980, Toyota established its Beijing representative office in China.In December 1998, Sichuan Toyota Motor Co., Ltd. (FAW Toyota (Chengdu)) was established. In June 2000, Tianjin Toyota Motor Co., Ltd. (FAW Toyota) was established.

Toyota Motor (China) Investment Co., Ltd. was established in July 2001. In September 2004, Guangzhou Toyota Motor Co., Ltd. (GAC Toyota) was established. In February 2005, Lexus opened its first dealership in China.

In 2019, Toyota further deepened its partnership with FAW Group and GAC Group, a Chinese state-owned automobile manufacturer in electrification and intelligent connectivity, provided hydrogen fuel cell (FC) components to commercial vehicle manufacturers, and reached cooperation agreements with multiple companies on mobility services and the popularization of electrification.

Toyota Motor Corporation and the Shanghai Municipal Government signed a strategic cooperation agreement on 22 April 2025, The deal's centrepiece is a wholly-owned Lexus electric vehicle factory to be built in Shanghai's Jinshan District and begin production in 2027.

== Subsidiaries ==
=== Beijing ===
- Toyota Motor Finance (China) Co., Ltd. (TMFCN)
- FAW Toyota Motor Sales Co., Ltd. (FTMS)
- Toyota Intelligent Electric Vehicle R&D Center (China) Co., Ltd.

=== Shanghai ===
- Lexus (Shanghai) New Energy Co., Ltd.
- Toyota Motor Technology Research & Development (Shanghai) Co., Ltd. (TTRS-SH)

=== Guangzhou ===
- Toyota Motor Technology Research & Exchange (Guangzhou) Co., Ltd.
- GAC Toyota Motor Co., Ltd. (GTMC)
- GAC Toyota Engine Co., Ltd. (GTE)

=== Tianjin ===
- Toyota Motor Technical Center (China) Co., Ltd. (TTCC)
- FAW Toyota Motor Co., Ltd. (FTMC)
- FAW Toyota Engine (Tianjin) Co., Ltd. (FTET)

=== Chengdu ===
- FAW Toyota Motor (Chengdu) Co., Ltd. (FTCC)

=== Changchun ===
- FAW Toyota Engine (Changchun) Co., Ltd. (FTEC)
- FAW Toyota Motor (Chengdu) Co., Ltd. Changchun Fengyue Branch (FTCF)

=== Shenzhen ===
- BYD Toyota Electric Vehicle Technology Co., Ltd. (BTET)

== Current Models ==
=== Manufactured locally Vehicles ===
==== FAW Toyota ====
===== TFTM (Tianjin Plant) =====
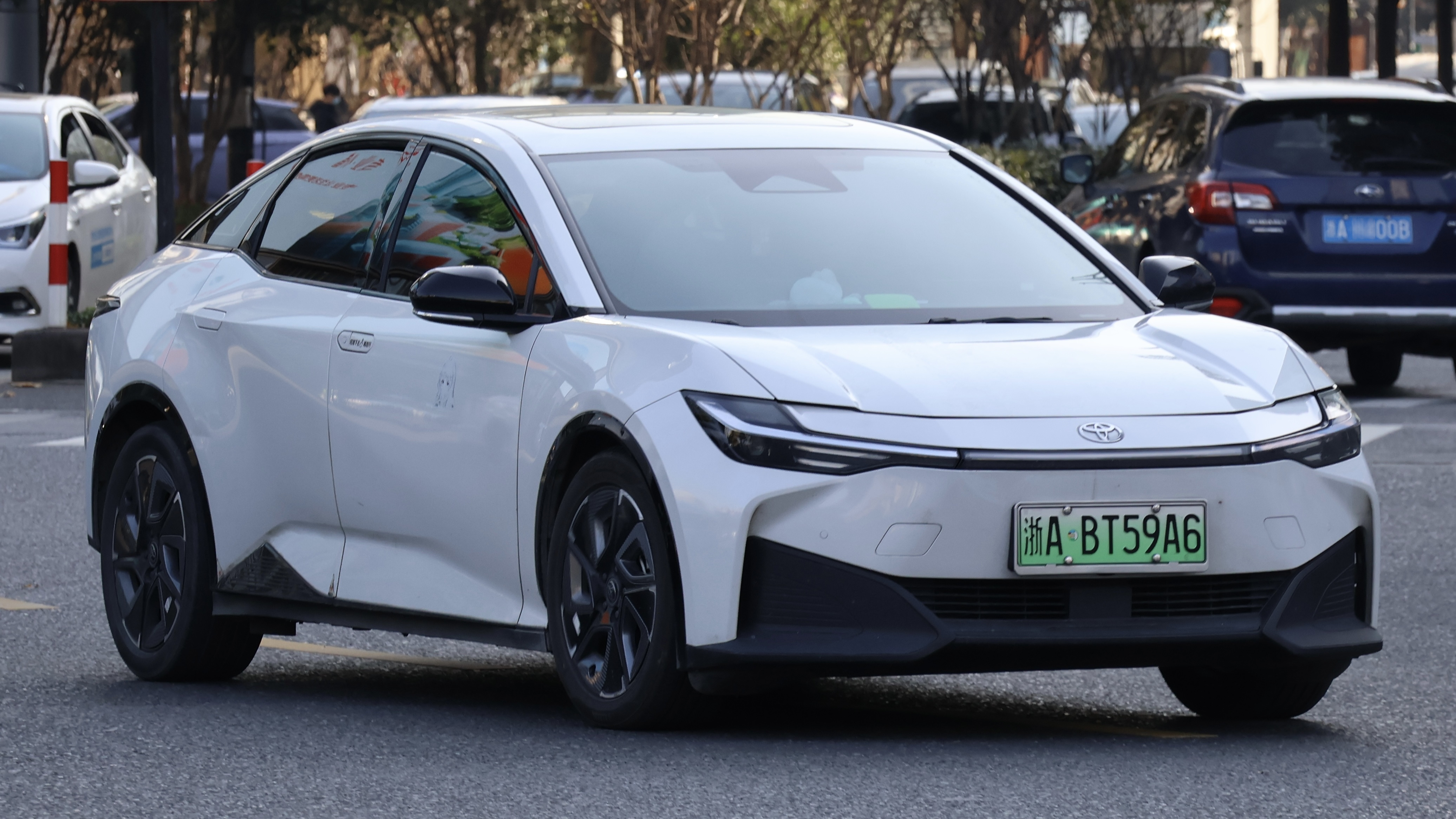
2023–present
丰田bZ3 EA10
Toyota bZ3 EA10

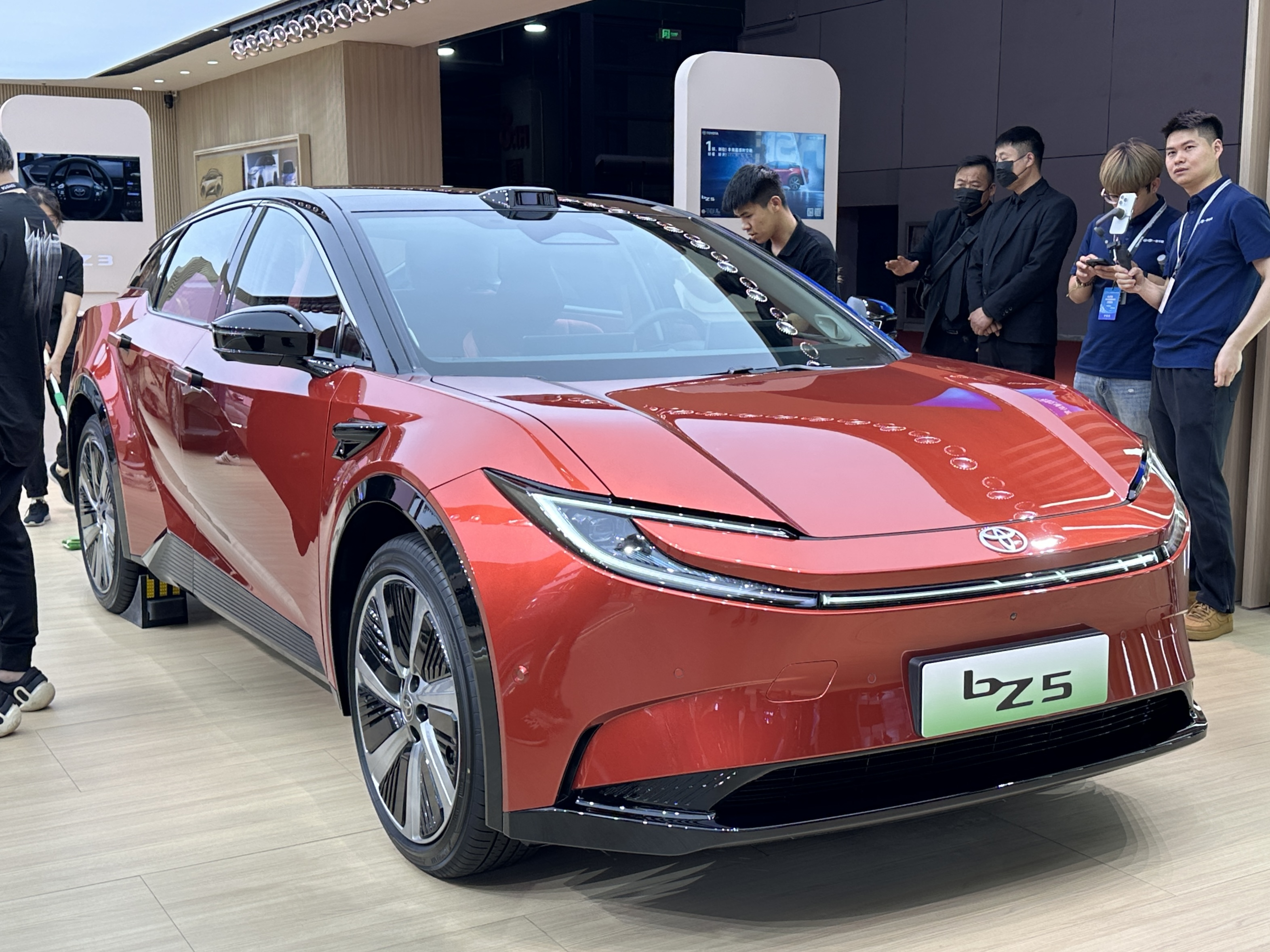
2025–present
丰田bZ5 EA11
Toyota bZ5 EA11

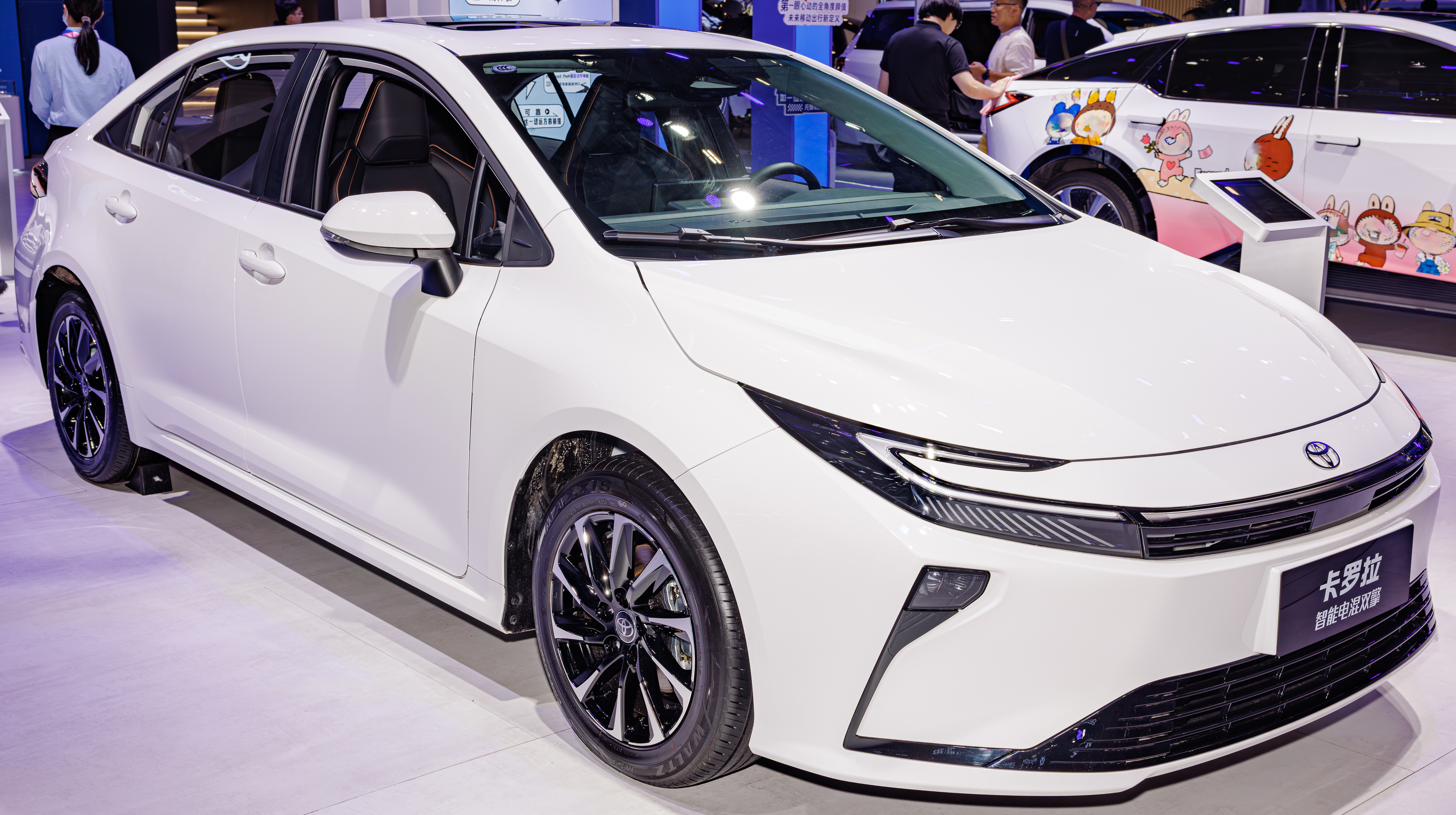
2025–present
丰田卡罗拉E210
Toyota Corolla E210

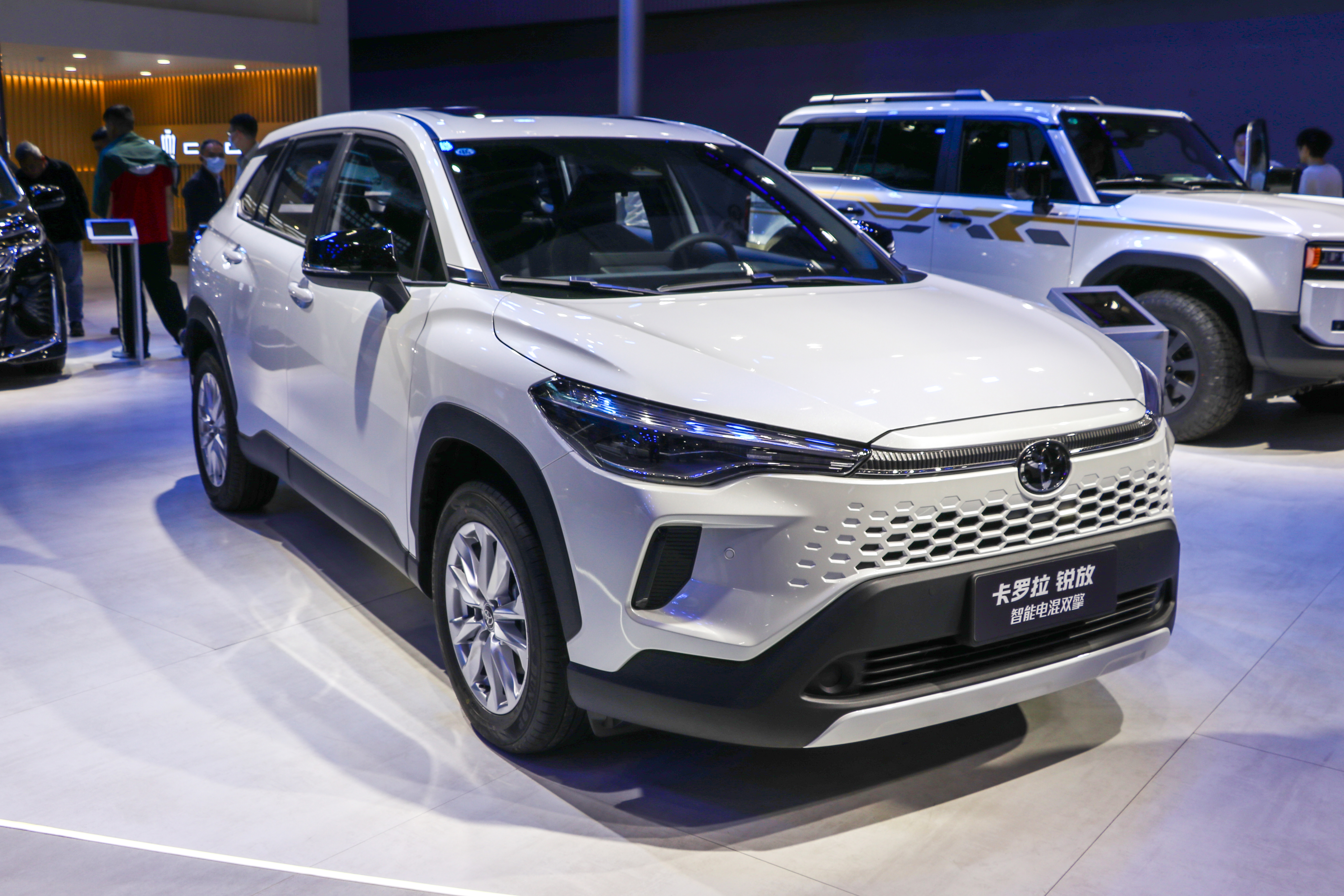
2025–present
丰田卡罗拉锐放XG10
Toyota Corolla Cross XG10

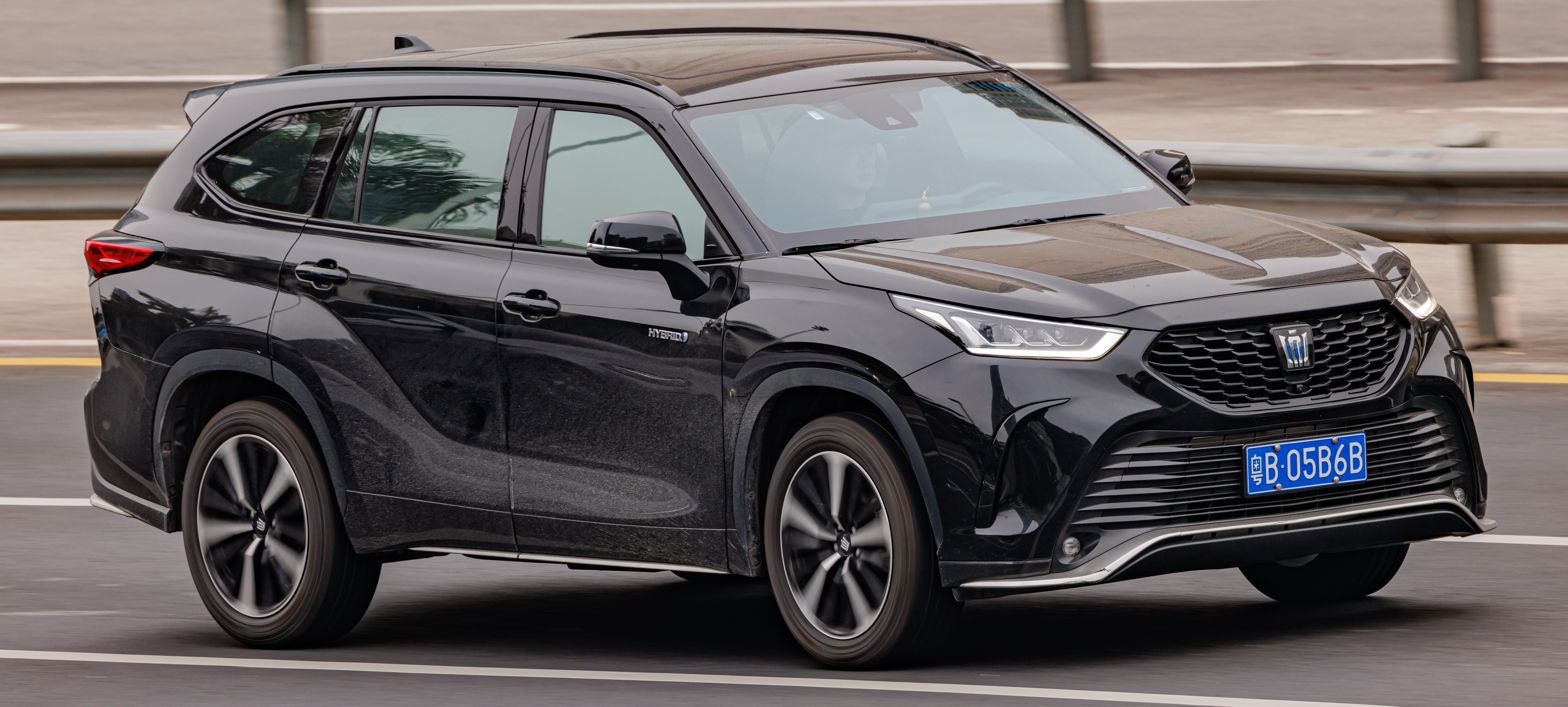
2021–present
丰田皇冠陆放XU70
Toyota Crown Kluger XU70

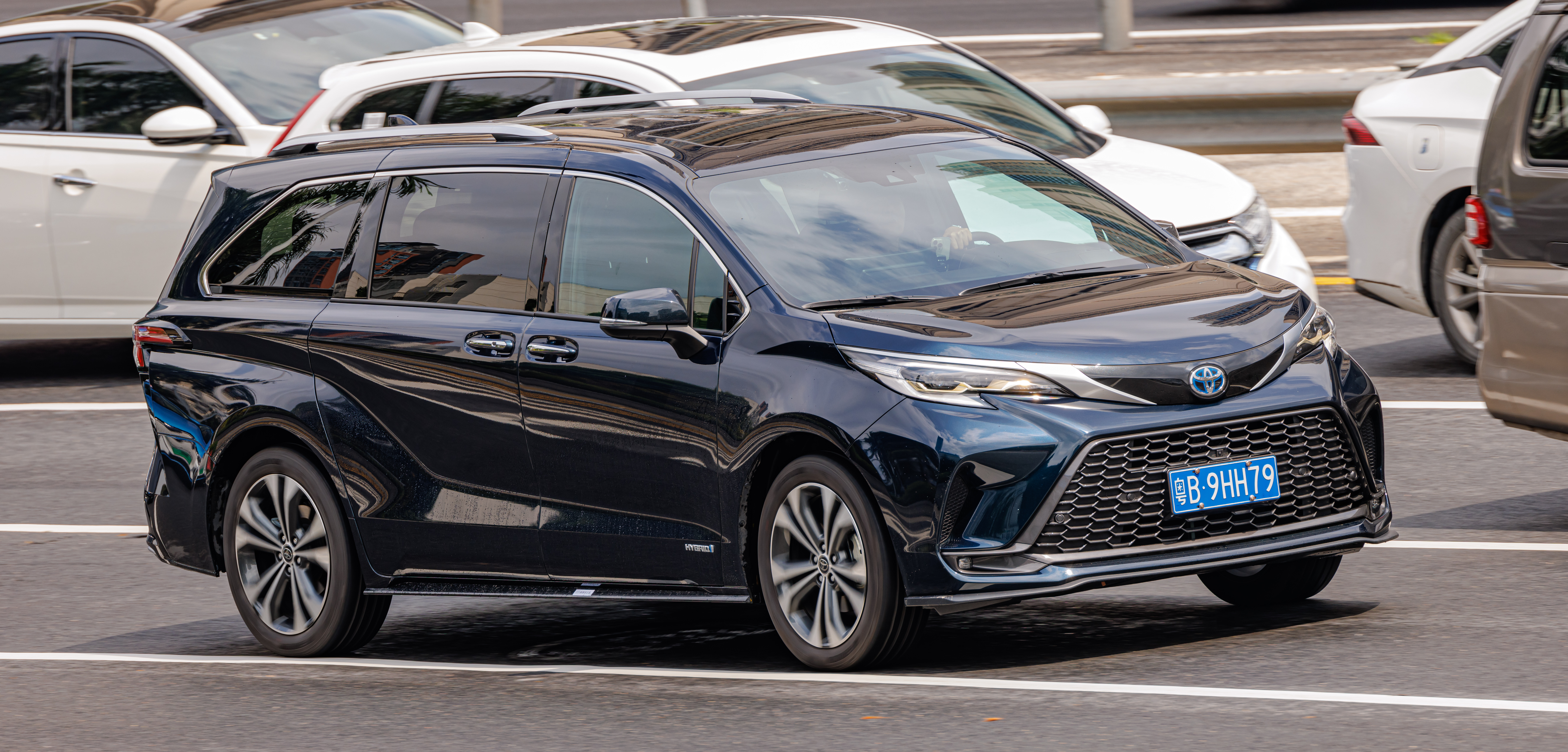
2022–present
丰田格瑞维亚XL40
Toyota Granvia XL40

===== SFTM Chengdu =====
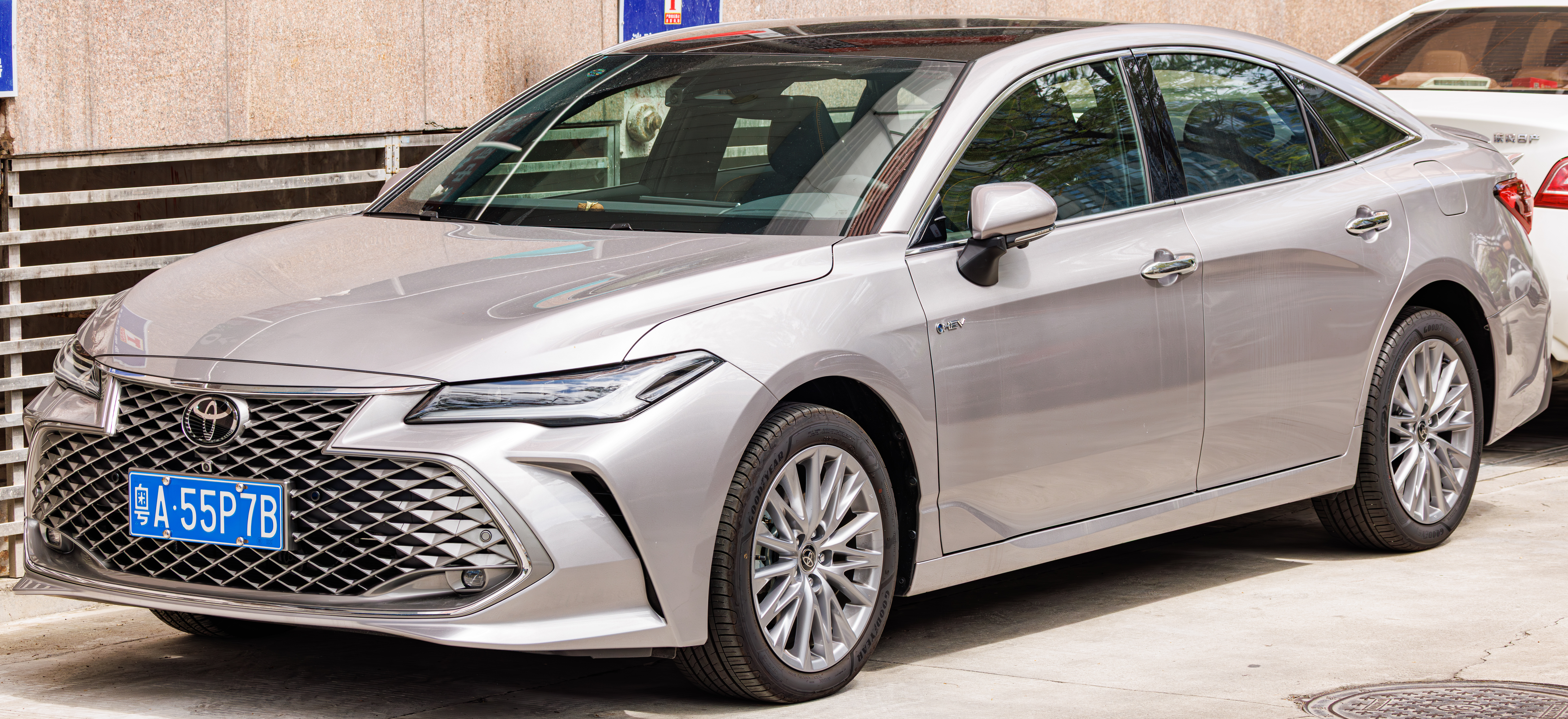
2021–present
丰田亚洲龙XX50
Toyota Avalon XX50

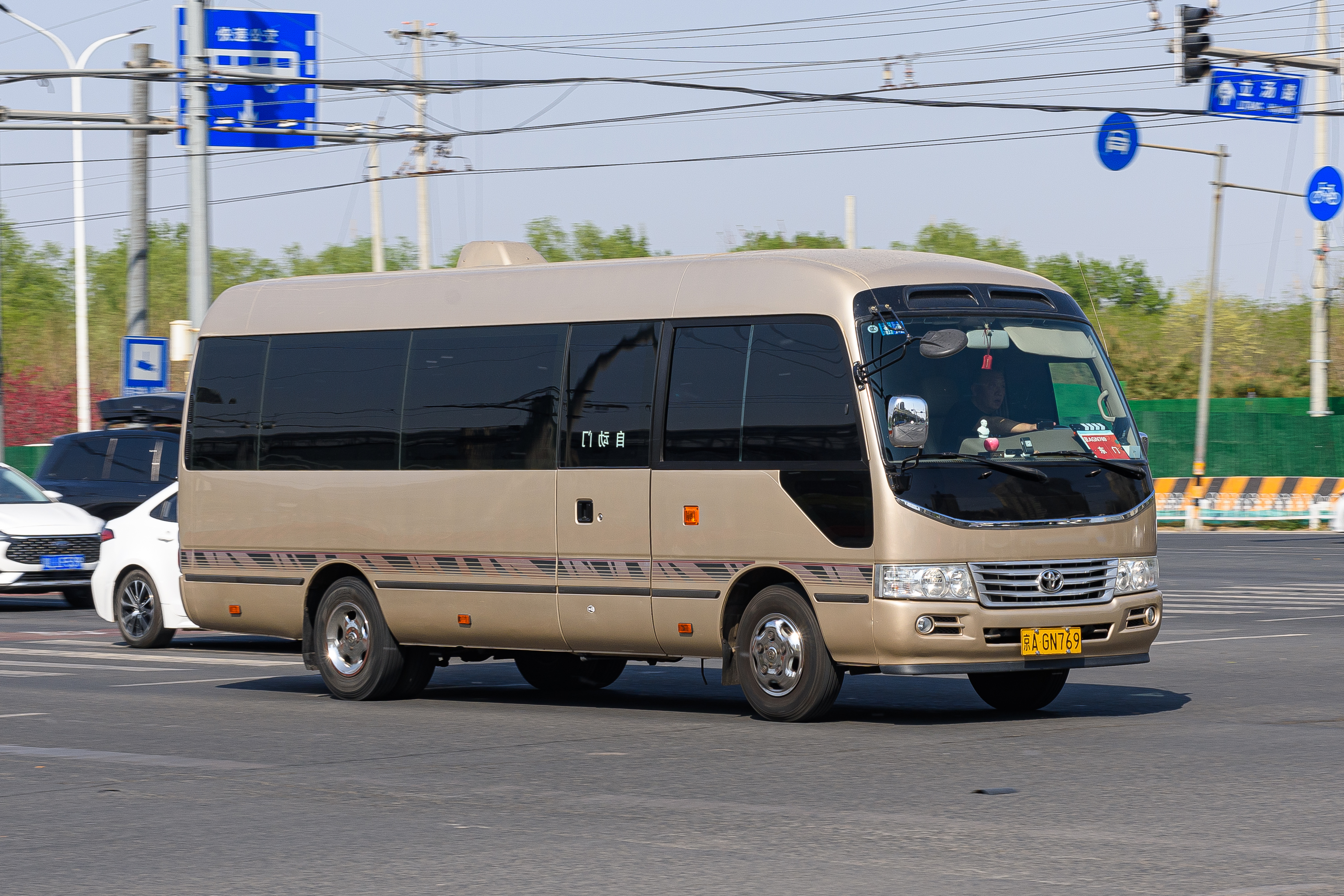
2007–present
丰田柯斯达B50
Toyota Coaster B50

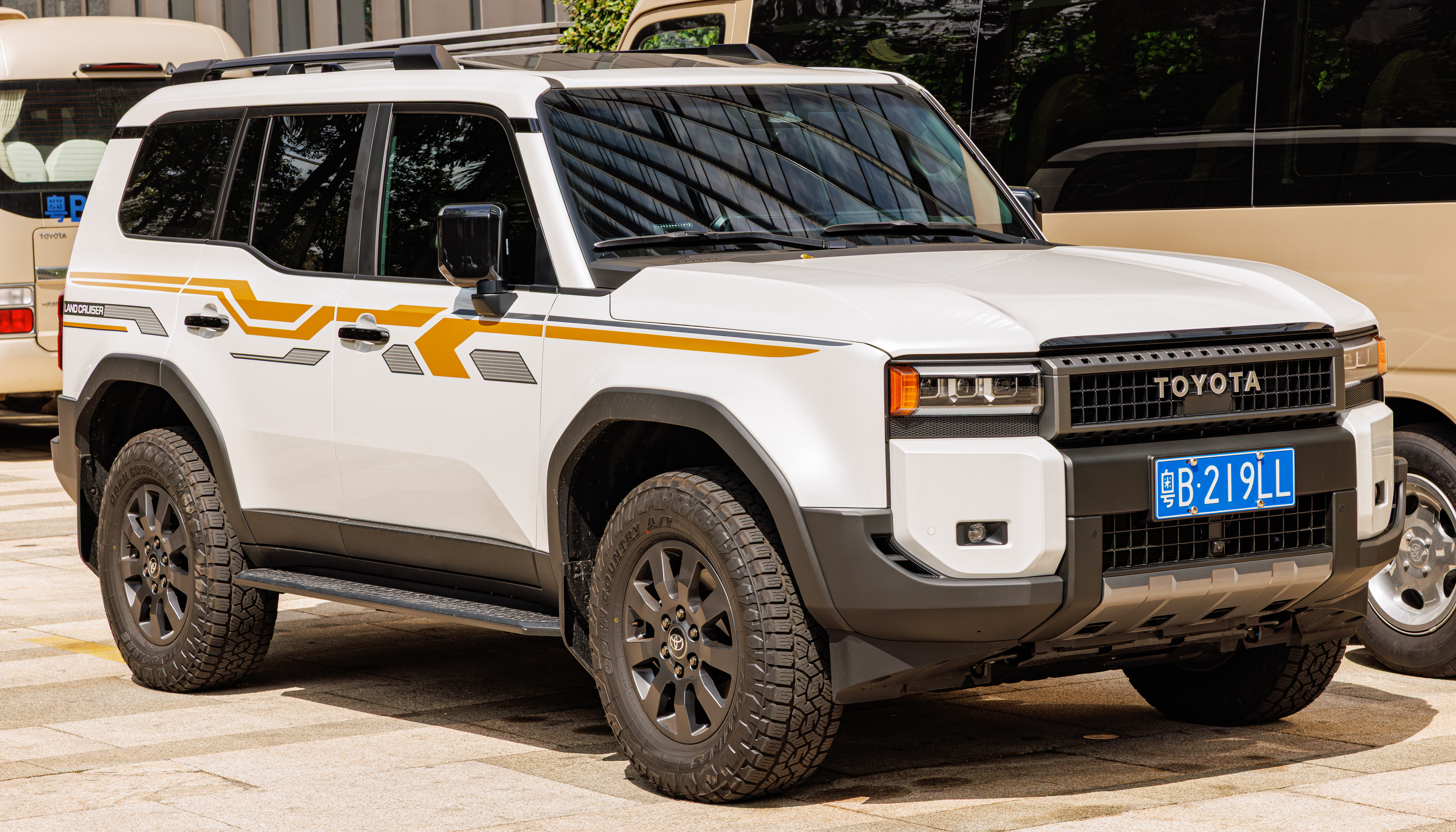
2024–present
丰田普拉多J250
Toyota Land Cruiser Prado J250

===== SFTM Changchun =====
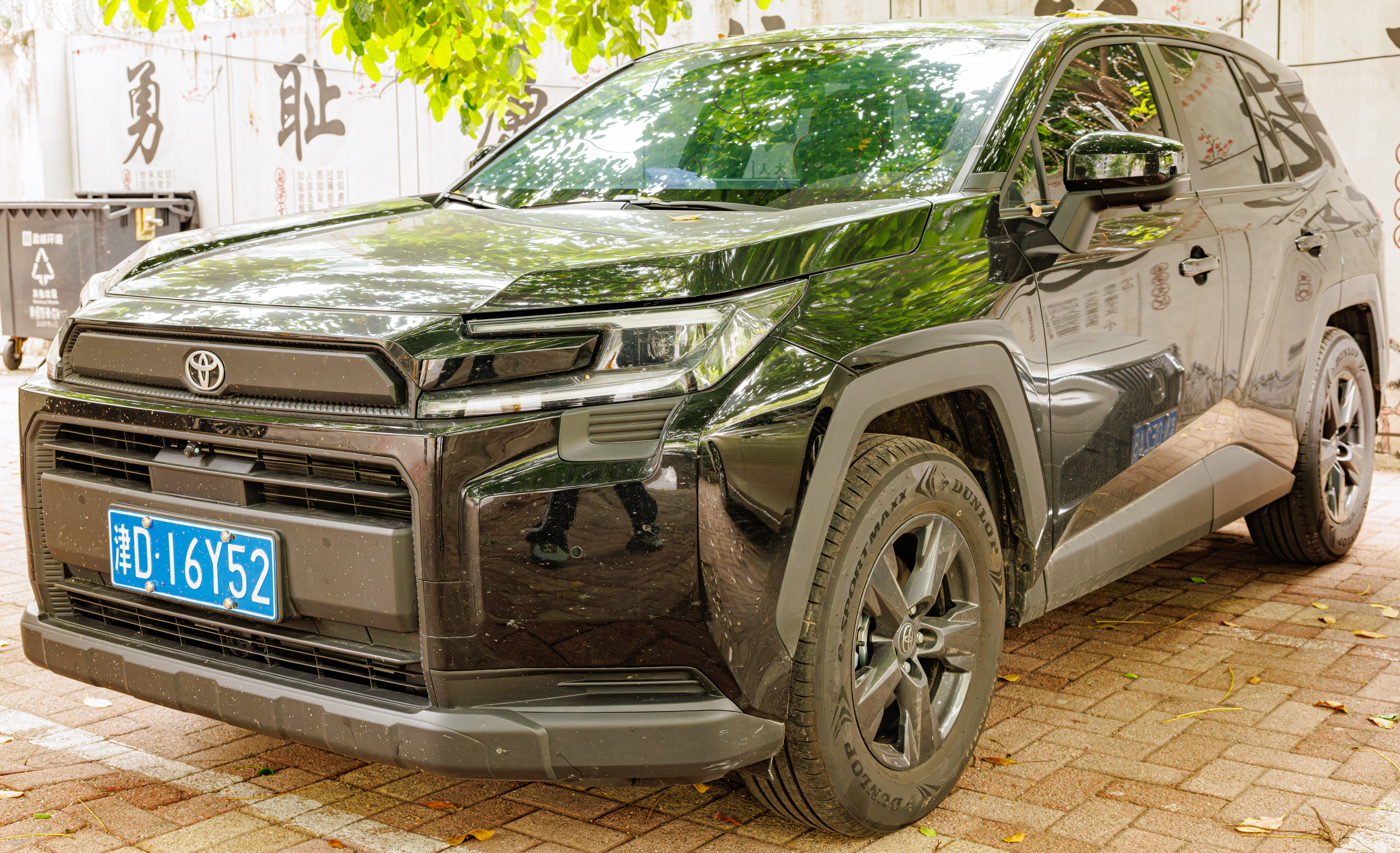
2025–present
丰田RAV4荣放XA60
Toyota RAV4 XA60

==== GAC Toyota ====
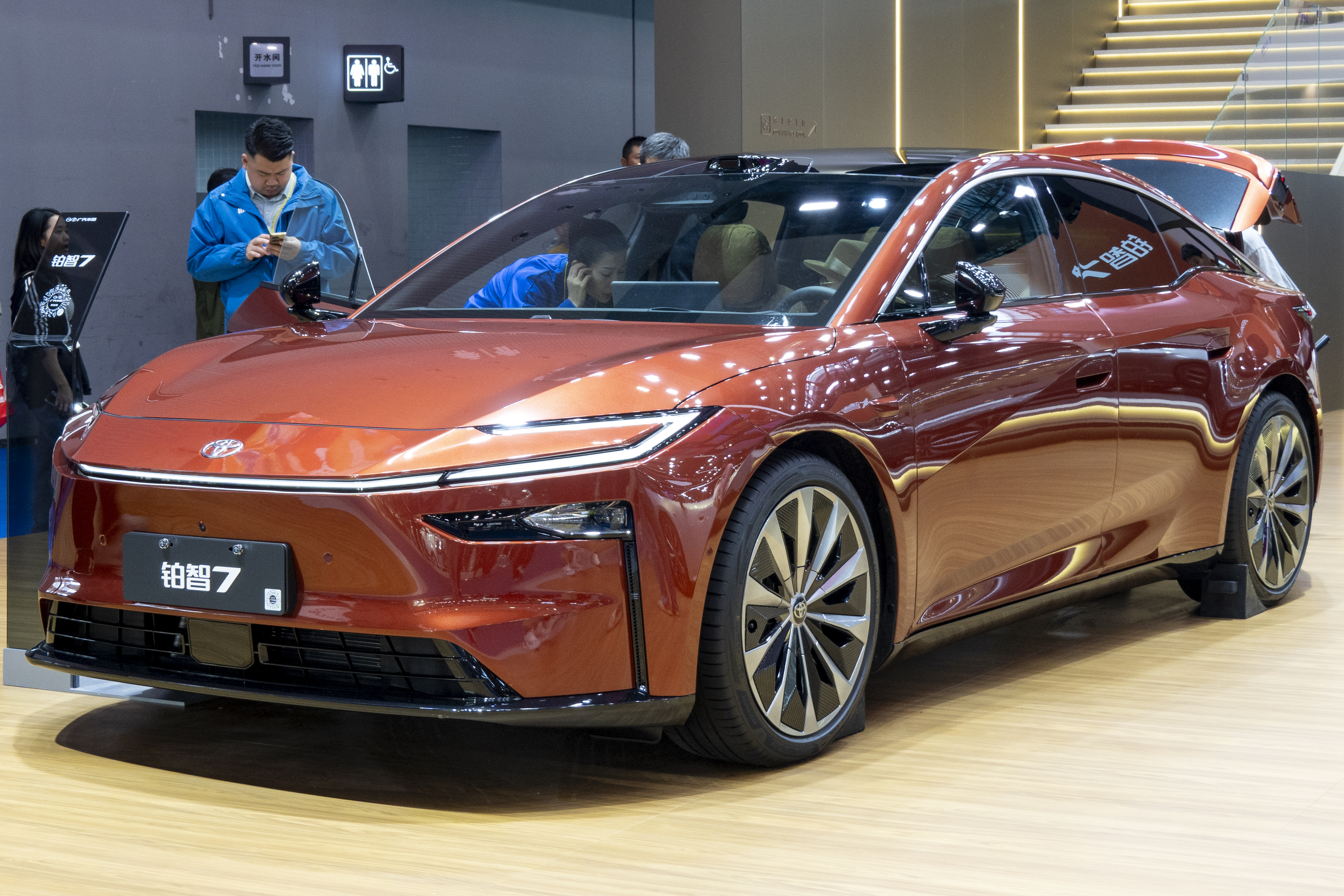
2026–present
丰田铂智7
Toyota bZ7

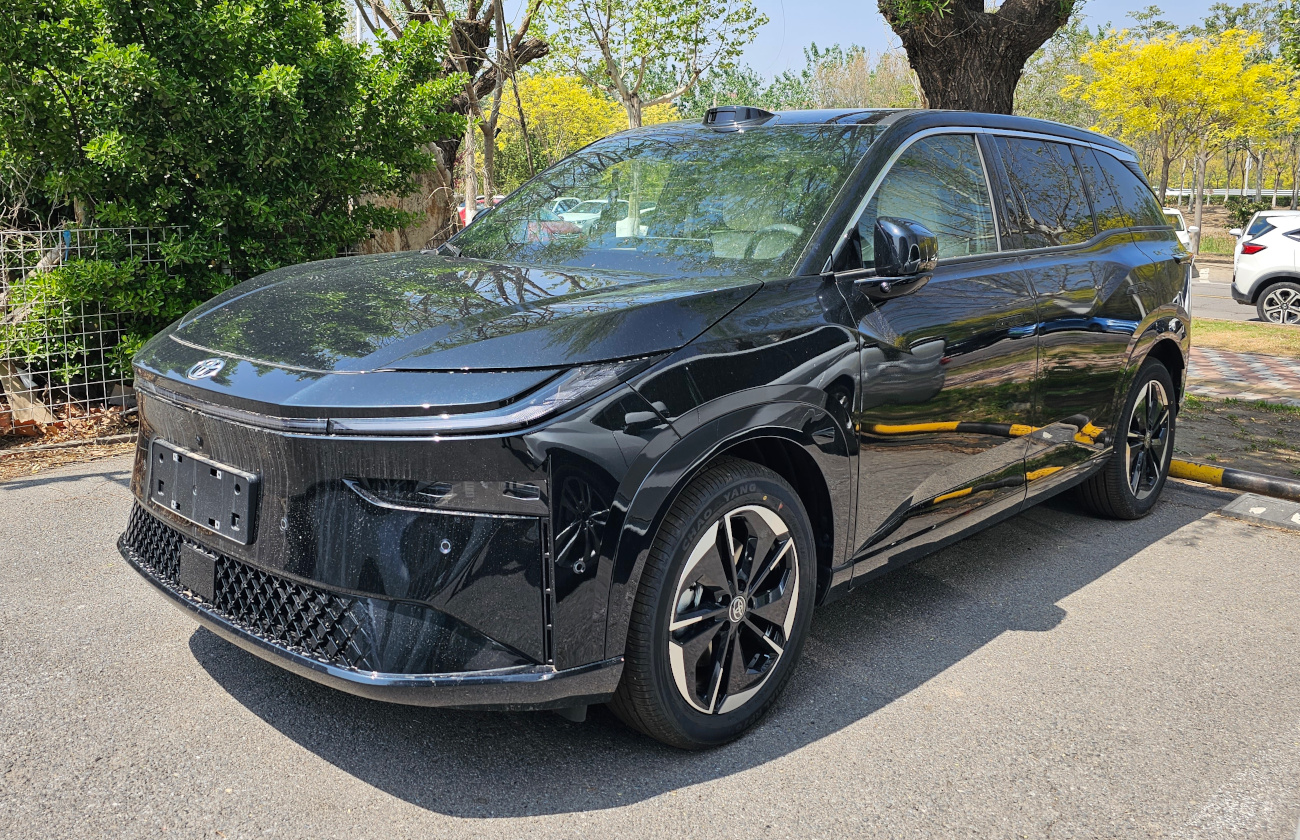
2025–present
丰田铂智3X EG10
Toyota bZ3X

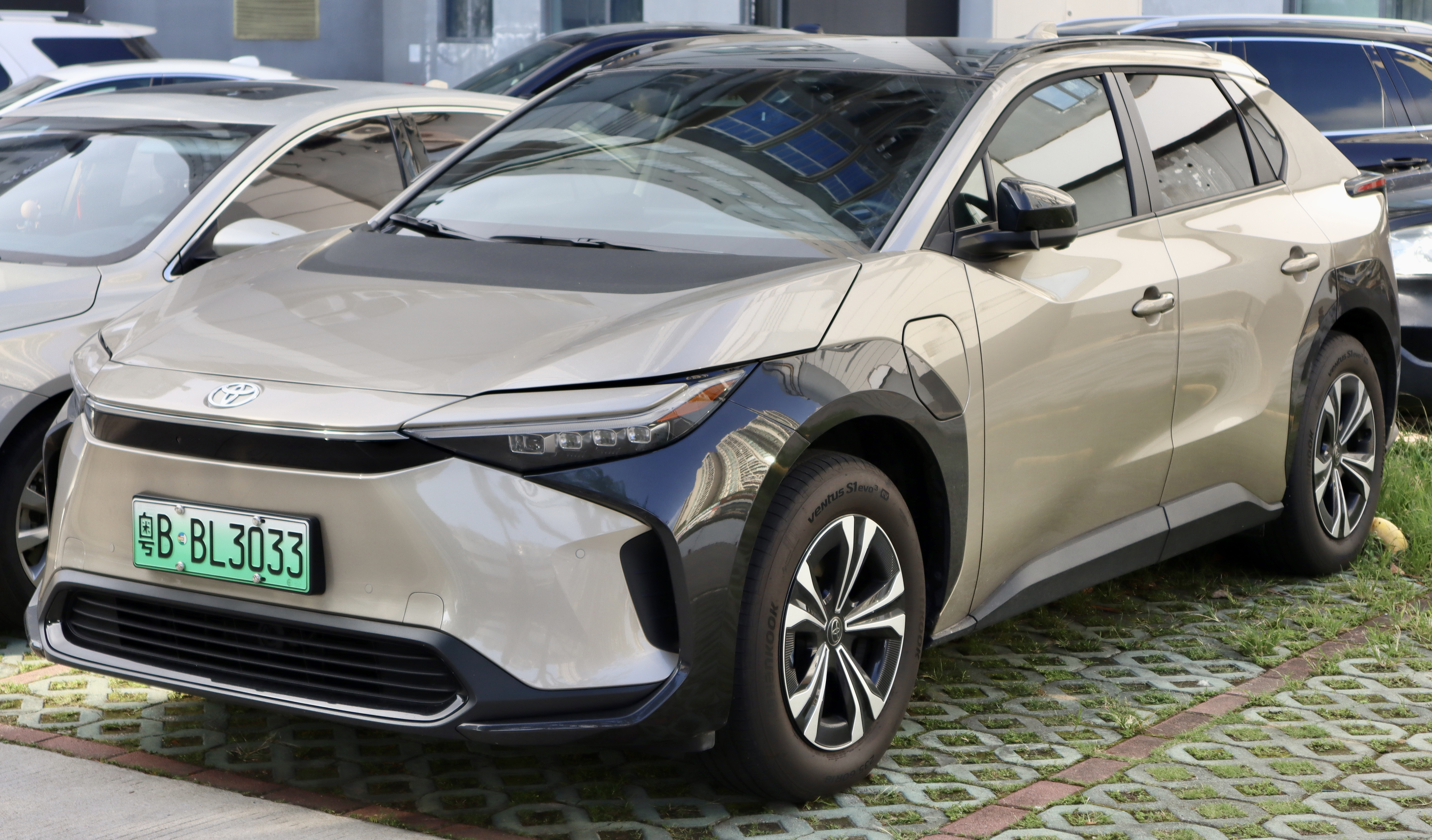
2022–present
丰田铂智4X EA10
Toyota bZ4X (GAC Toyota) EA10

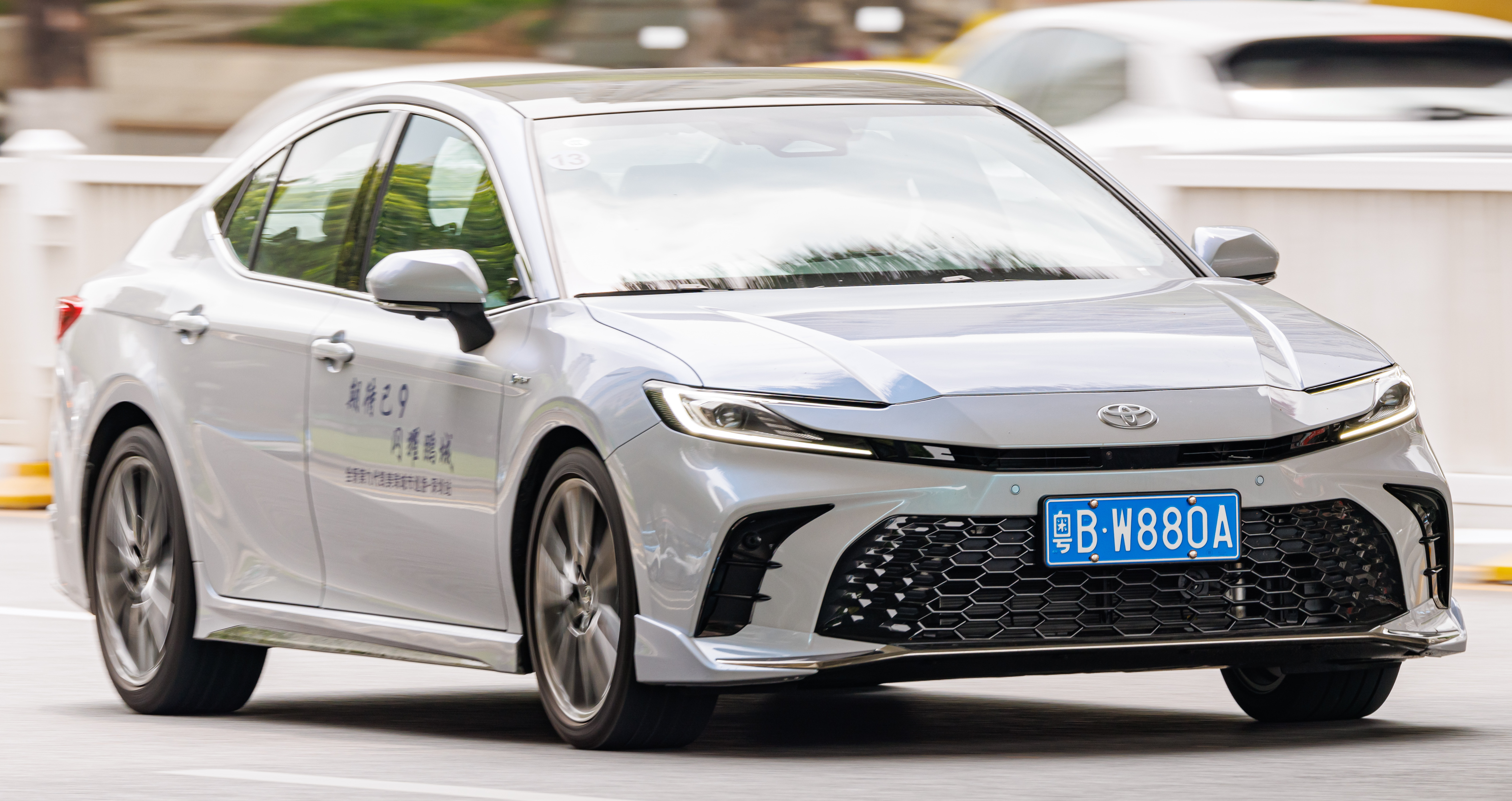
2023–present
丰田凯美瑞XV80
Toyota Camry XV80

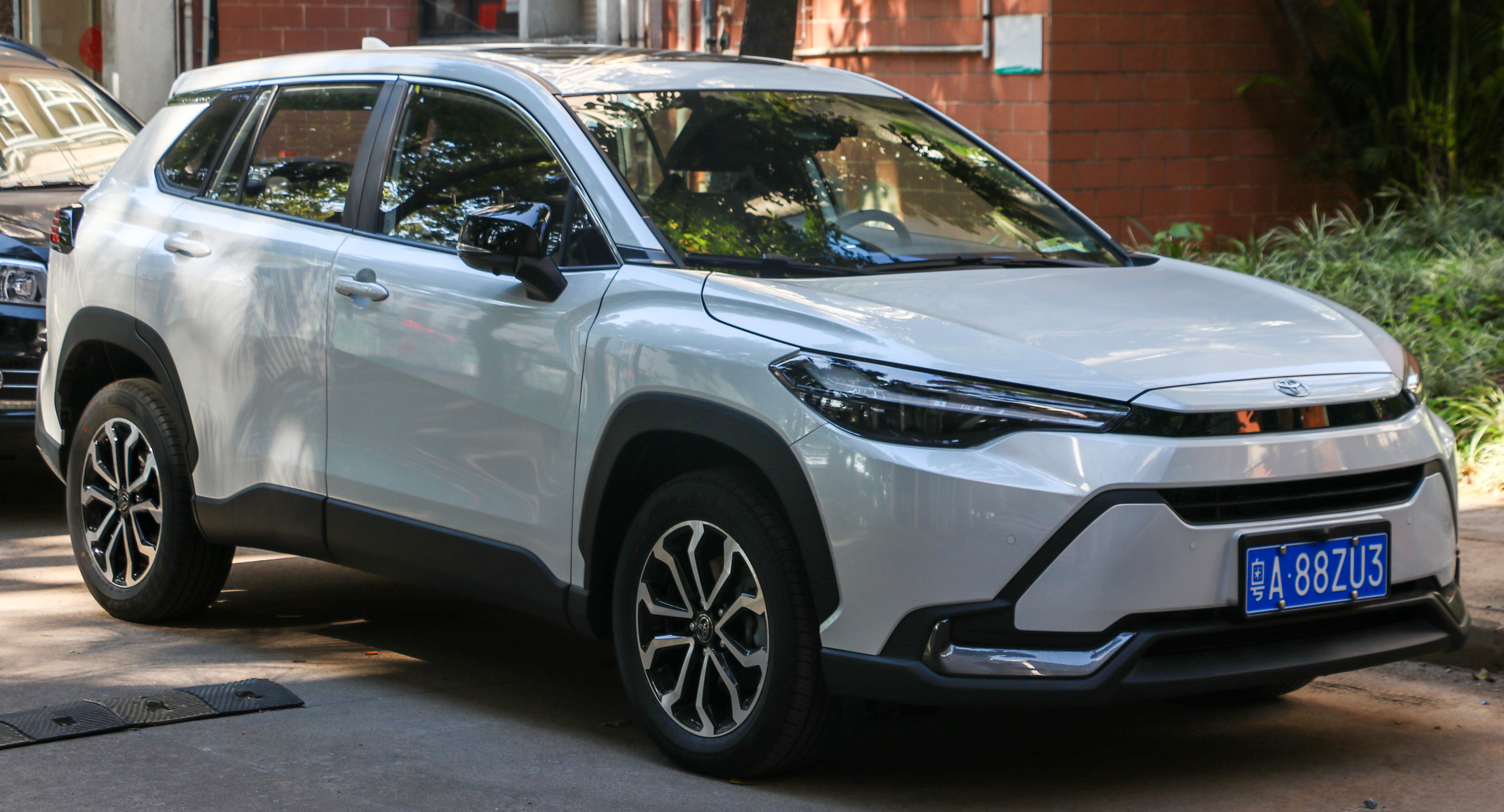
2025–present
丰田锋兰达
Toyota Frontlander

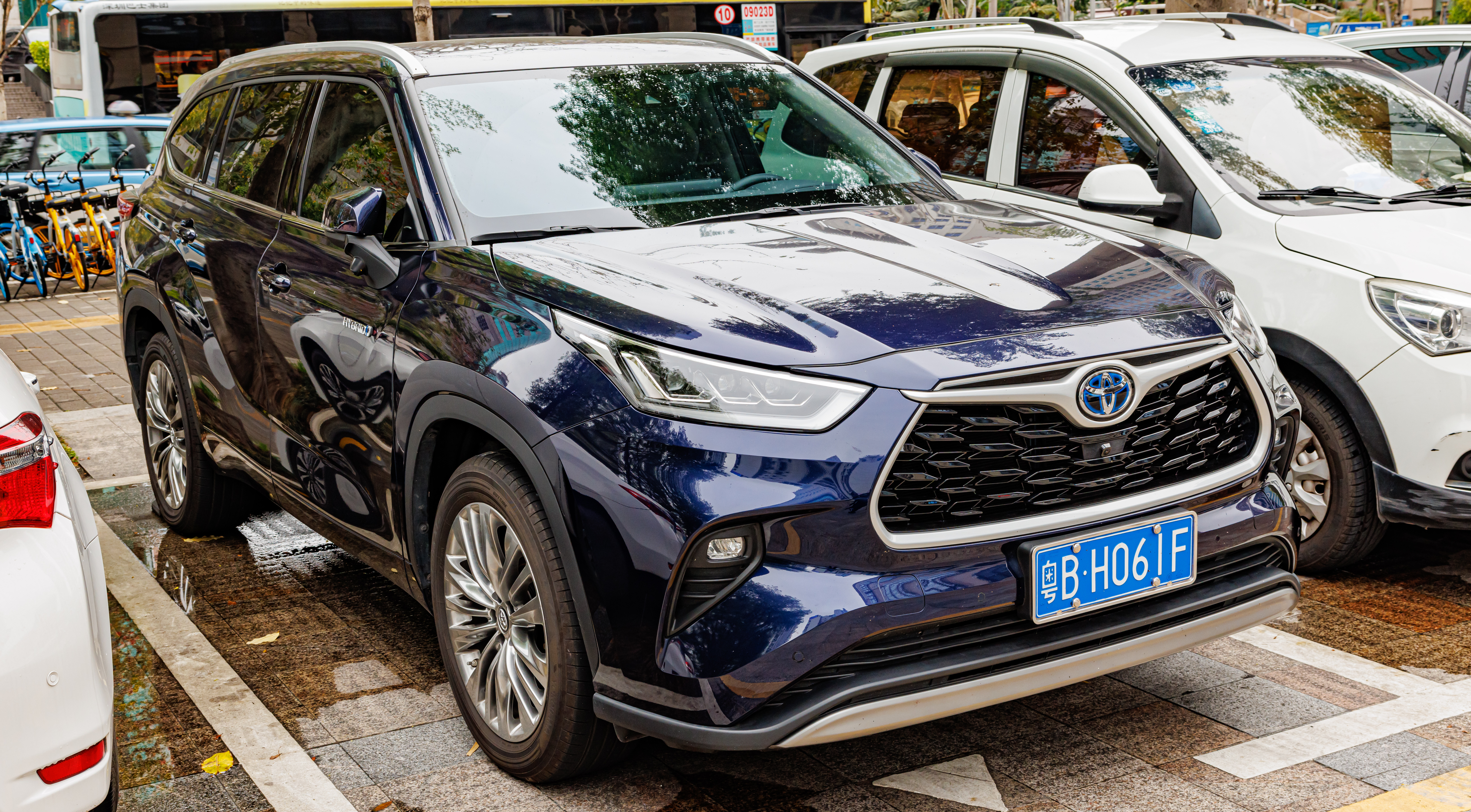
2020–present
丰田汉兰达XU70
Toyota Highlander XU70

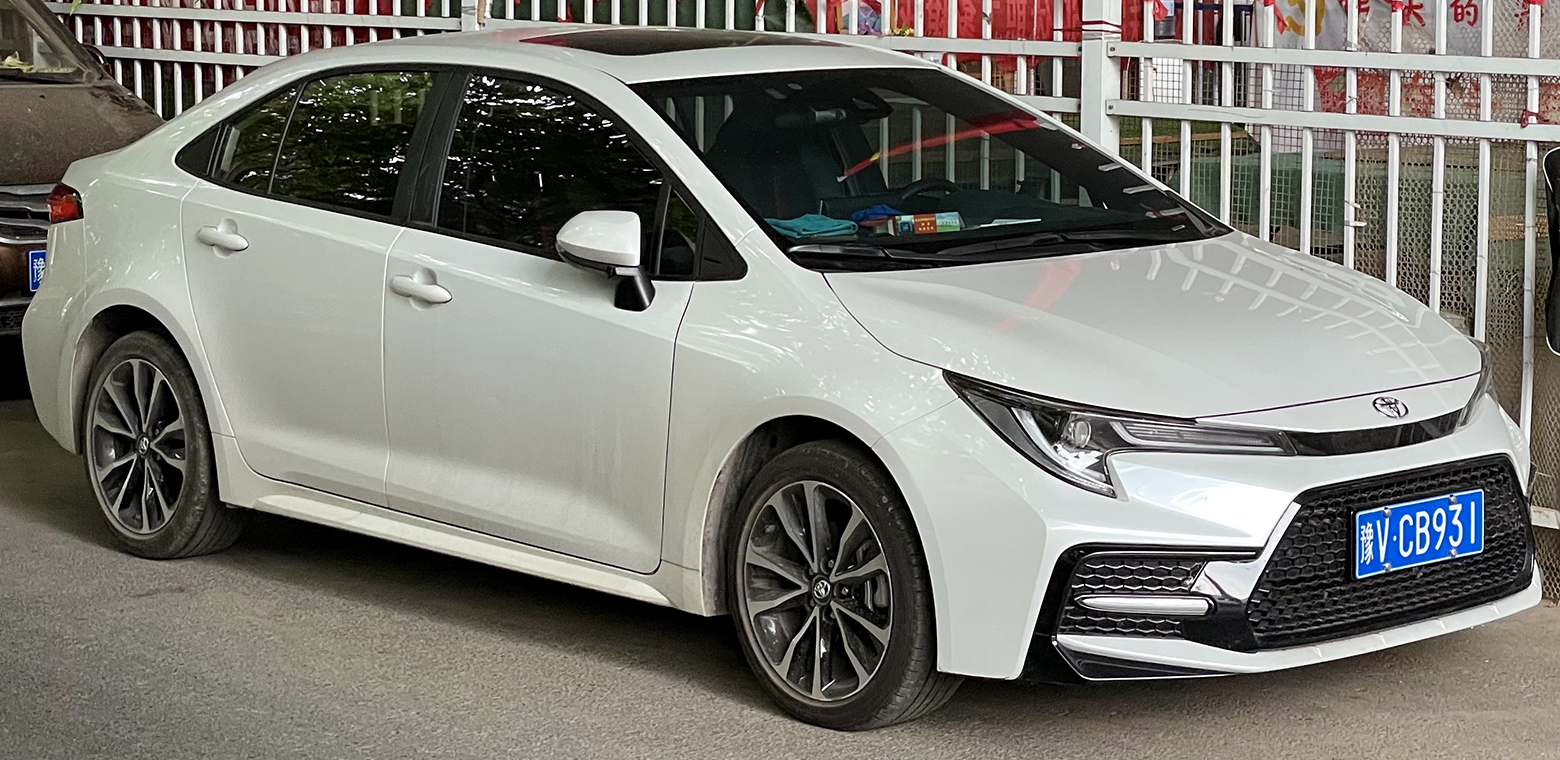
2019–present
丰田雷凌L E210
Toyota Levin L E210

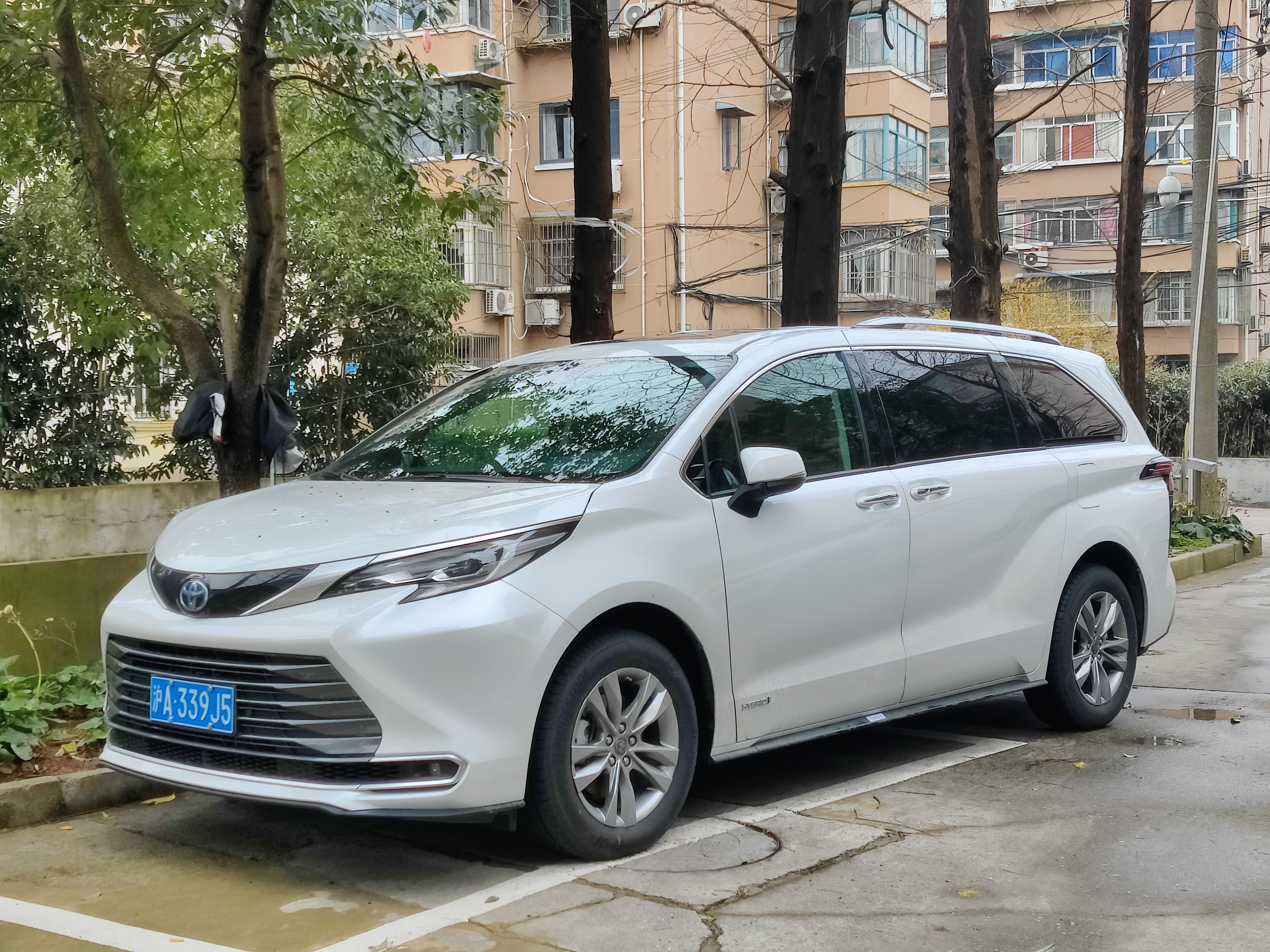
2021–present
丰田赛那XL40
Toyota Sienna XL40

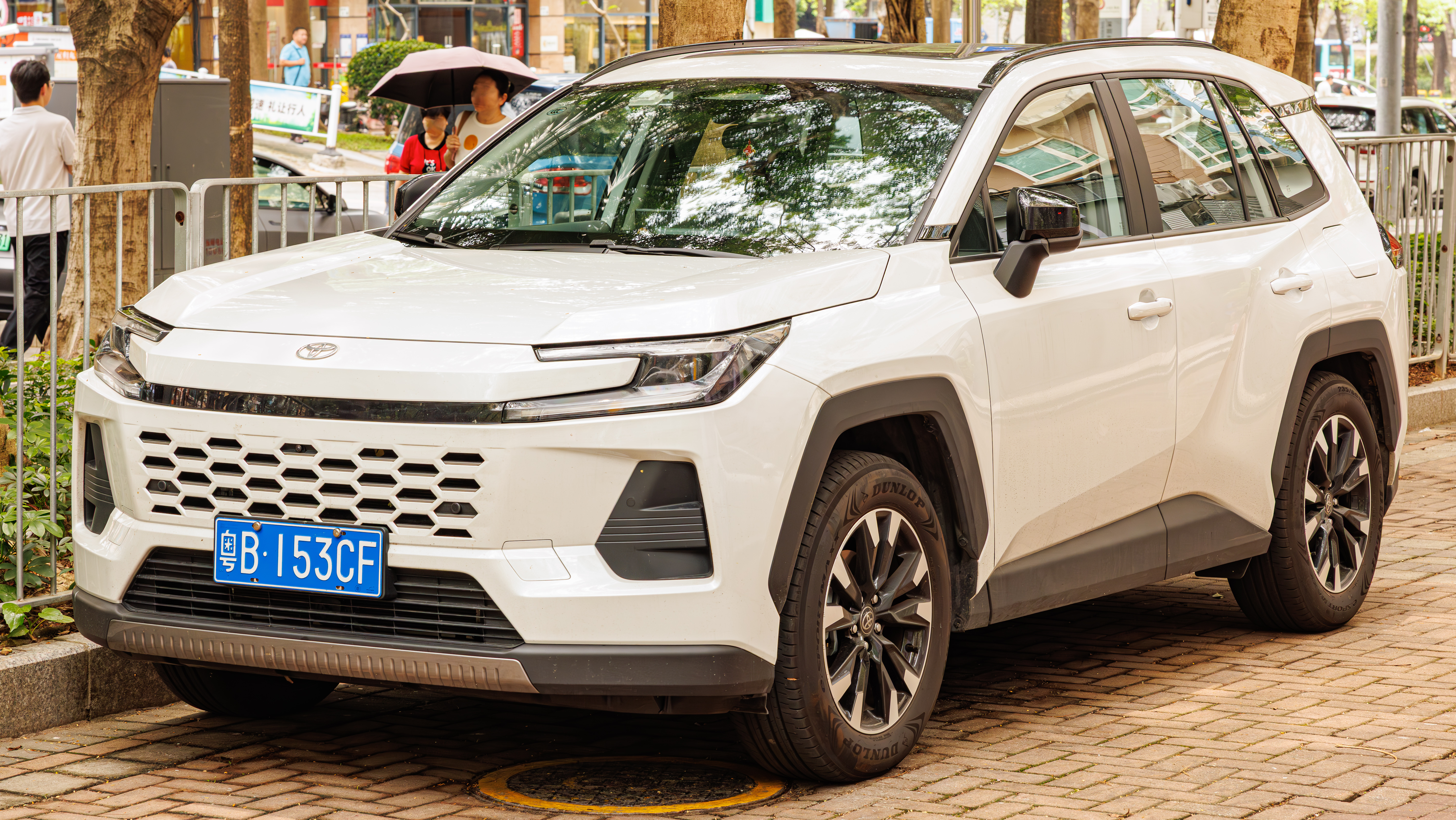
2025–present
丰田威兰达XA60
Toyota Wildlander XA60

=== Imported Vehicles ===
==== Toyota (Imported by FAW Toyota) ====
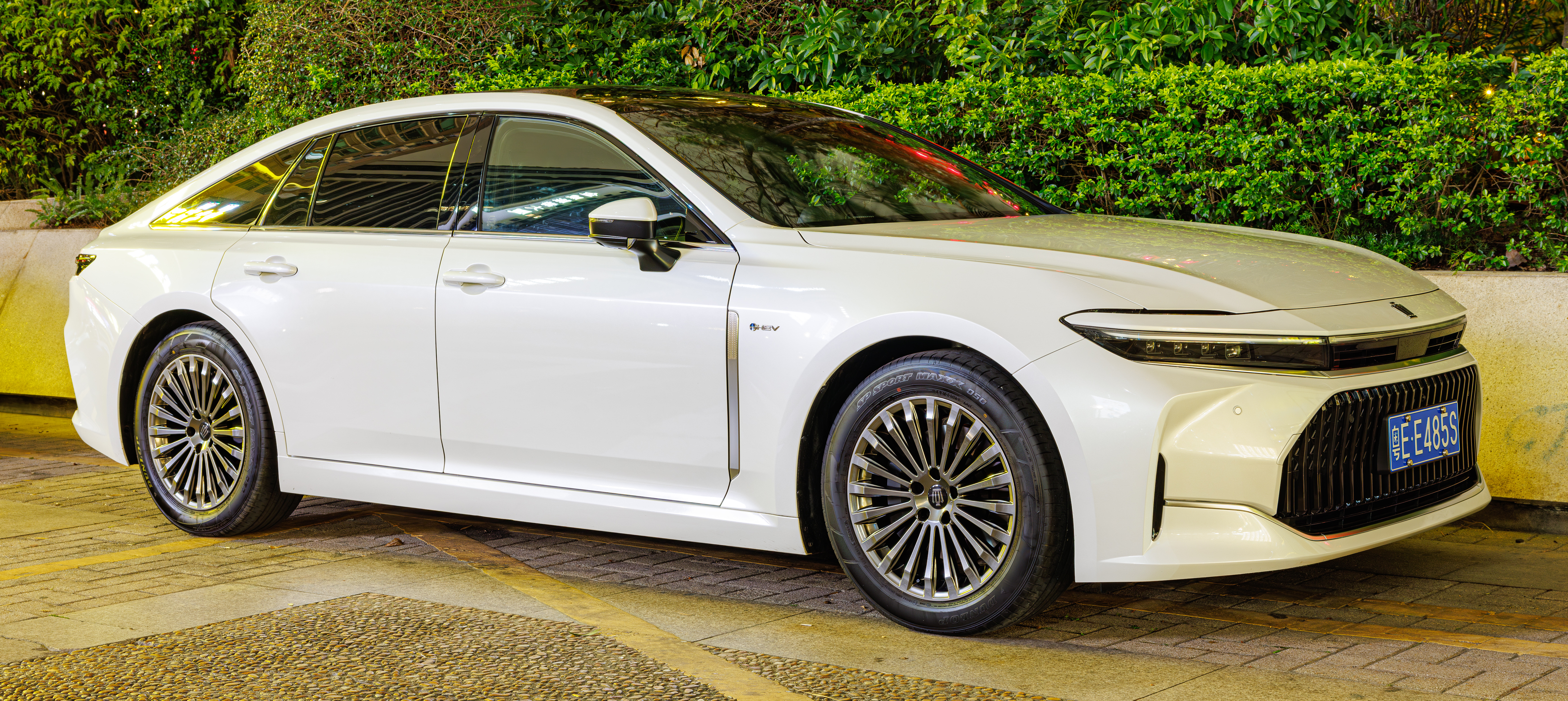
2023–present
丰田皇冠S230
Toyota Crown S230

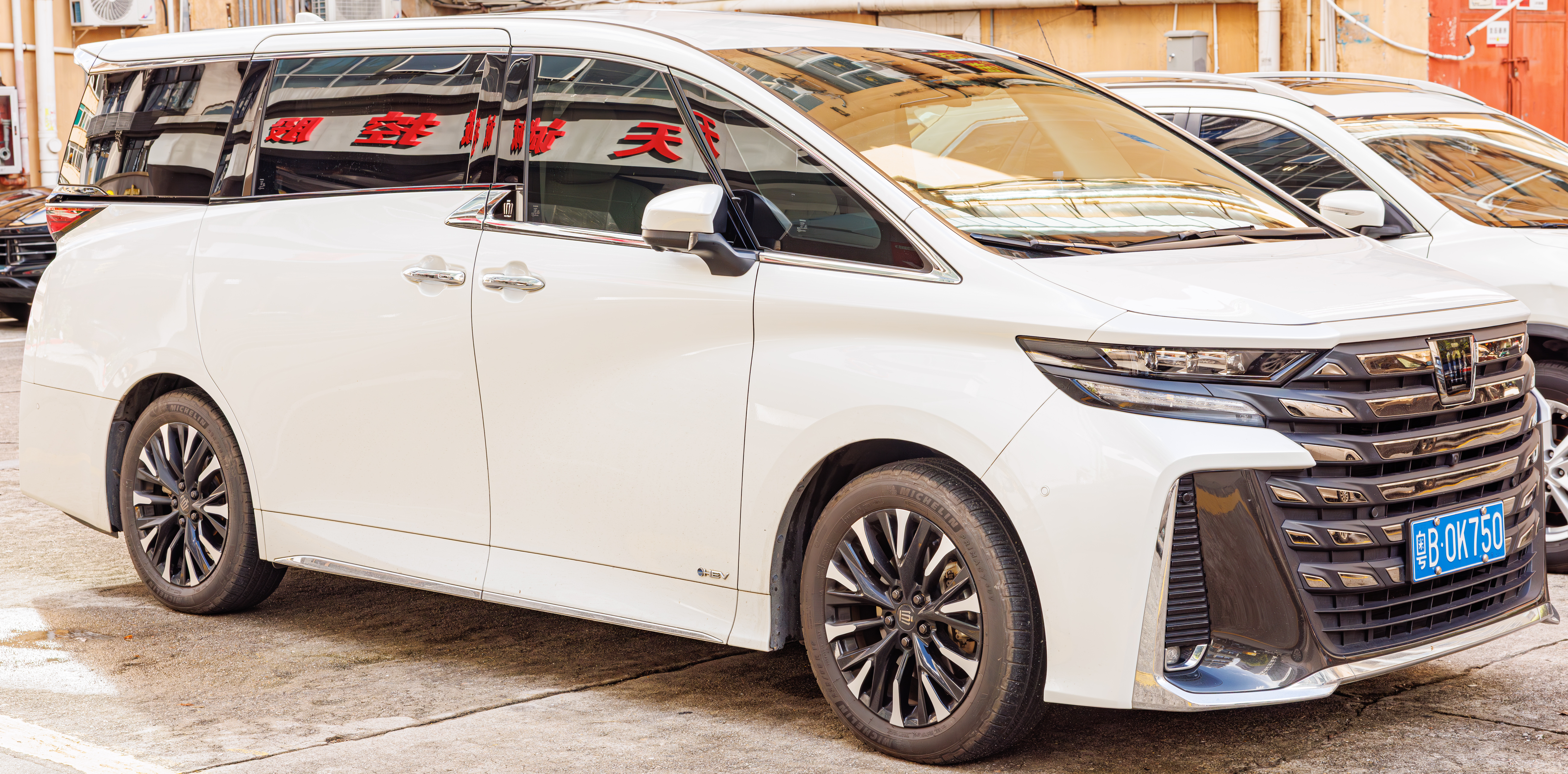
2023–present
丰田皇冠威尔法AH40
Toyota Crown Vellfire AH40

==== Toyota (Imported by GAC Toyota) ====
2023–present
丰田埃尔法AH40
Toyota Alphard AH40

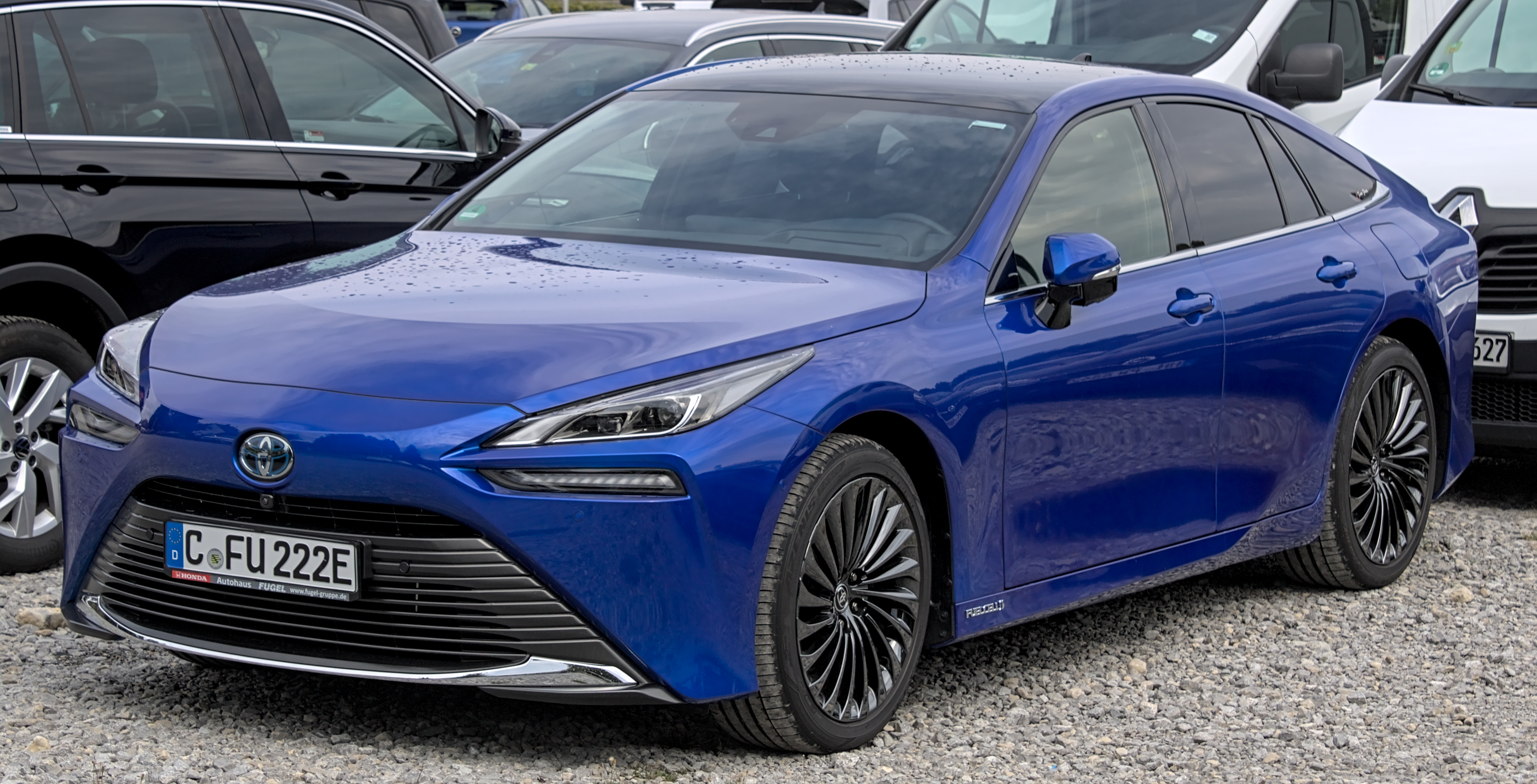
2023–present
丰田Miral JPD20
Toyota Mirai JPD20

==== Lexus ====
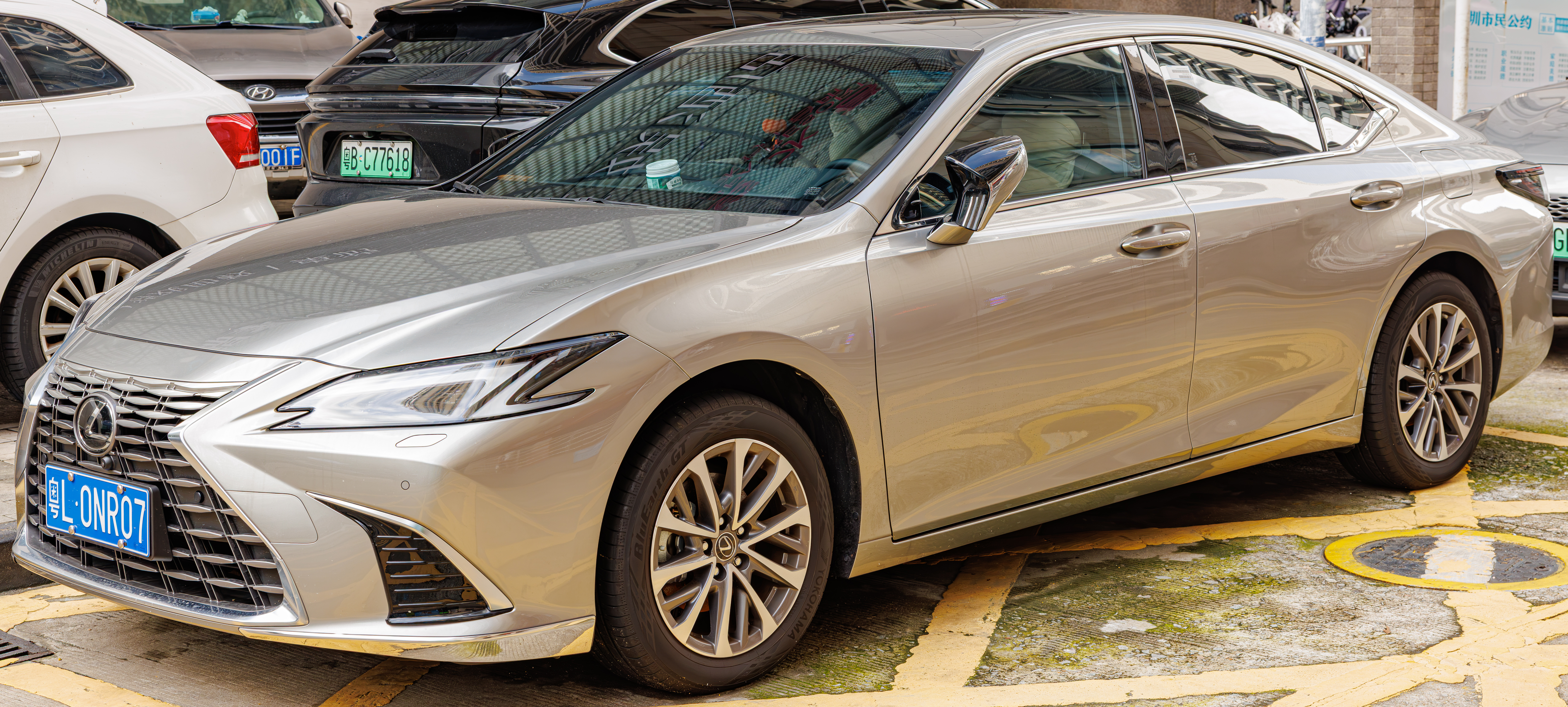
2018–present
雷克萨斯ES XZ10
Lexus ES XZ10

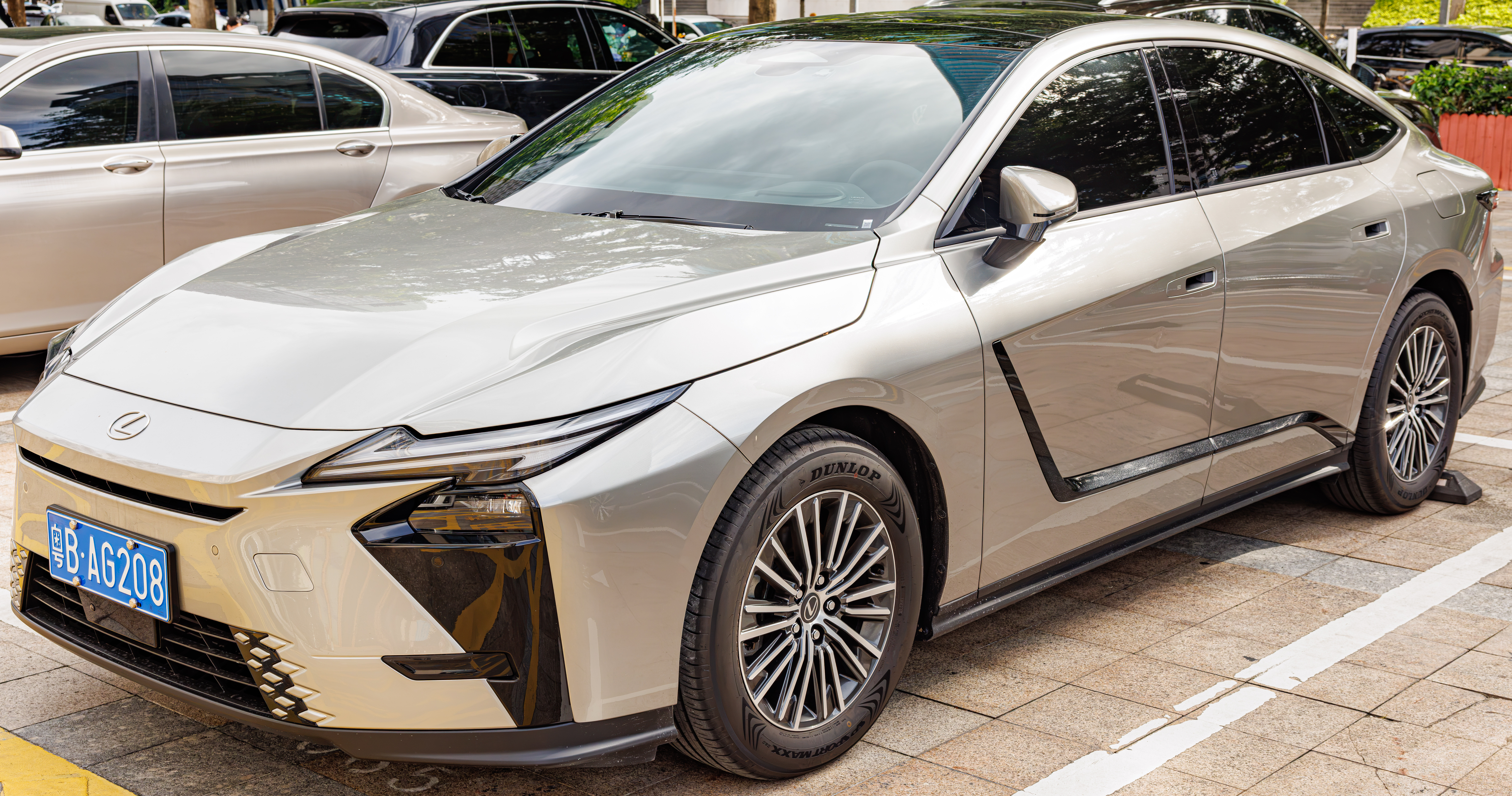
2026–present
雷克萨斯ES XZ20
Lexus ES XZ20

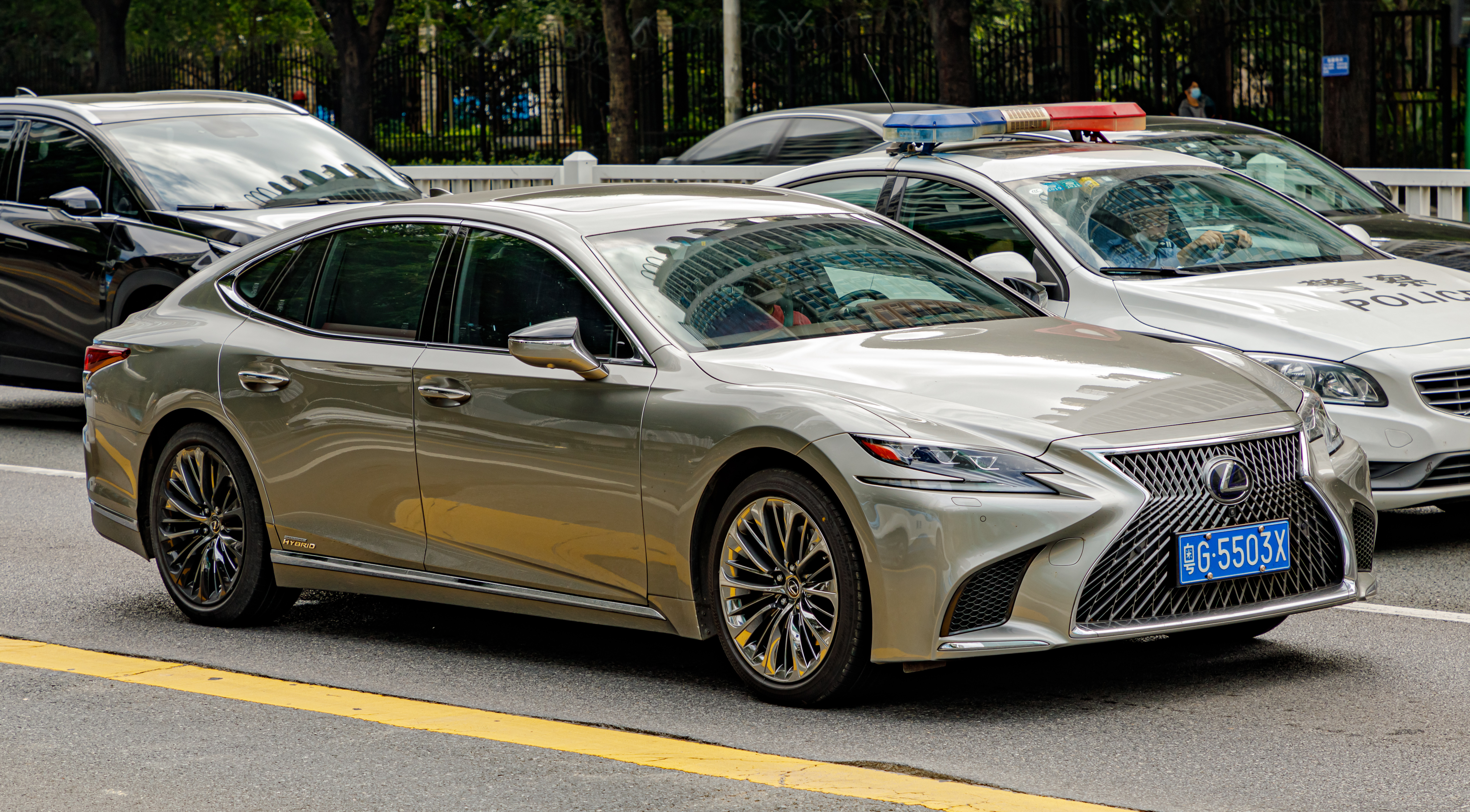
2018–present
雷克萨斯LS XF50
Lexus LS XF50

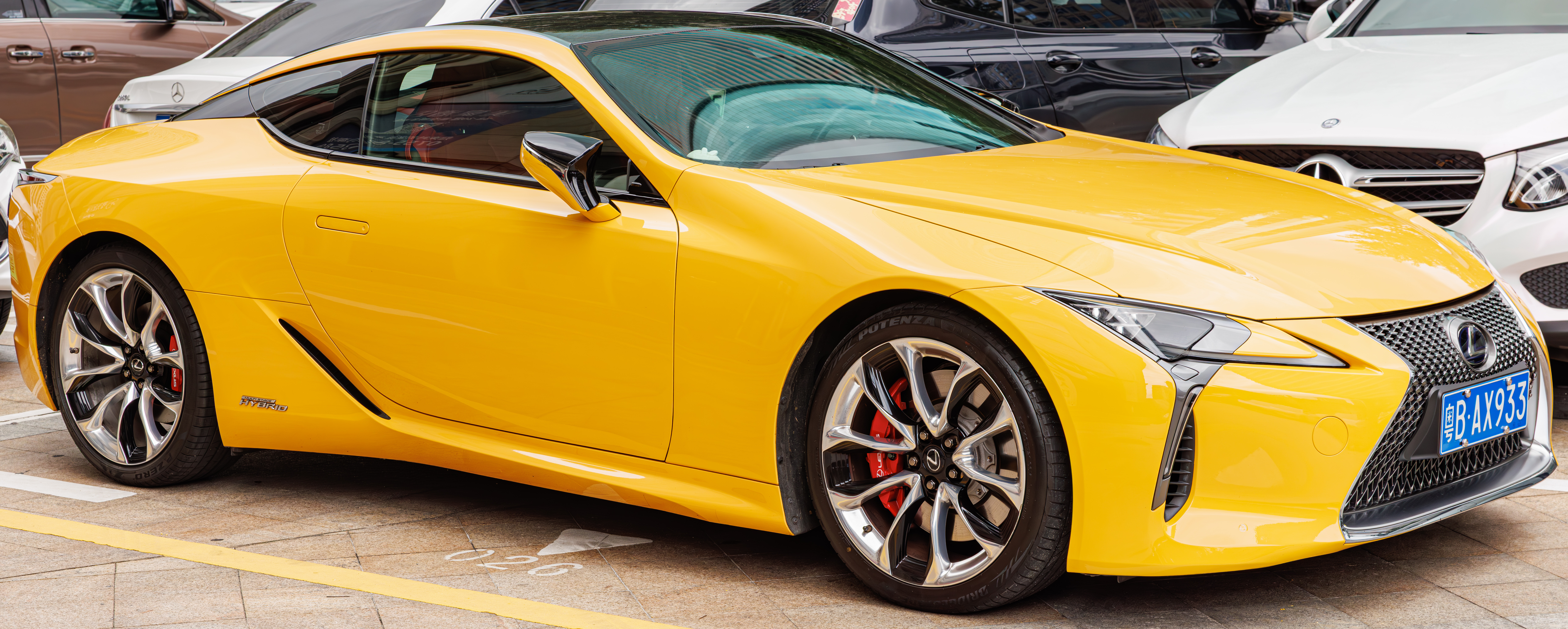
2018–present
雷克萨斯LC
Lexus LC

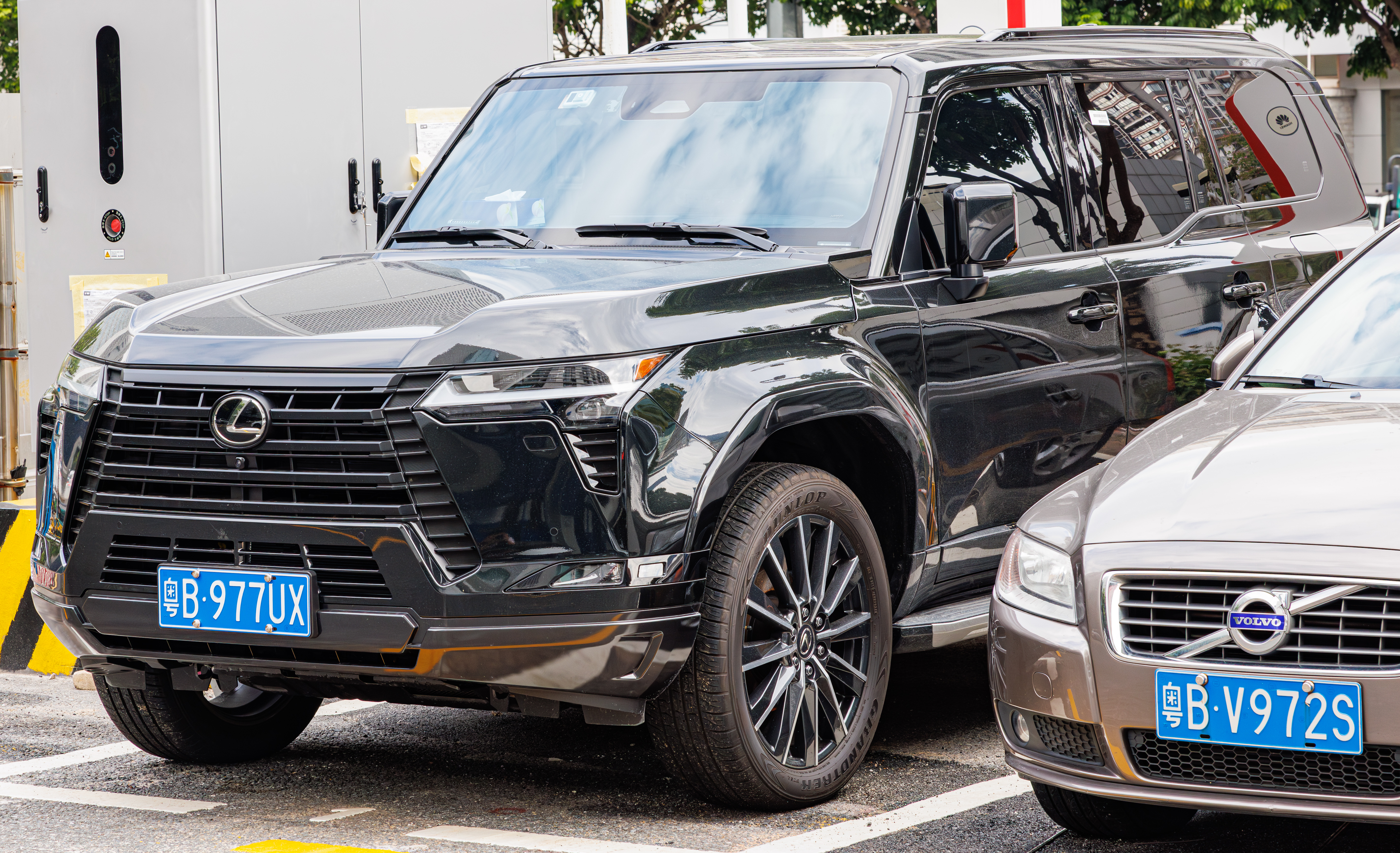
2024–present
雷克萨斯GX J250
Lexus GX J250

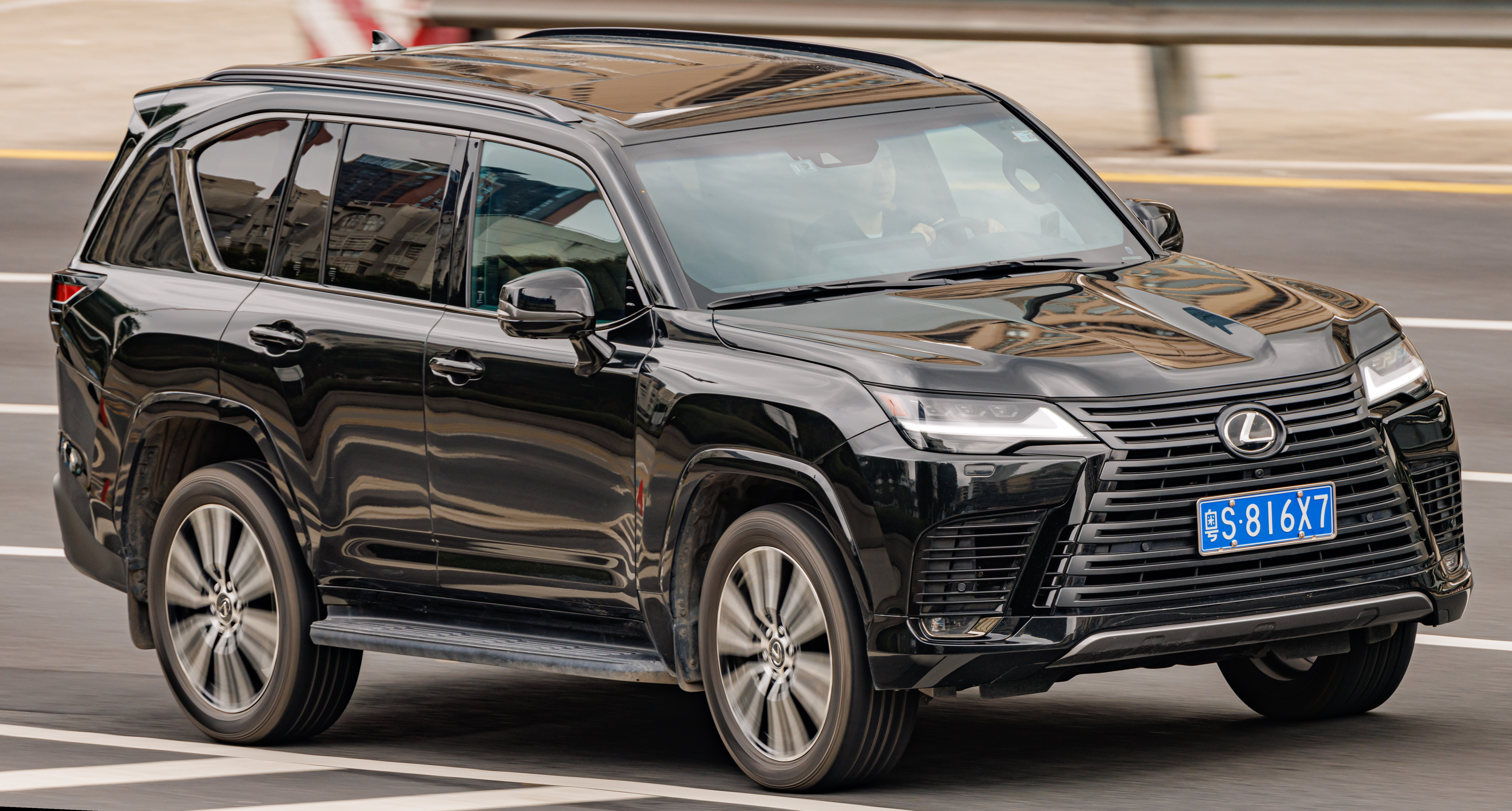
2024–present
雷克萨斯LX J310
Lexus LX J310

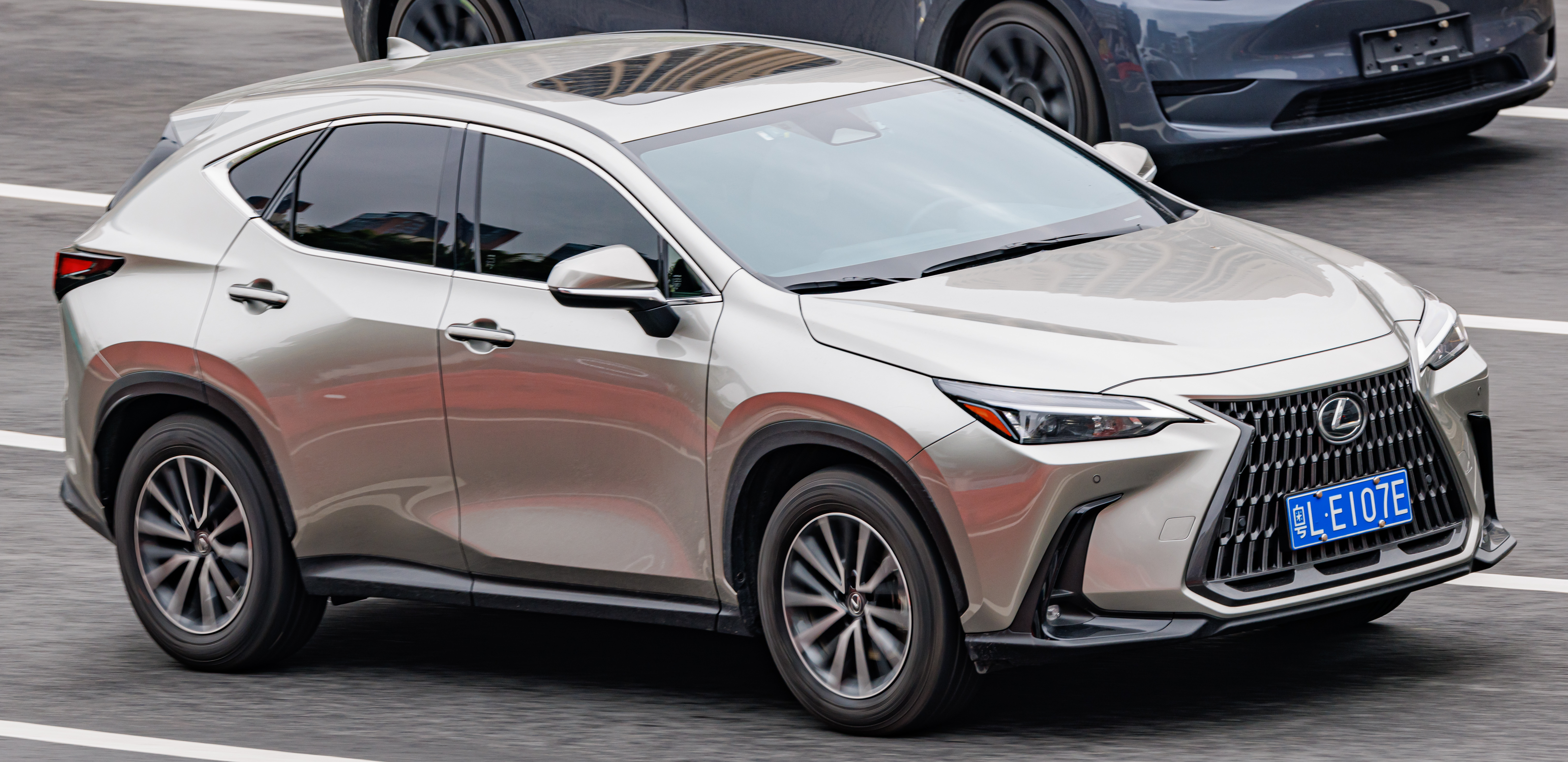
2021–present
雷克萨斯NX AZ20
Lexus NX AZ20

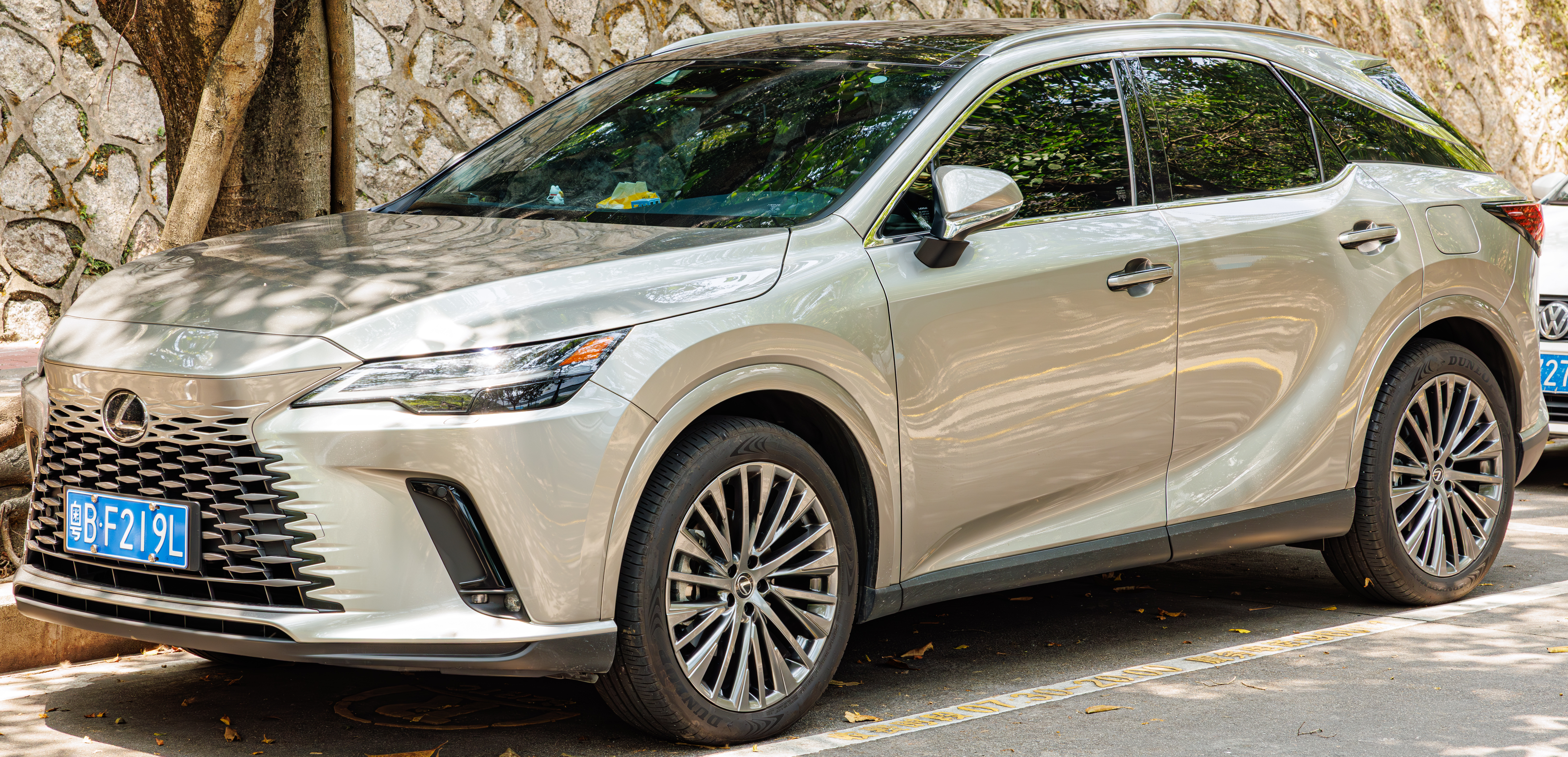
2023–present
雷克萨斯RX ALA10
Lexus RX ALA10

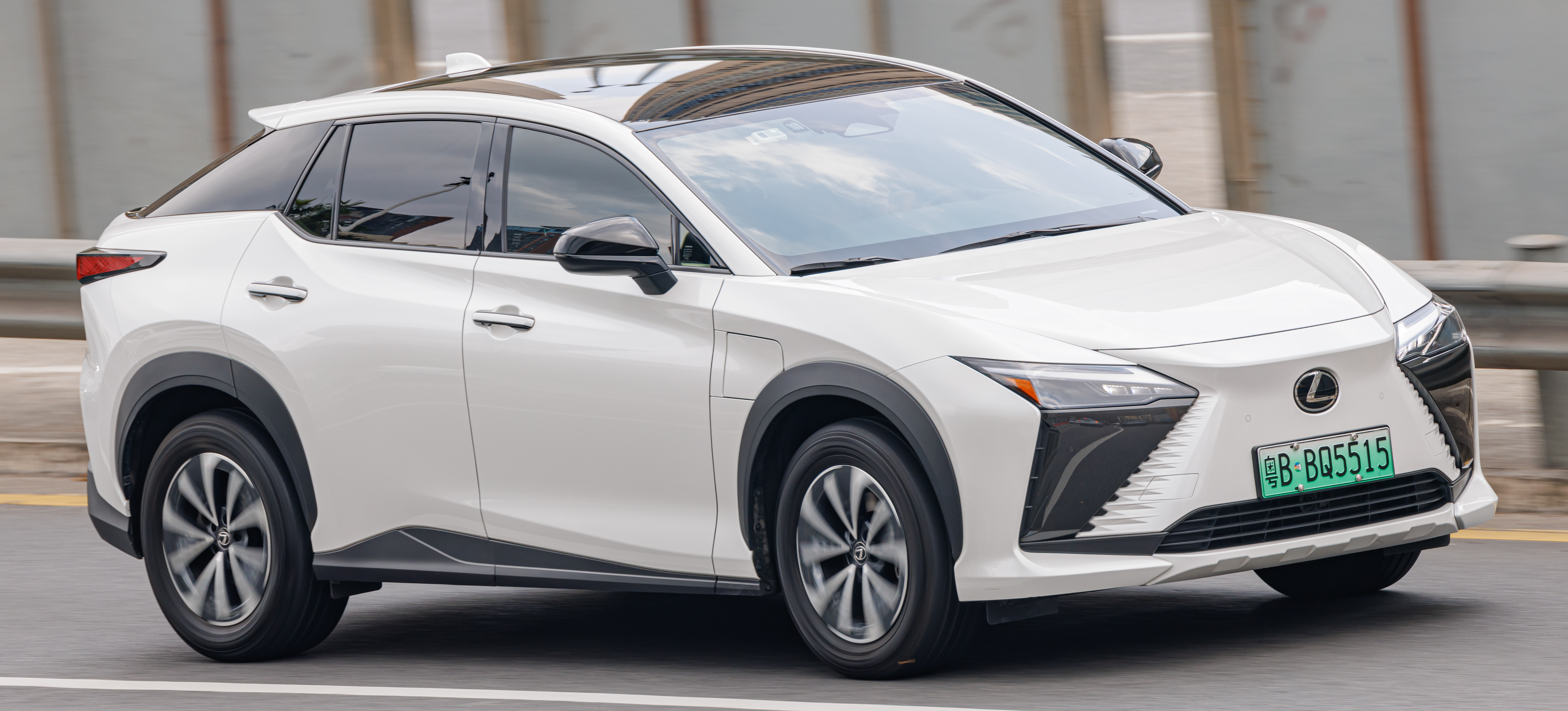
2023–present
雷克萨斯RZ
Lexus RZ

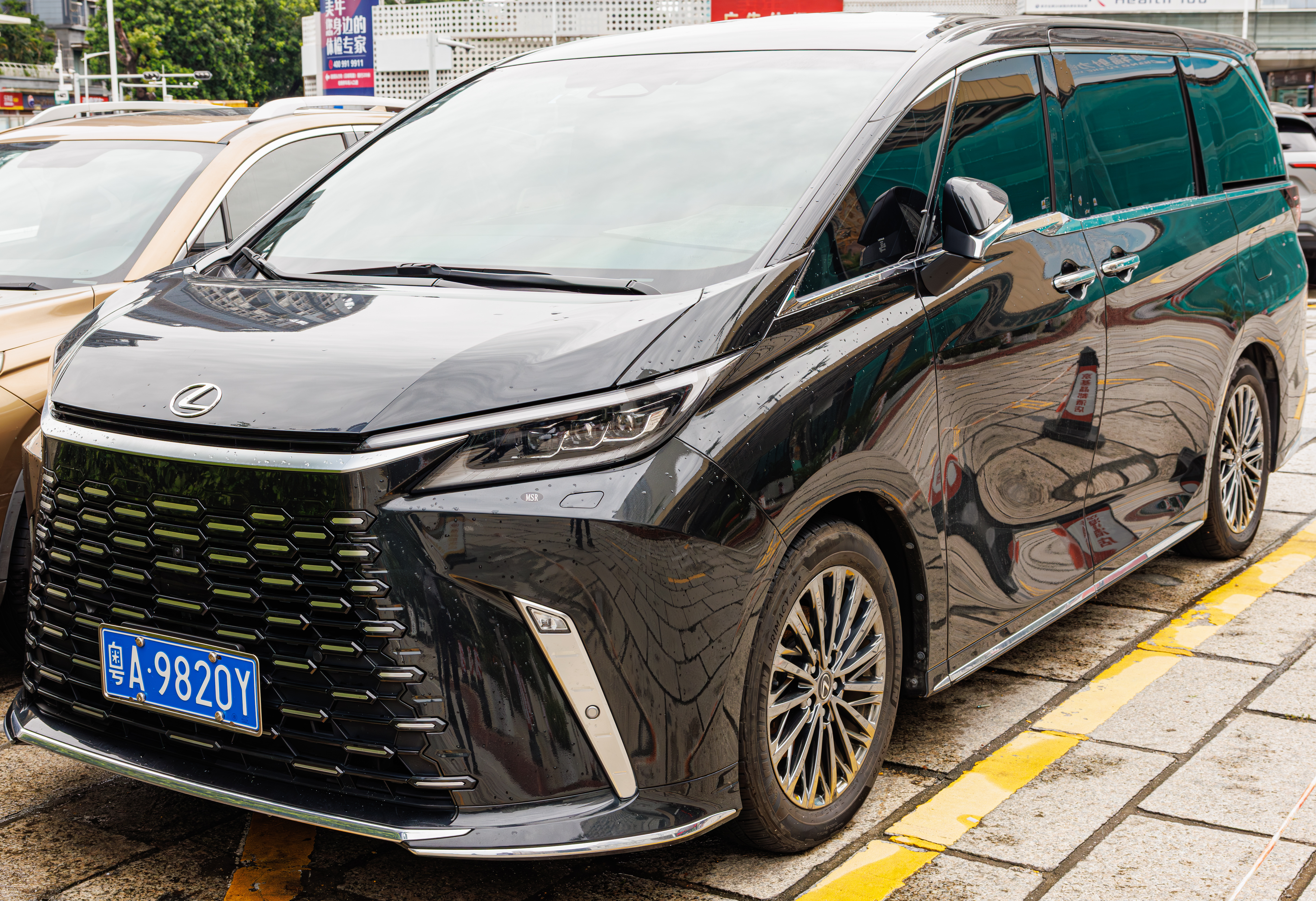
2023–present
雷克萨斯LM AW10
Lexus LM AW10

==== Shiji (Century) ====
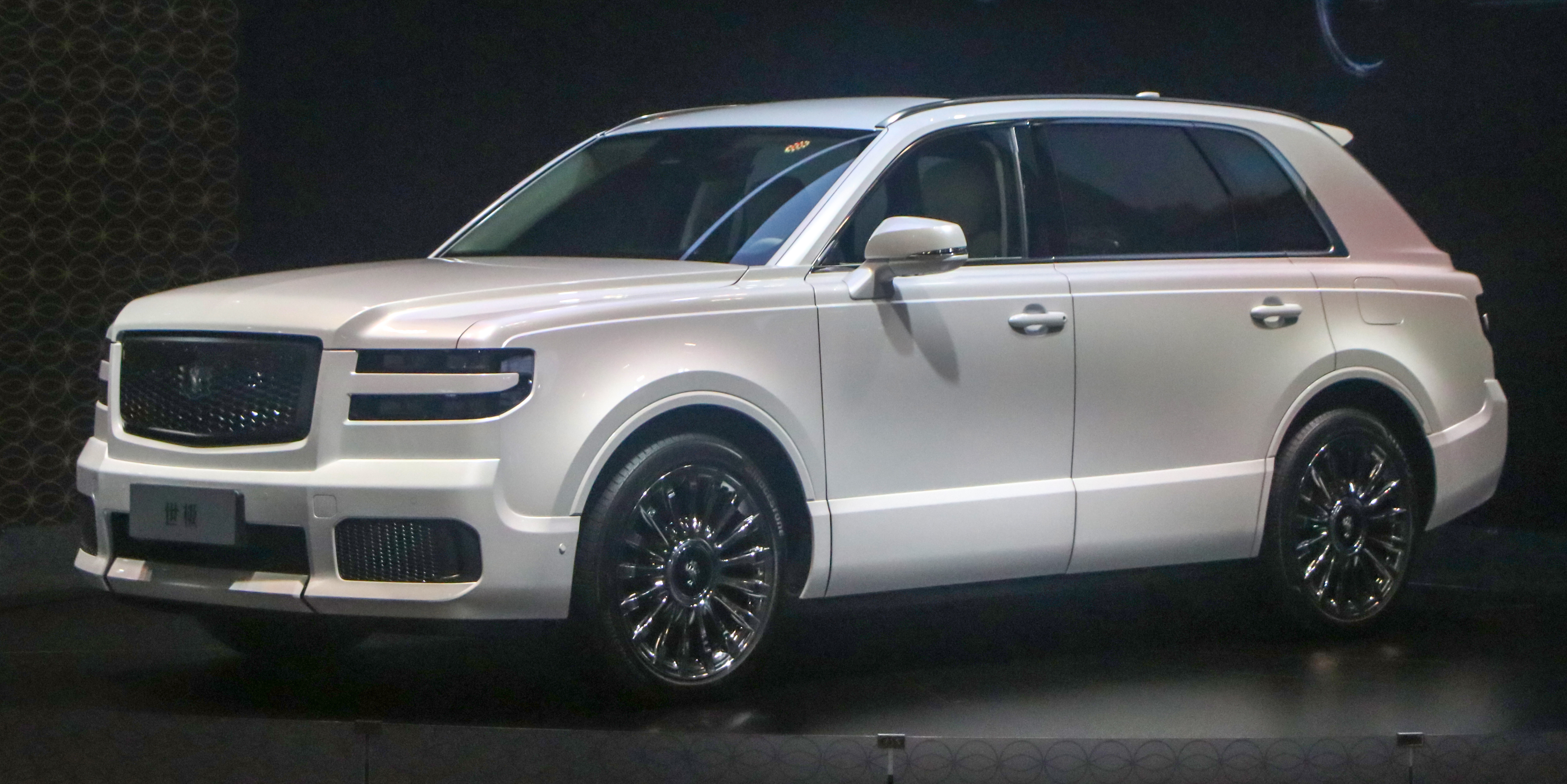
2023–present
世极
Shiji (Century SUV)

==== Toyota Gazoo Racing (TGR) ====
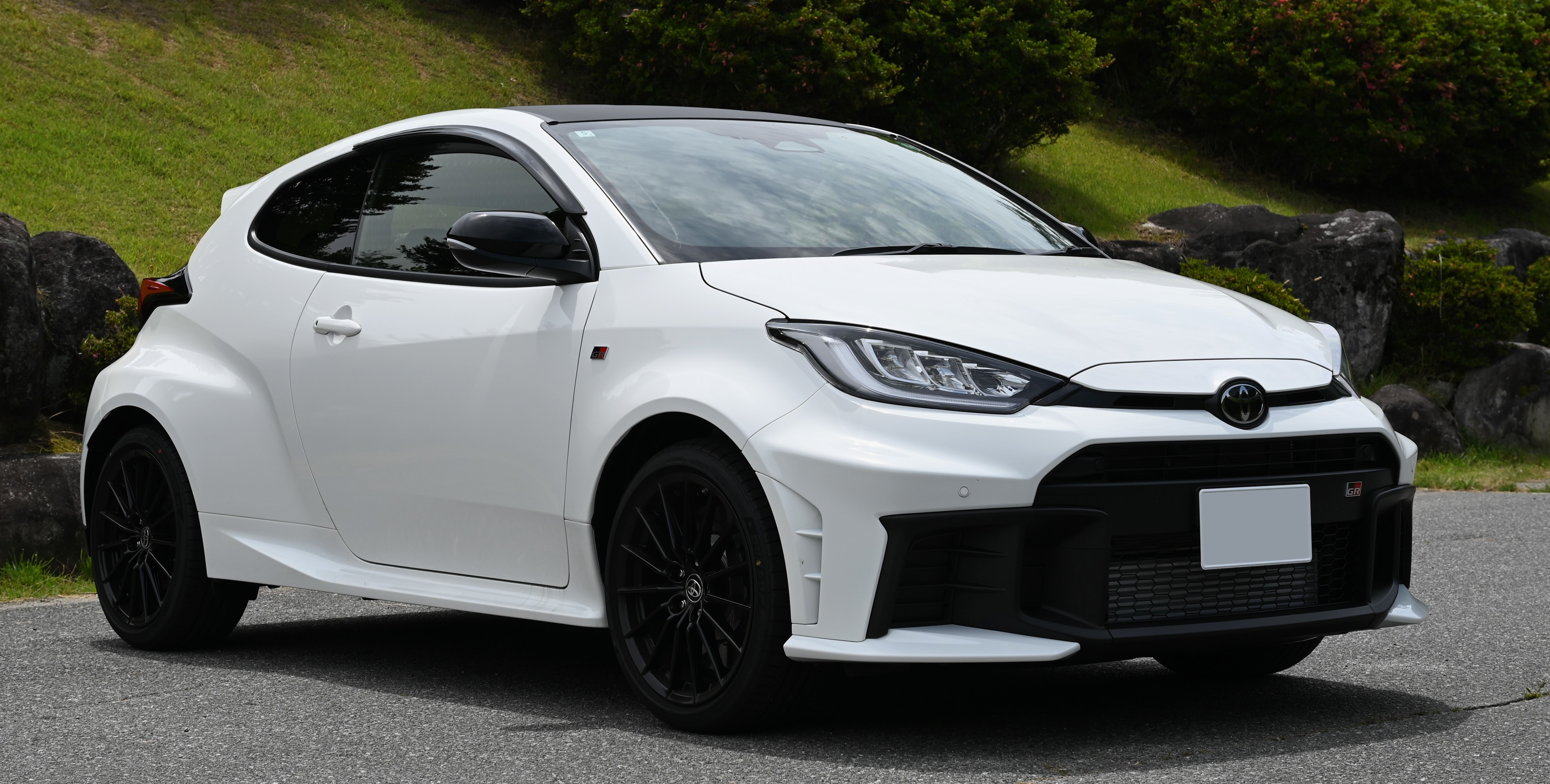
2024–present
丰田GR Yaris
Toyota GR Yaris

== Former Models ==
=== Manufactured locally Vehicles ===
==== FAW Toyota ====
===== TFTM (Tianjin Plant) =====
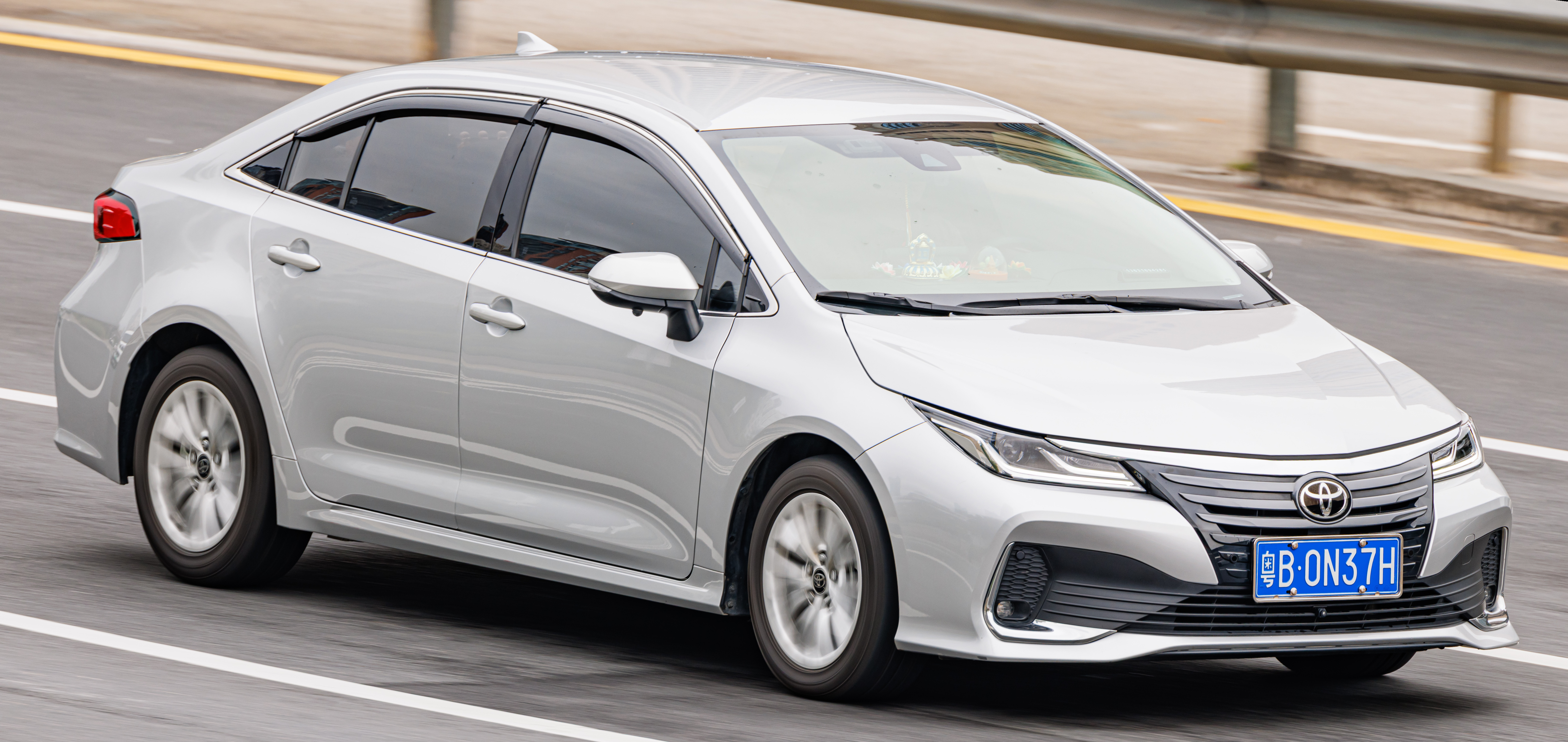
2020–2025
丰田亚洲狮E210
Toyota Allion E210

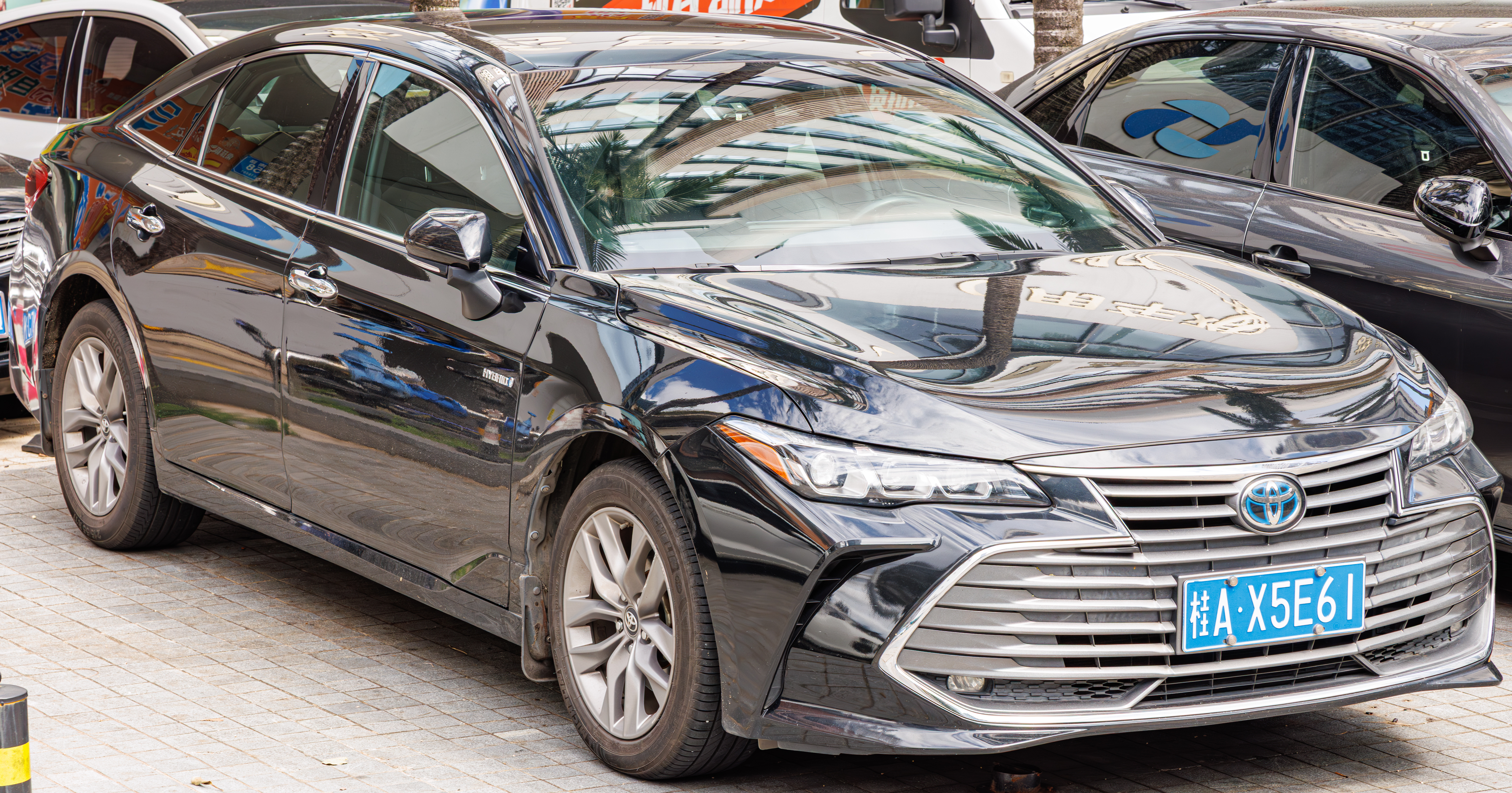
2019–2022
丰田亚洲龙XX50
Toyota Avalon XX50

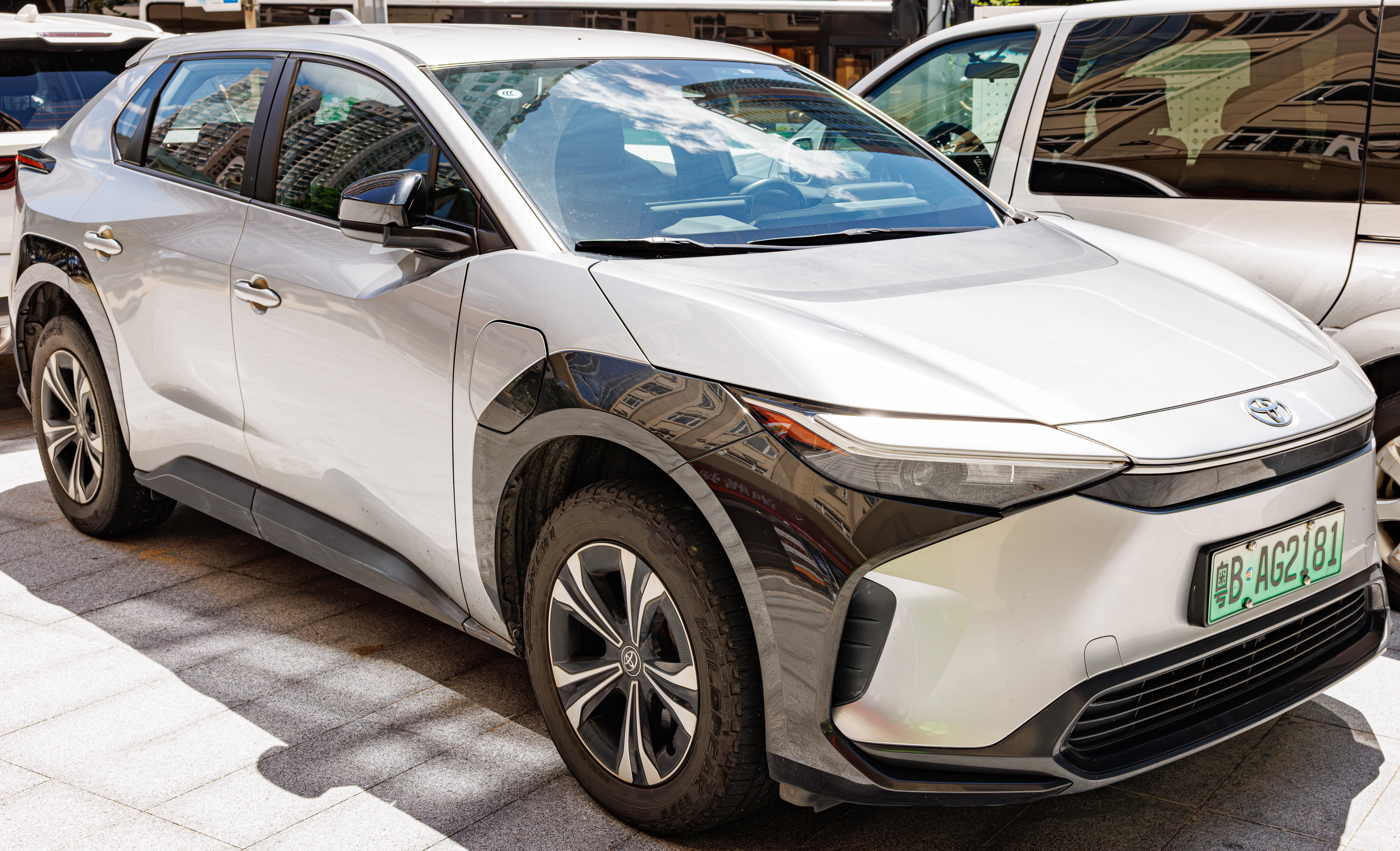
2022–2023
丰田bZ4X EA10
Toyota bZ4X (FAW Toyota) EA10

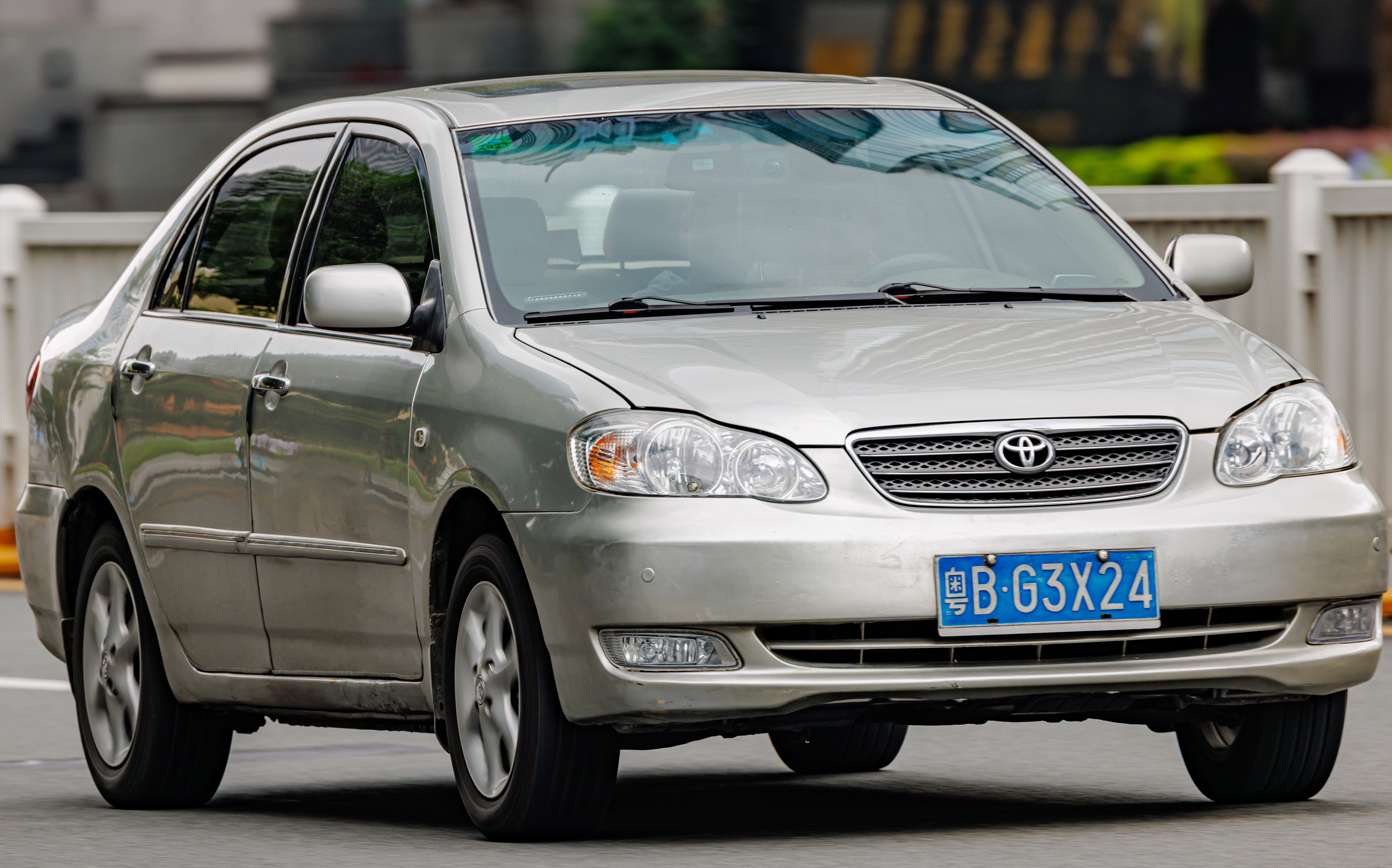
2004–2007
丰田花冠E120
Toyota Corolla E120

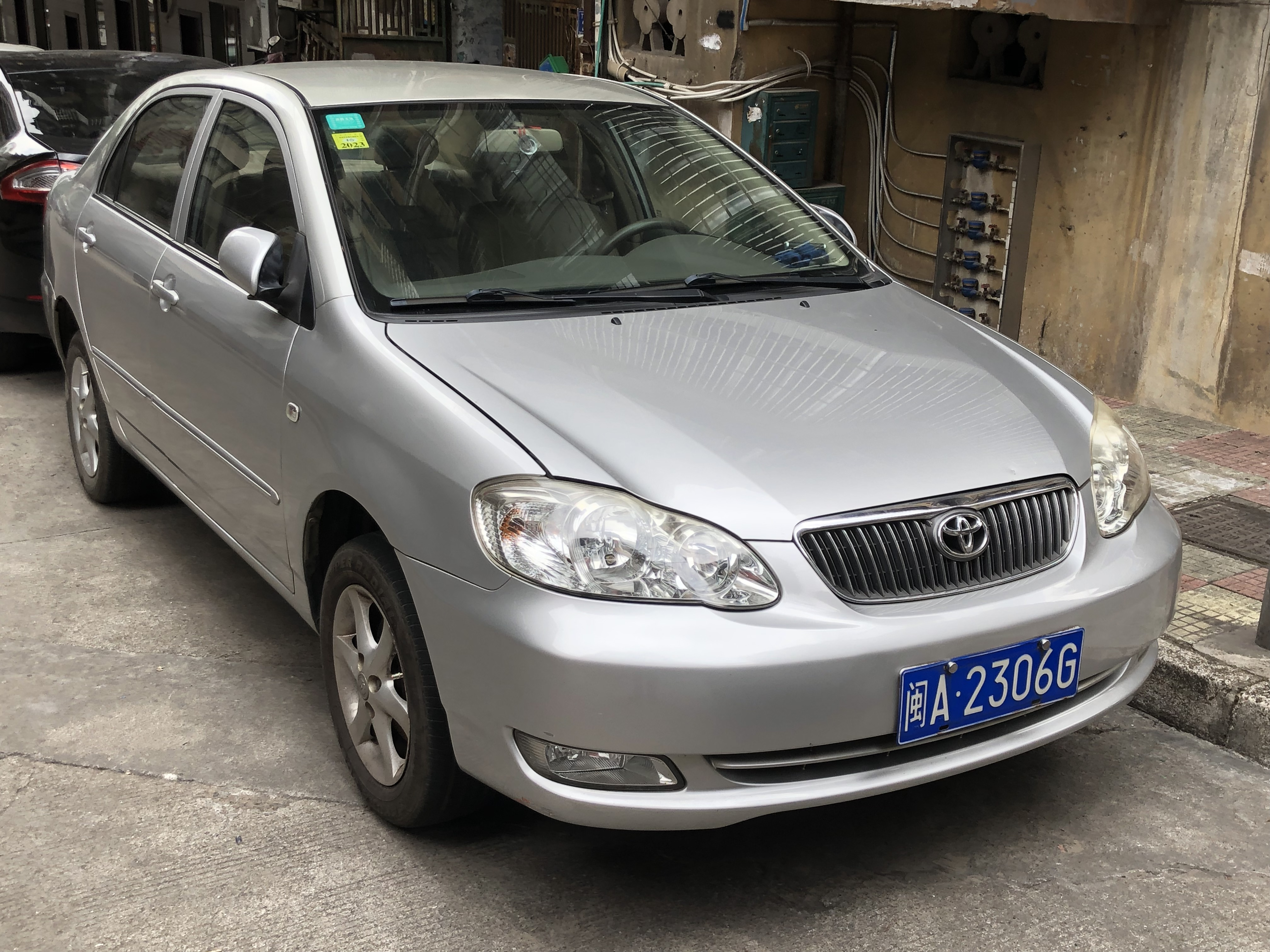
2007–2010
丰田花冠E120
Toyota Corolla EX E120

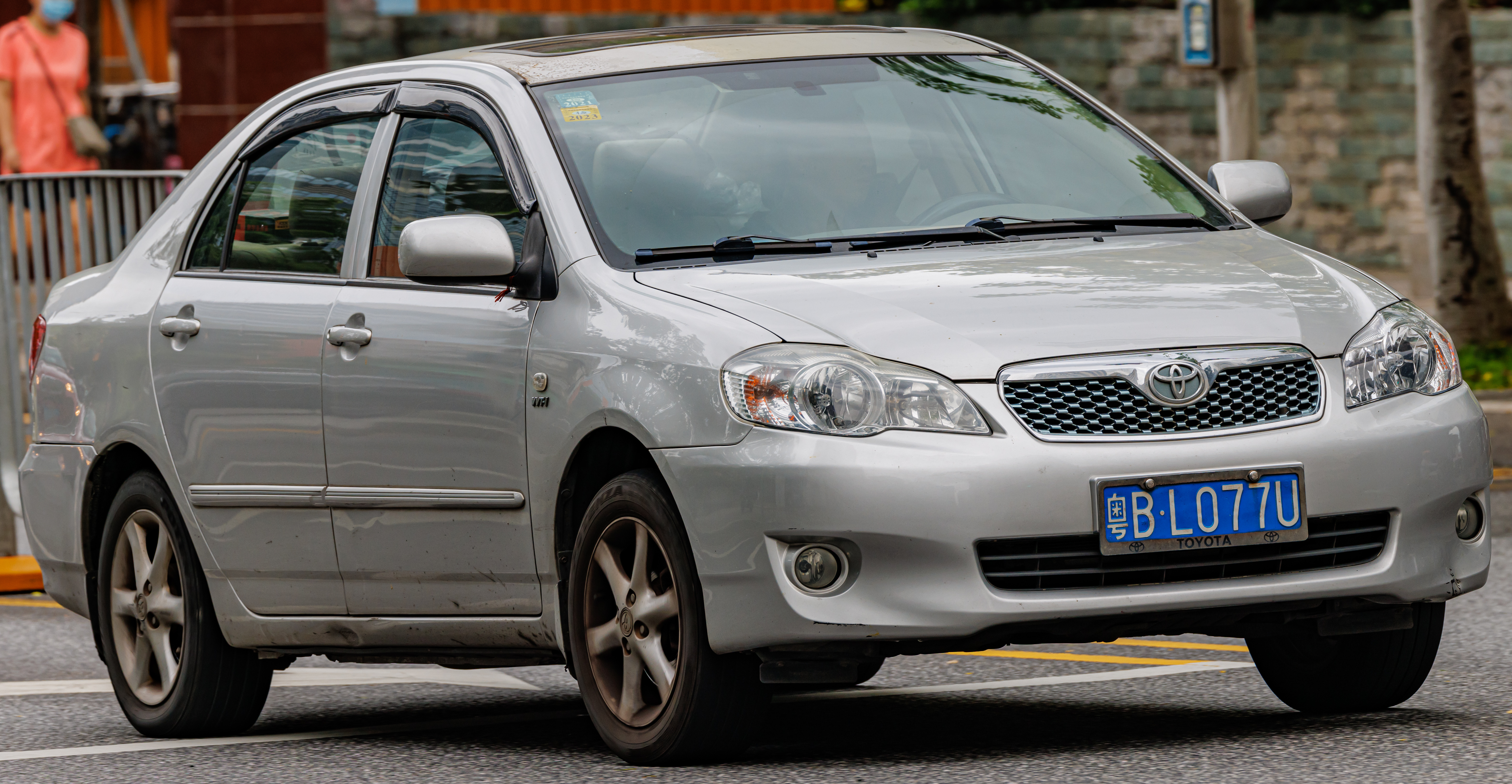
2010–2013
丰田花冠E120
Toyota Corolla EX E120

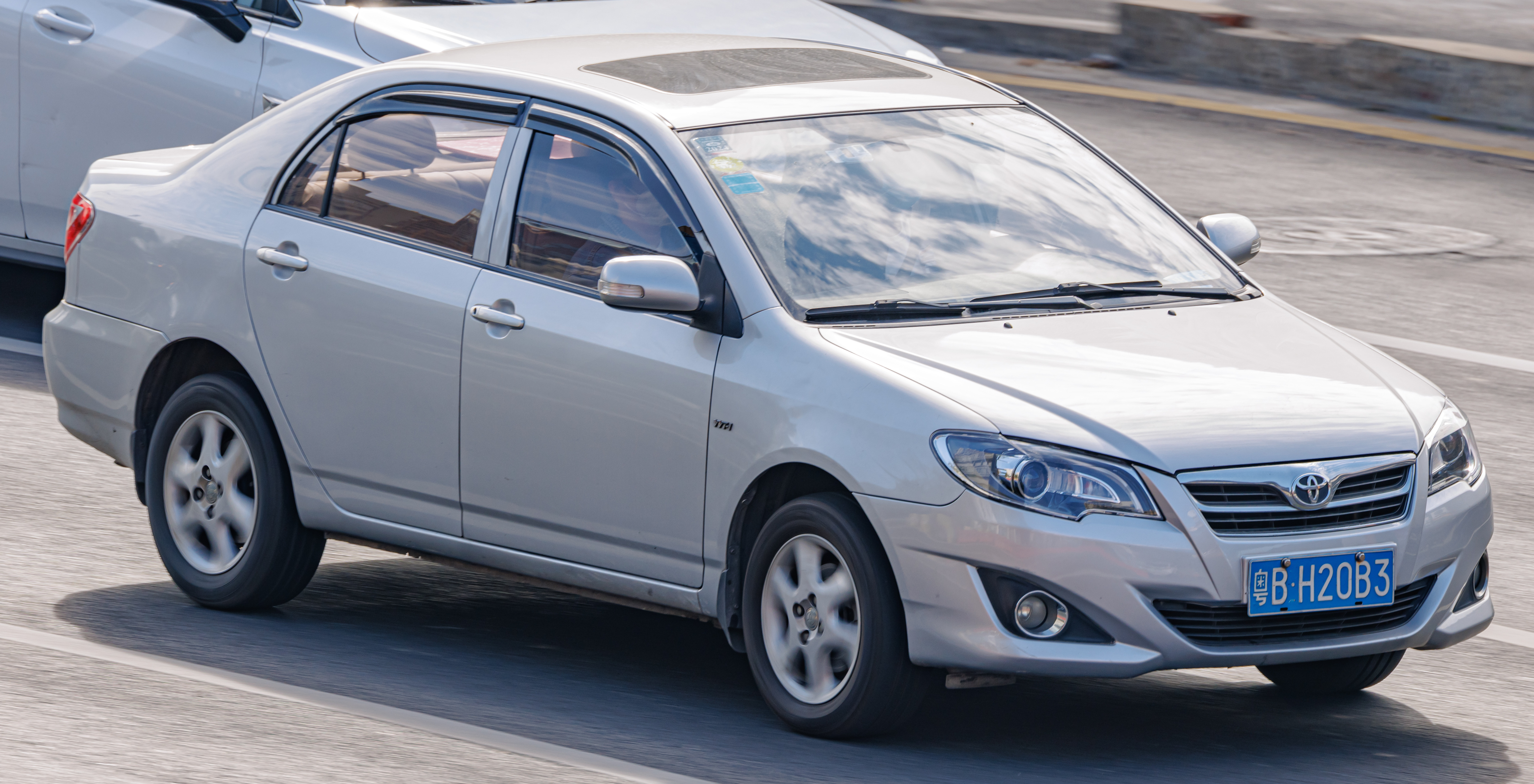
2013–2017
丰田花冠E120
Toyota Corolla EX E120

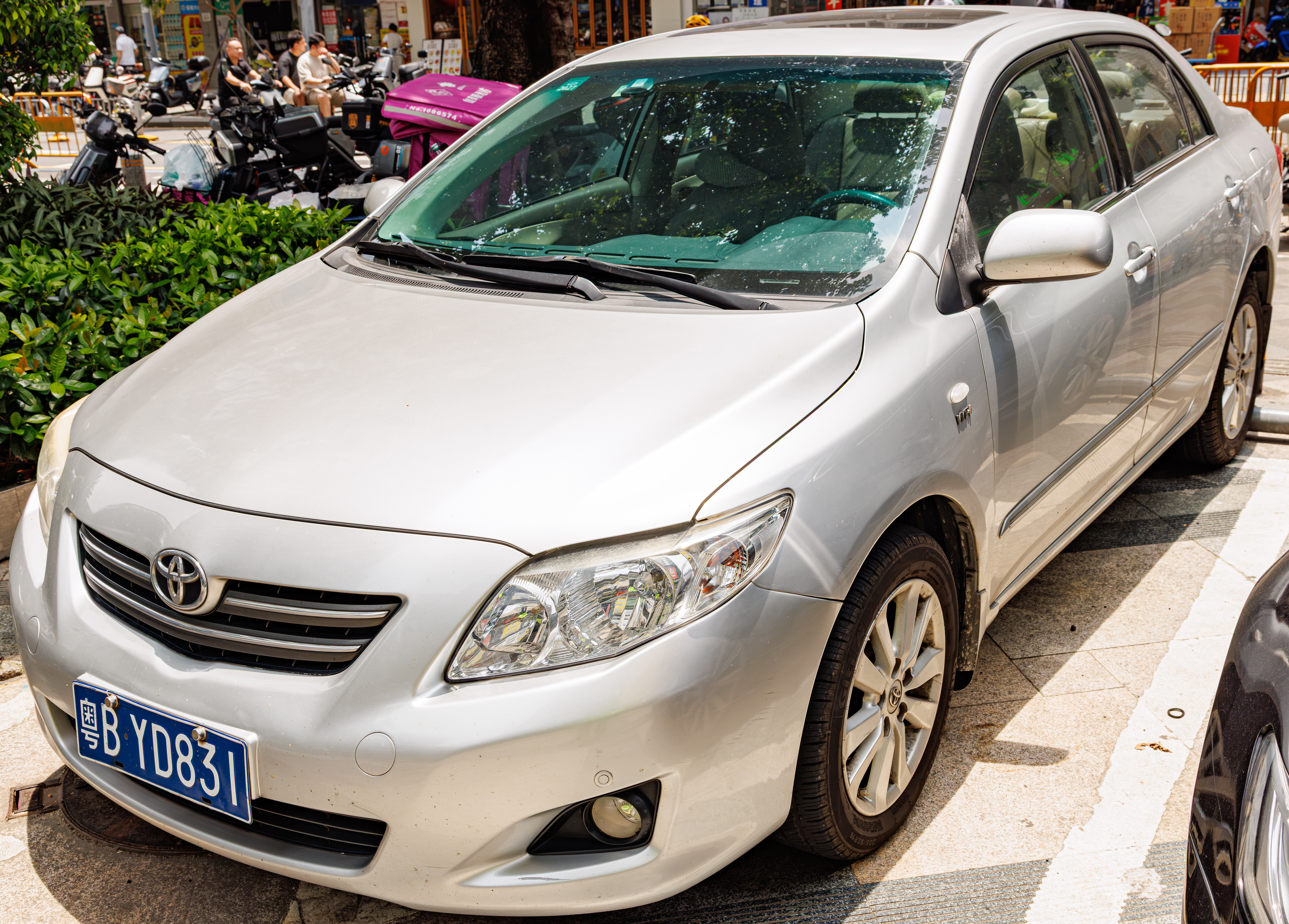
2007–2011
丰田卡罗拉E140
Toyota Corolla E140

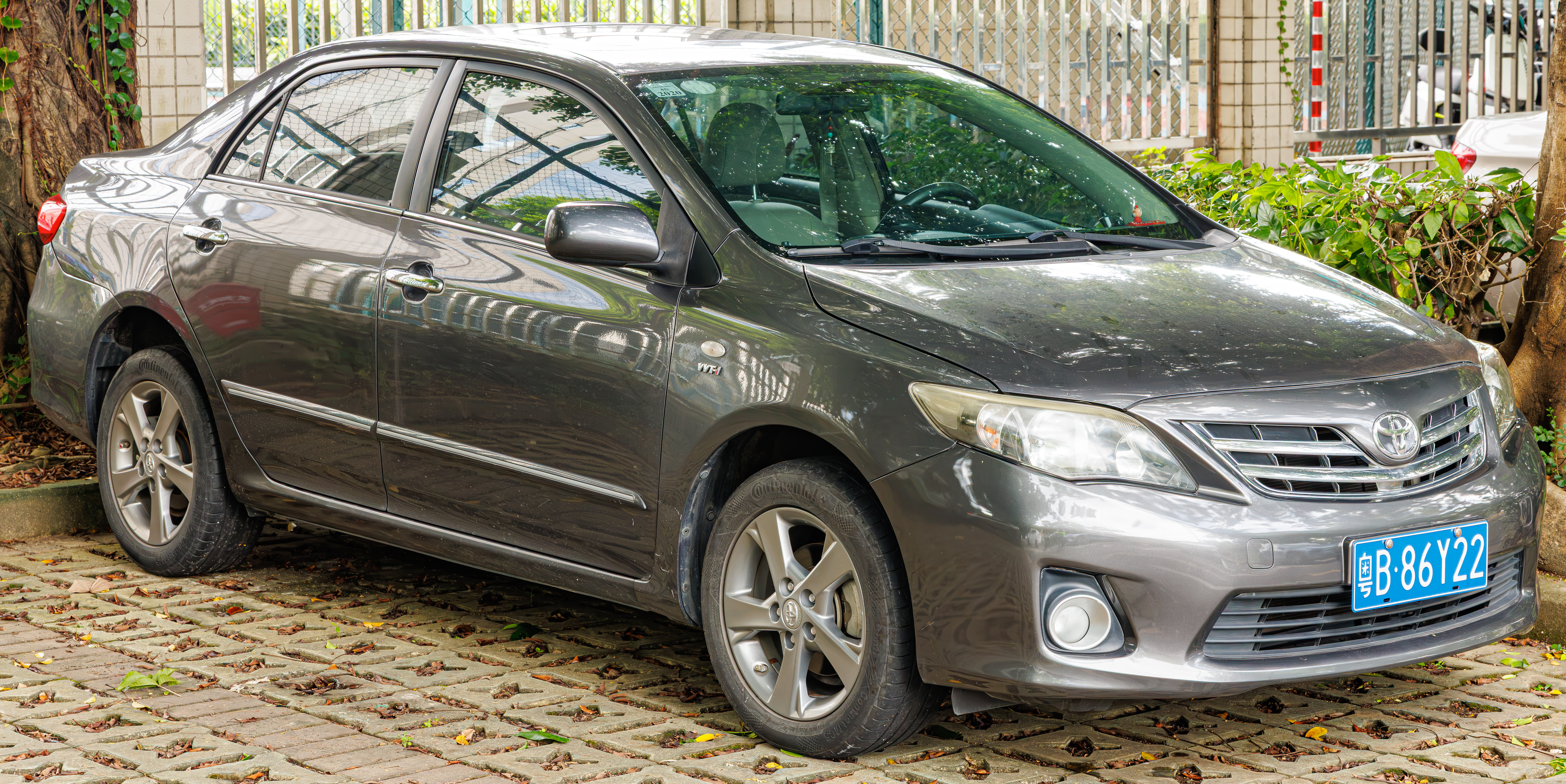
2011–2014
丰田卡罗拉E140
Toyota Corolla E140

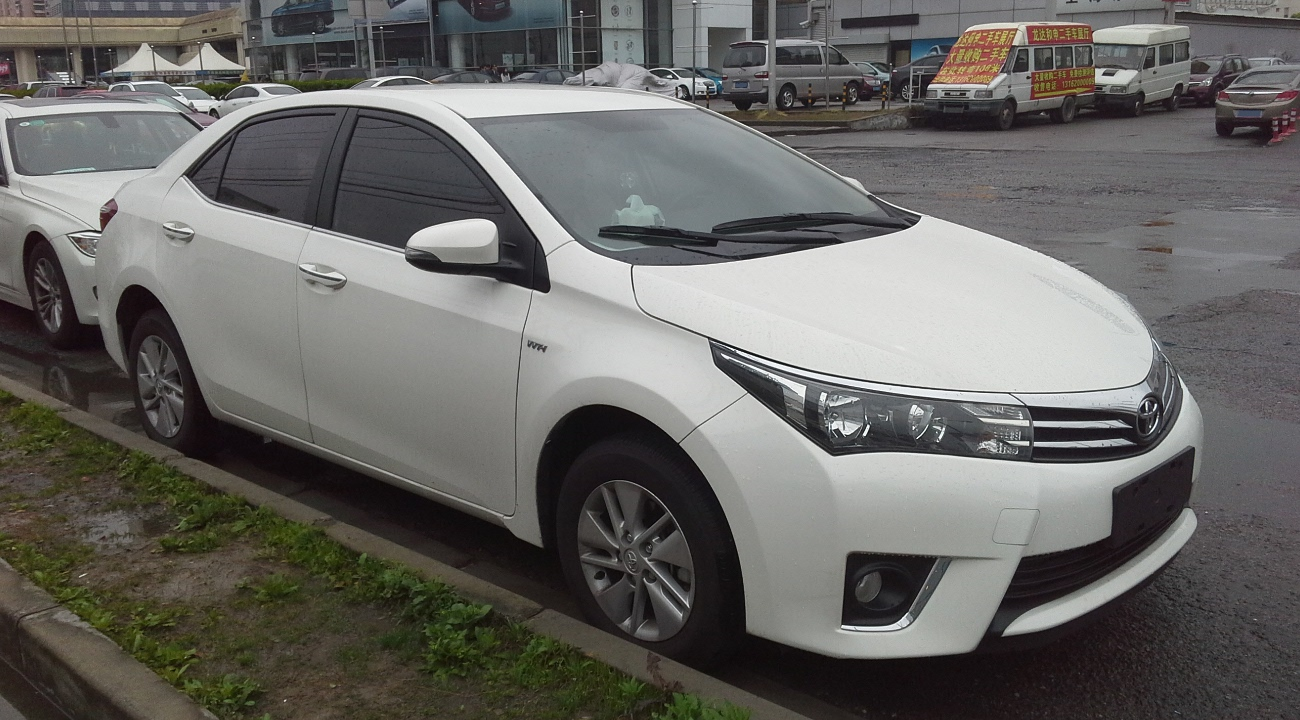
2014–2017
丰田卡罗拉E170
Toyota Corolla E170

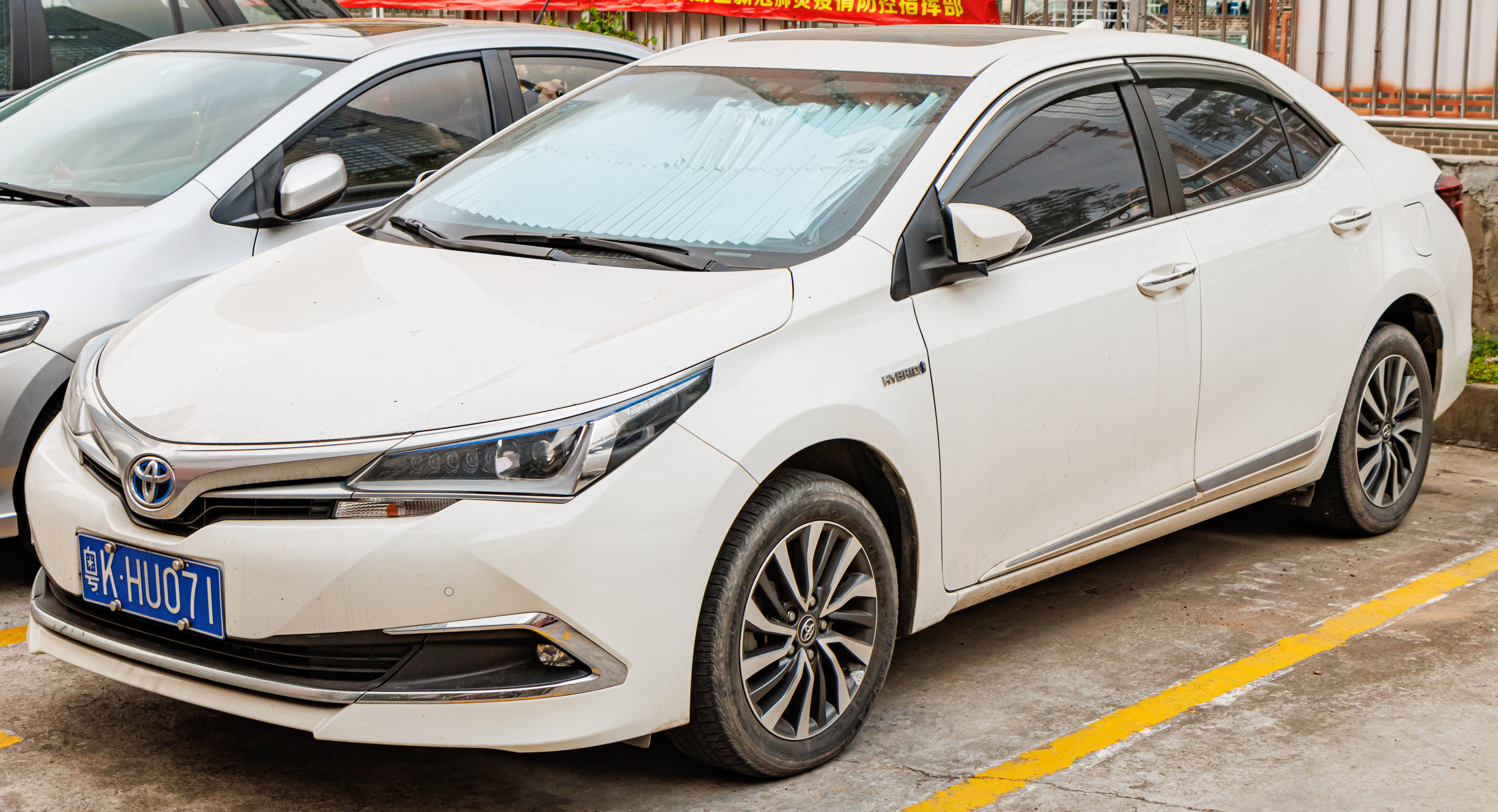
2015–2019
丰田卡罗拉双擎E170
Toyota Corolla Hybrid E170

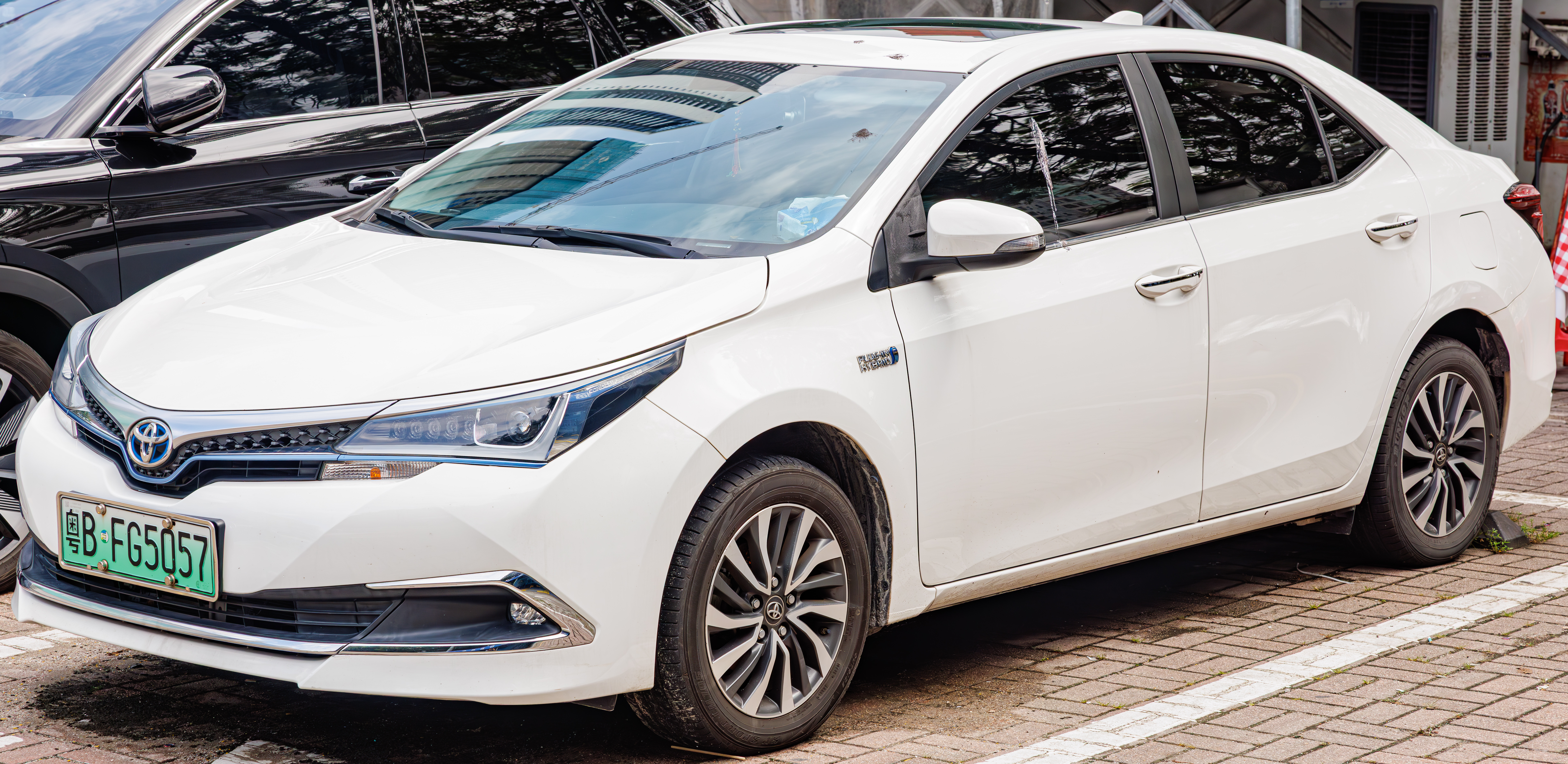
2015–2019
丰田卡罗拉双擎E+E170
Toyota Corolla Hybrid E+ E170

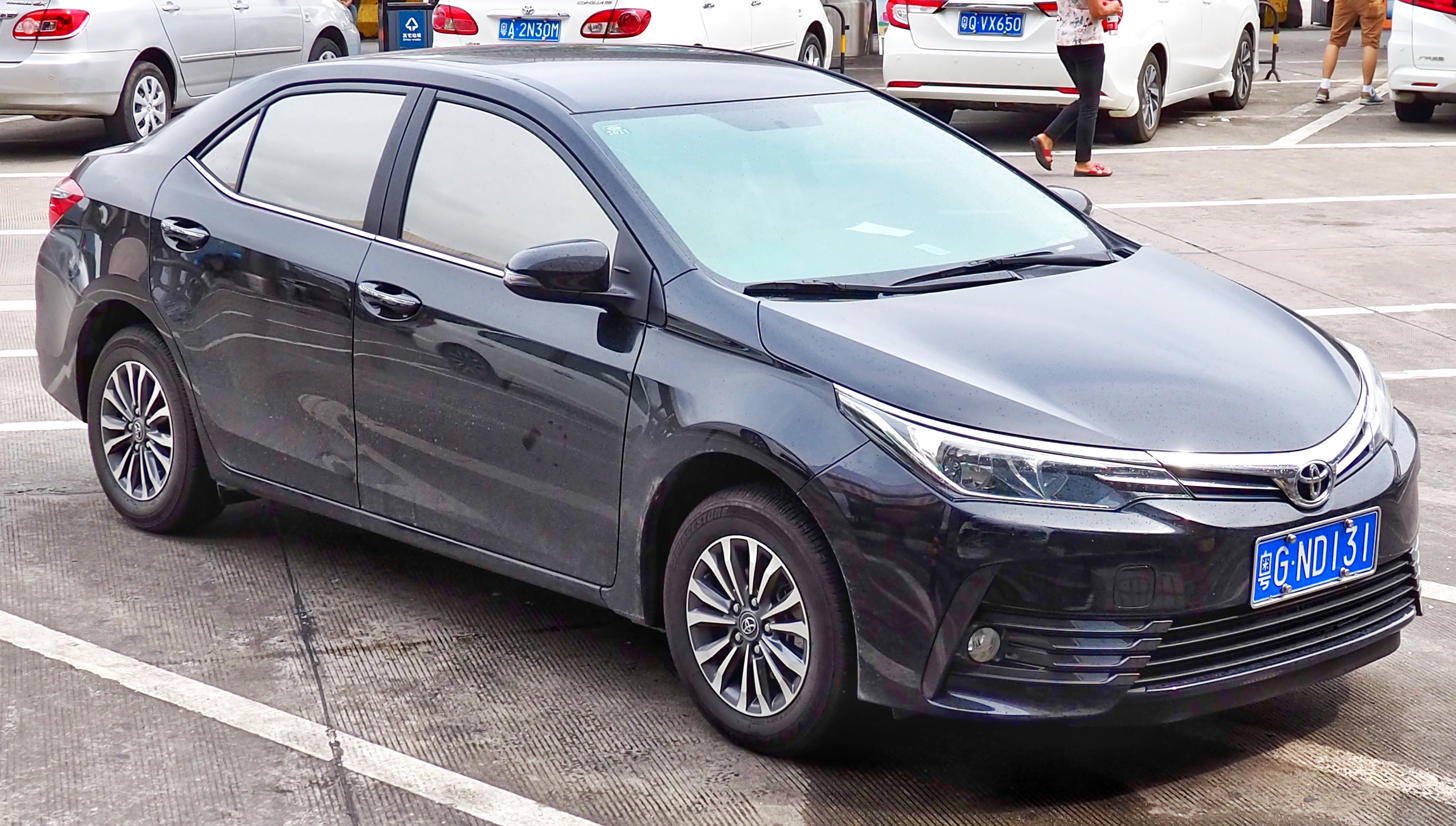
2017–2019
丰田卡罗拉E170
Toyota Corolla E170

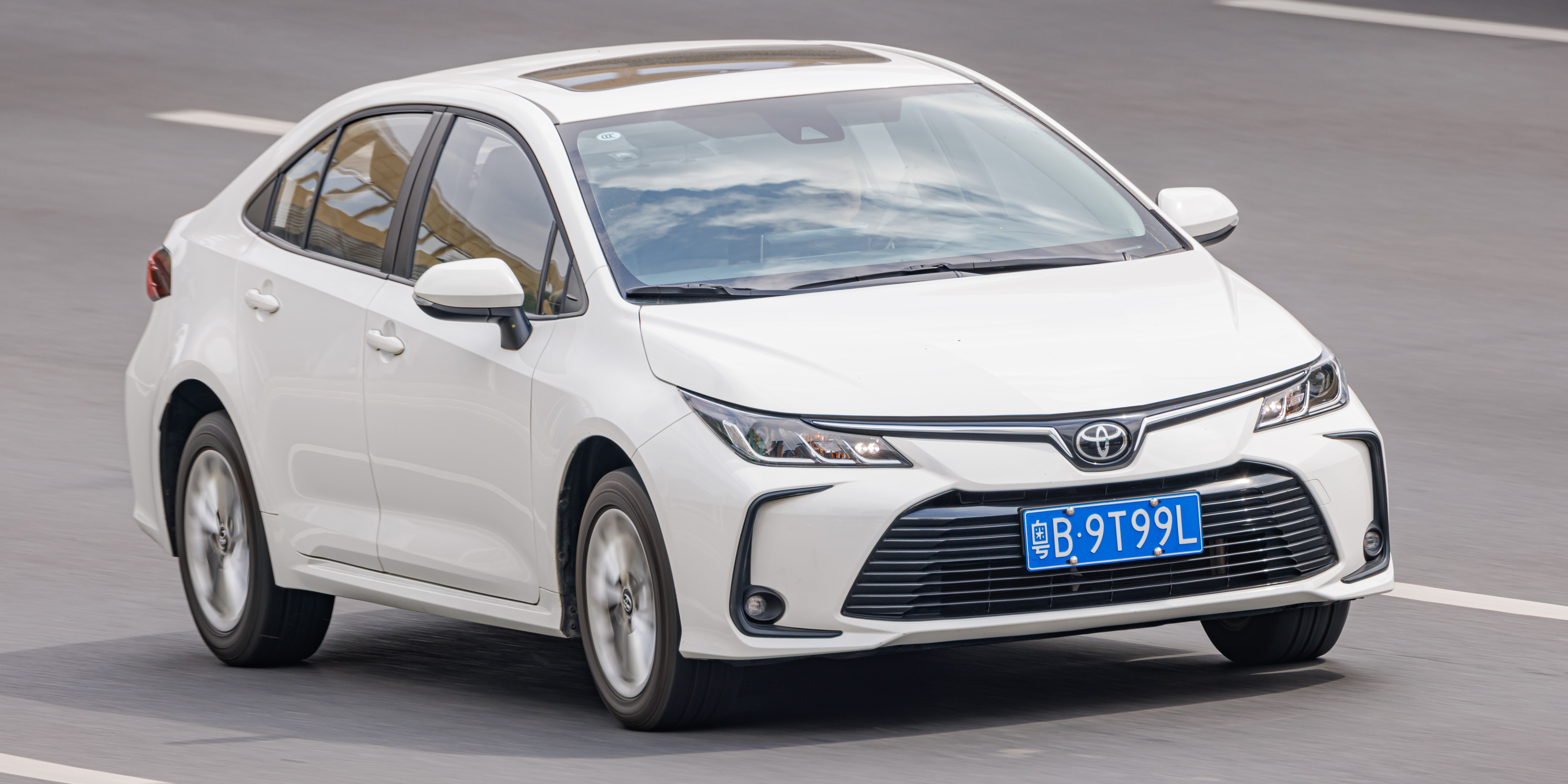
2019–2025
丰田卡罗拉E210
Toyota Corolla E210

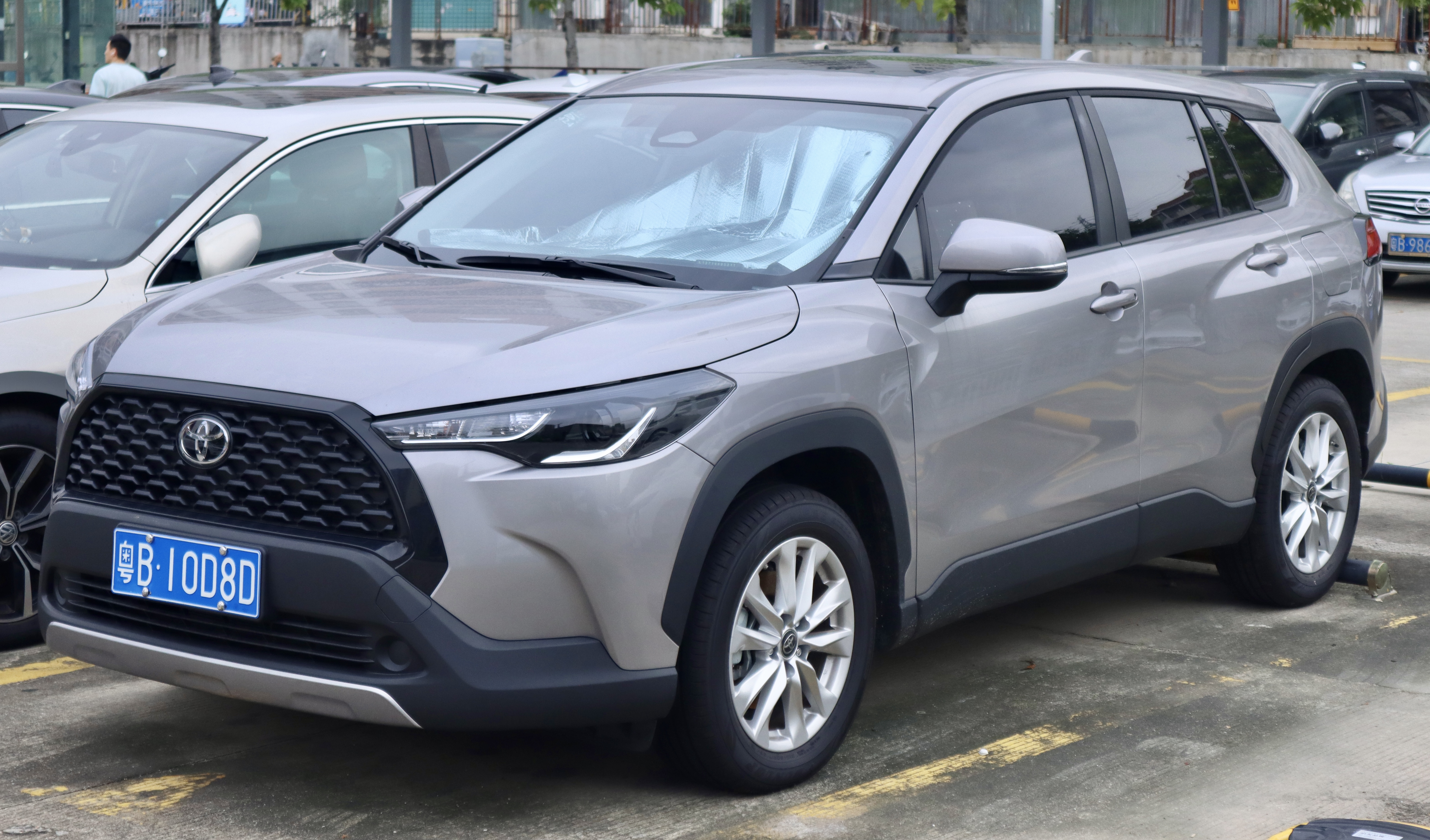
2021–2025
丰田卡罗拉锐放XG10
Toyota Corolla Cross XG10

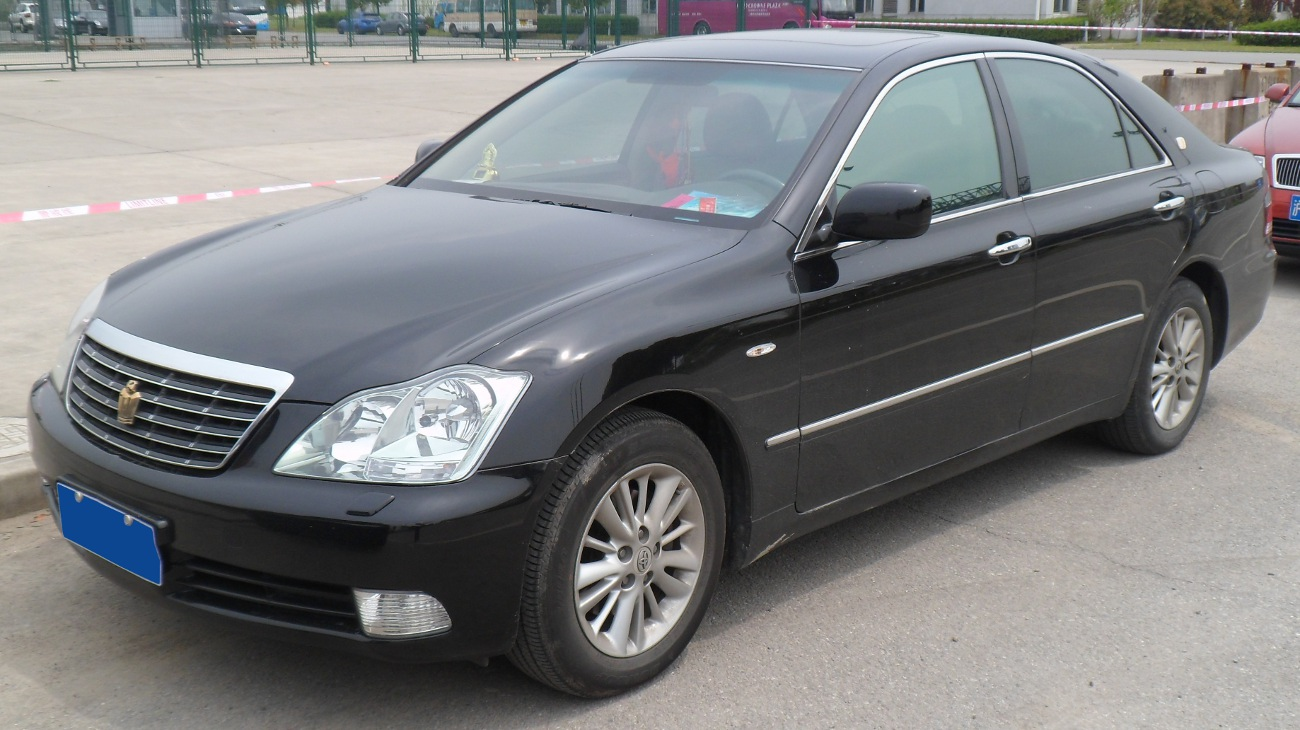
2005–2009
丰田皇冠S180
Toyota Crown S180

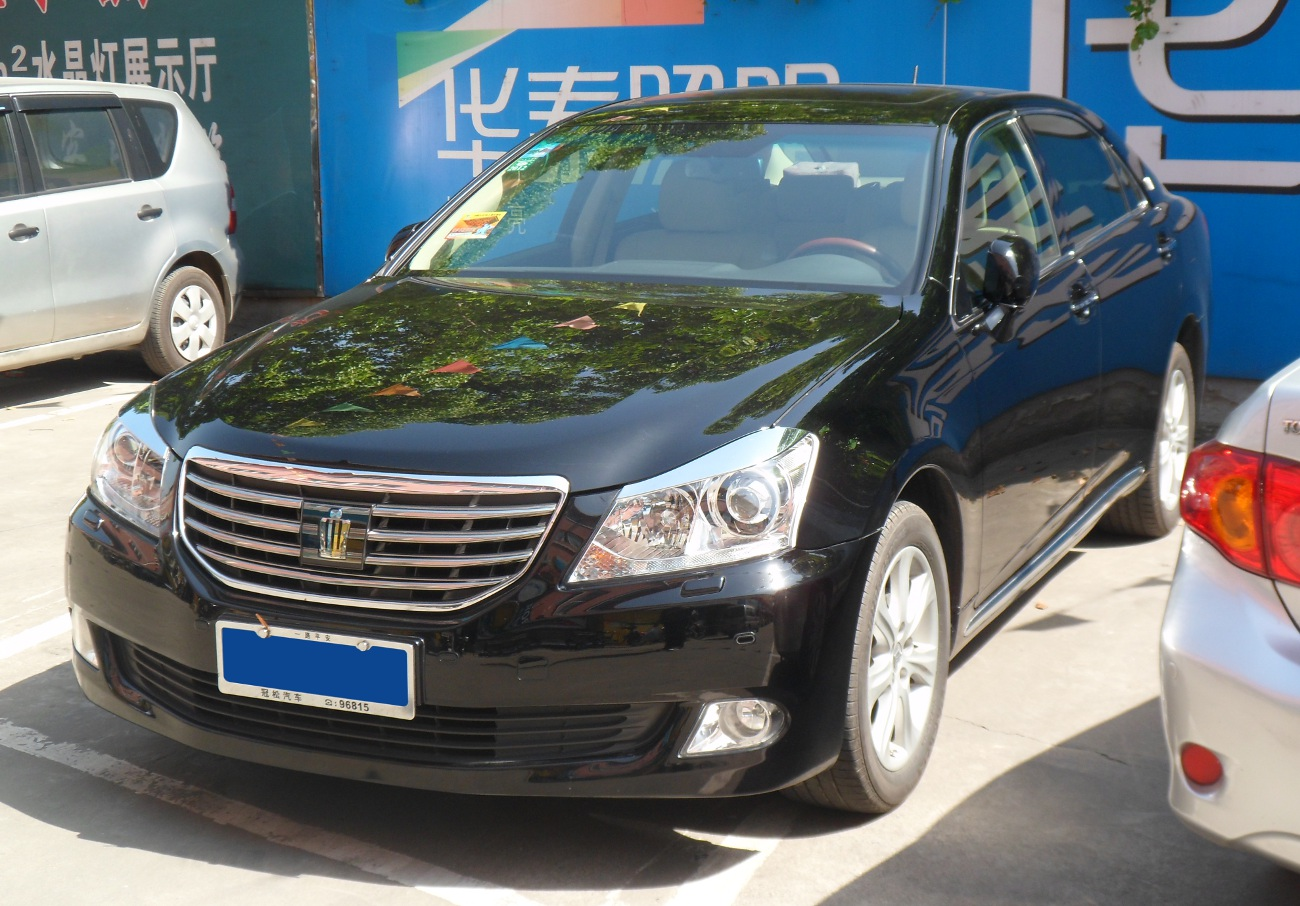
2009–2012
丰田皇冠S200
Toyota Crown S200

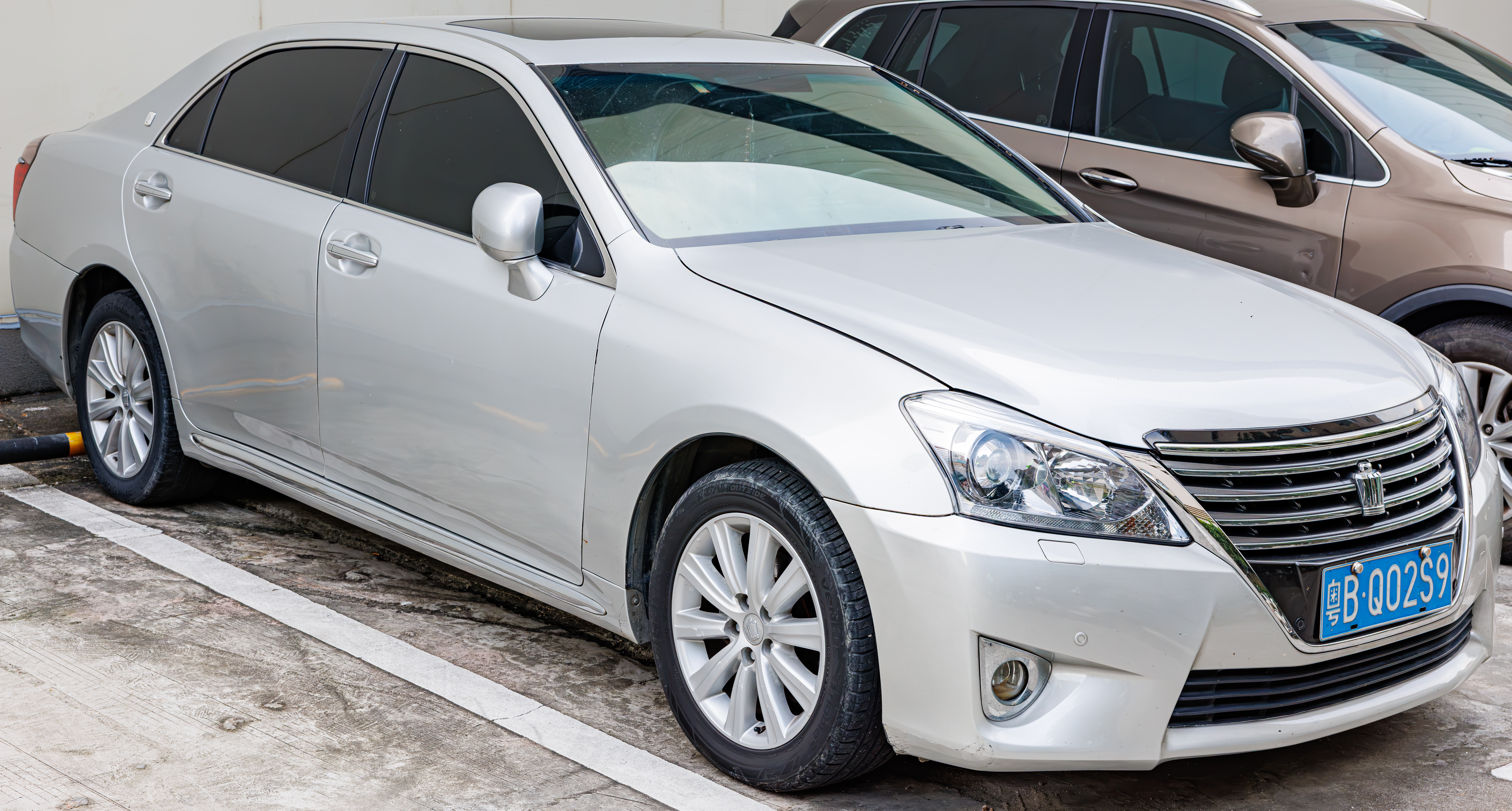
2012–2015
丰田皇冠S200
Toyota Crown S200

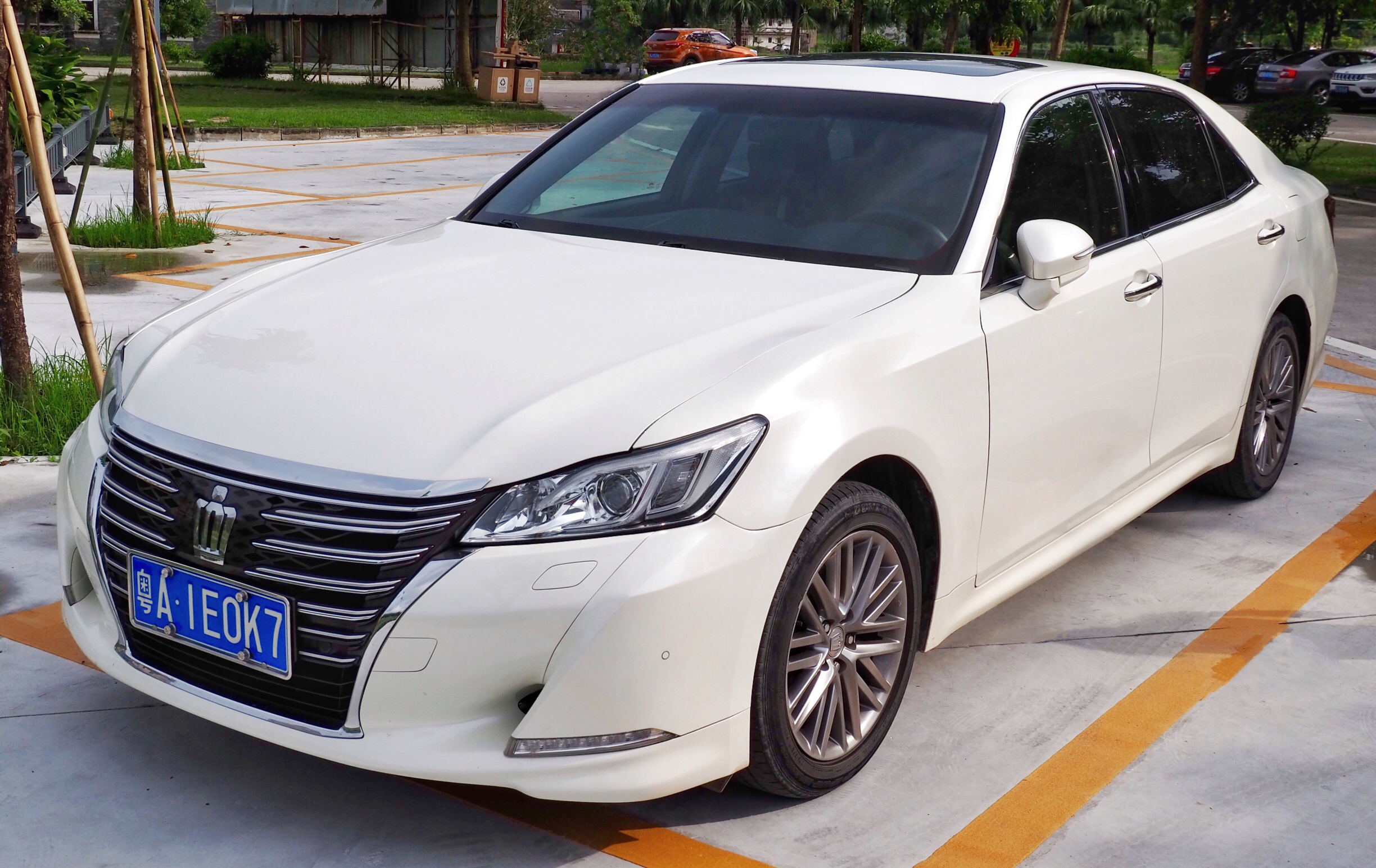
2015–2020
丰田皇冠S210
Toyota Crown S210

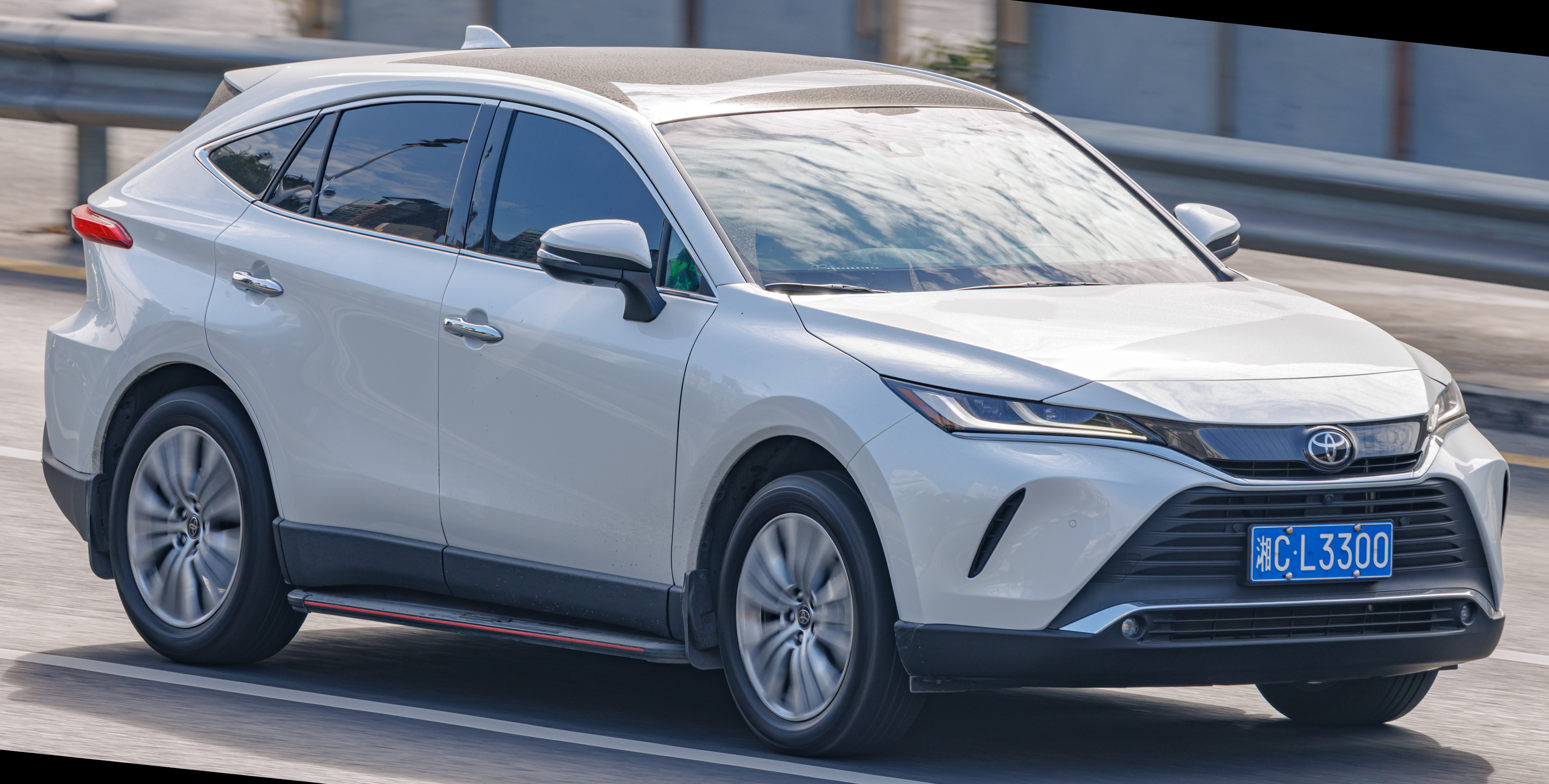
2021–2026
丰田凌放XU80
Toyota Harrier XU80

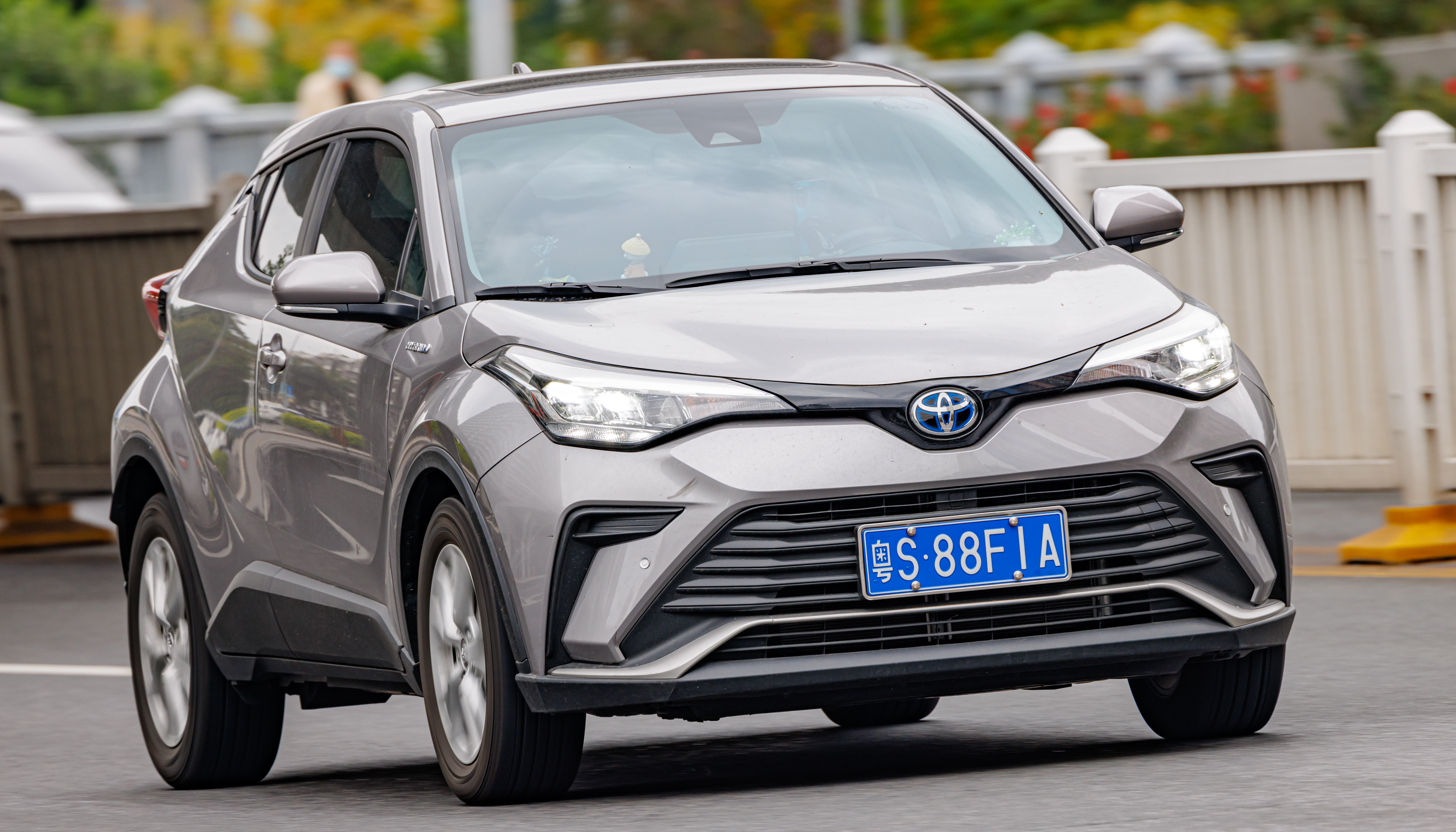
2018–2024
丰田奕泽AX10
Toyota IZOA AX10

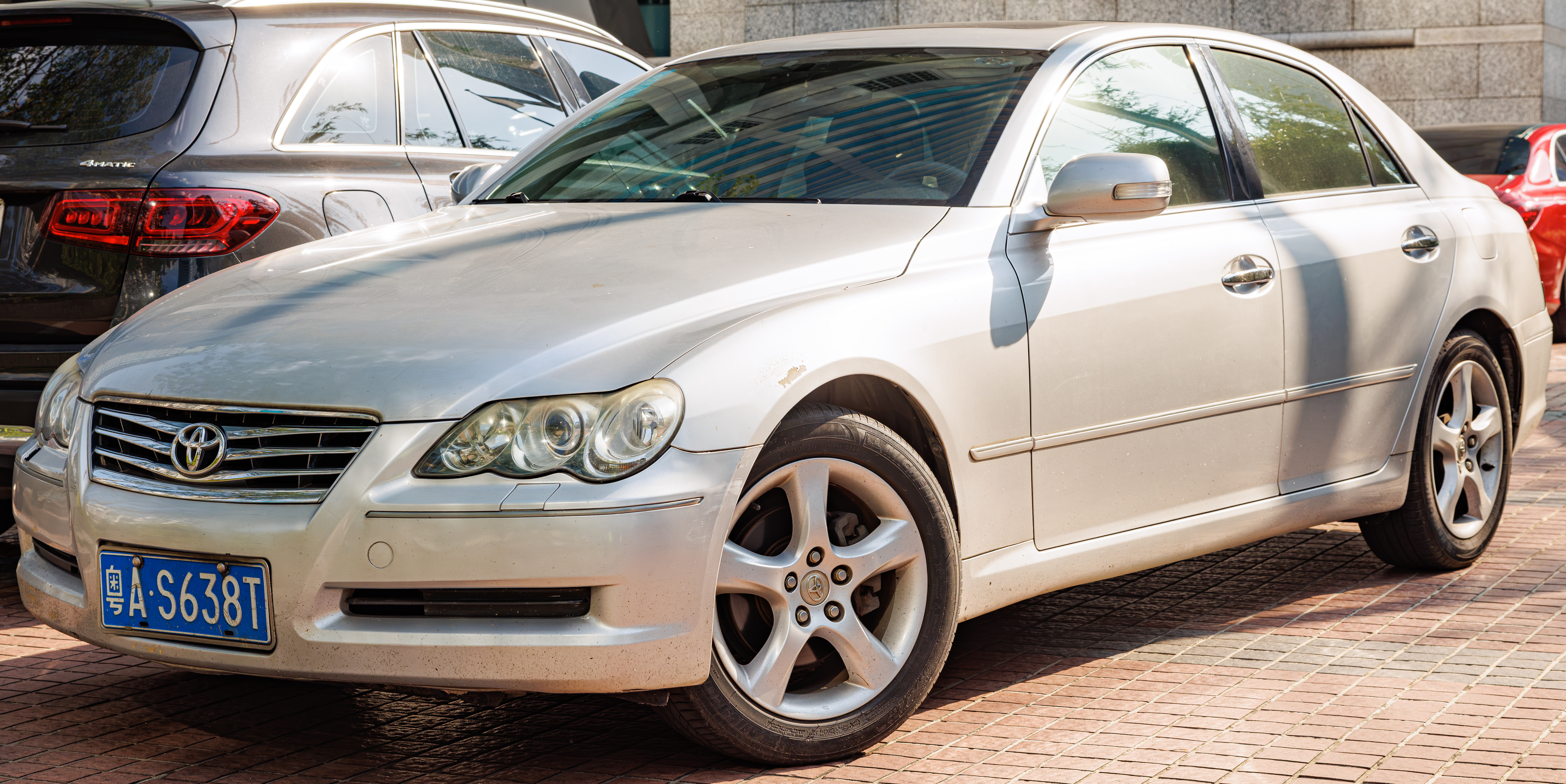
2004–2009
丰田锐志X120
Toyota Reiz X120

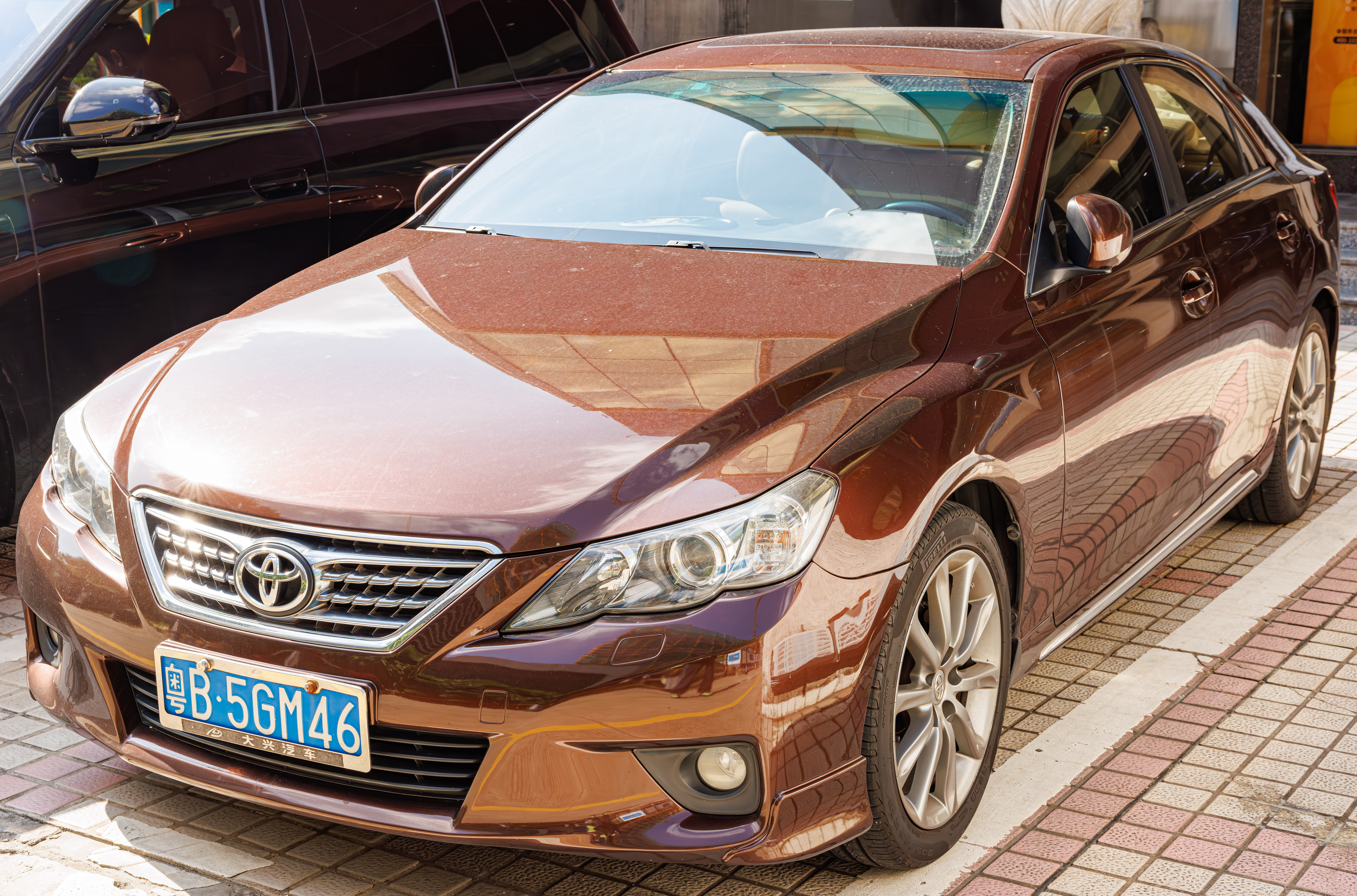
2009–2013
丰田锐志X130
Toyota Reiz X130

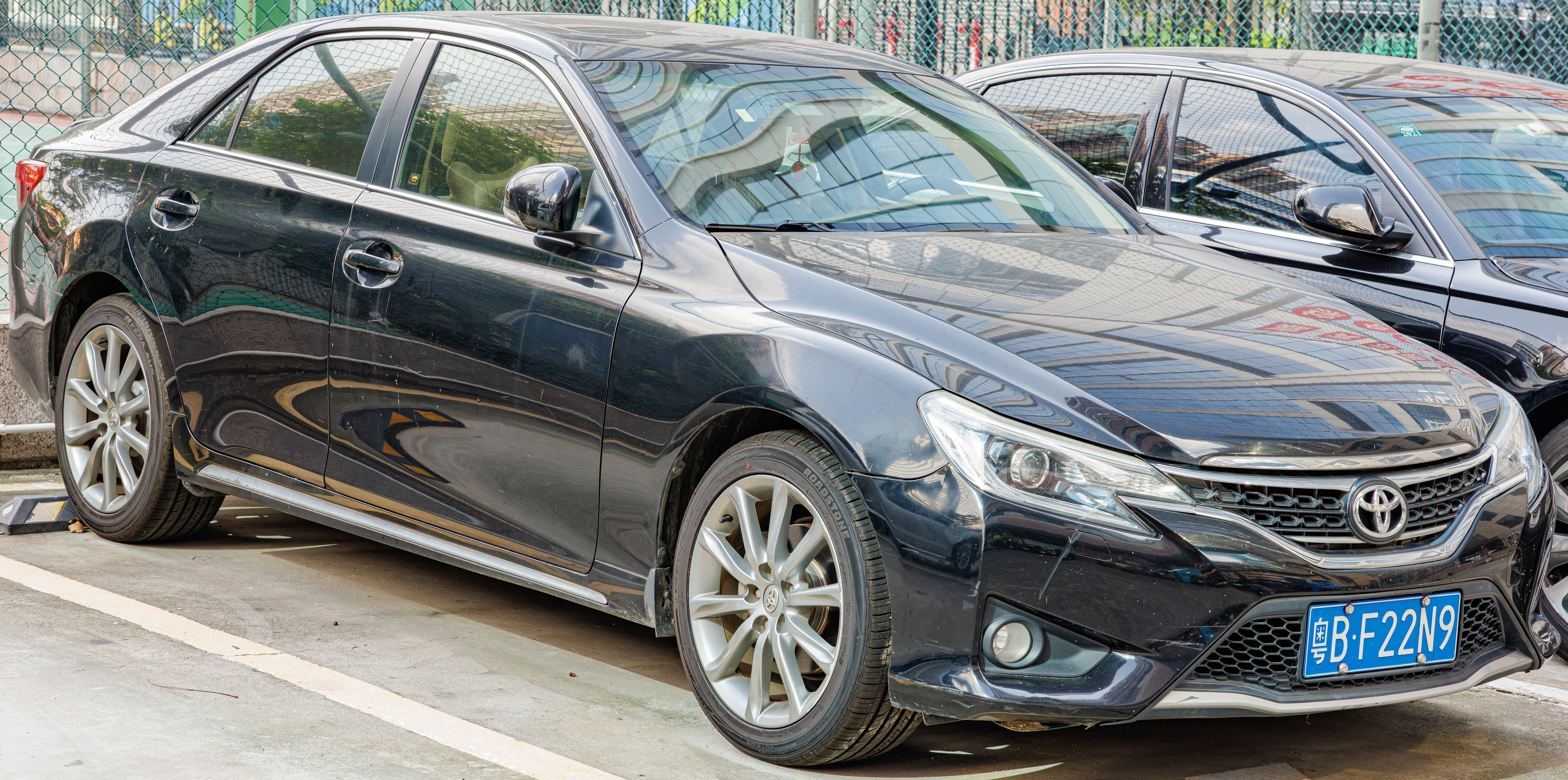
2013–2017
丰田锐志X130
Toyota Reiz X130

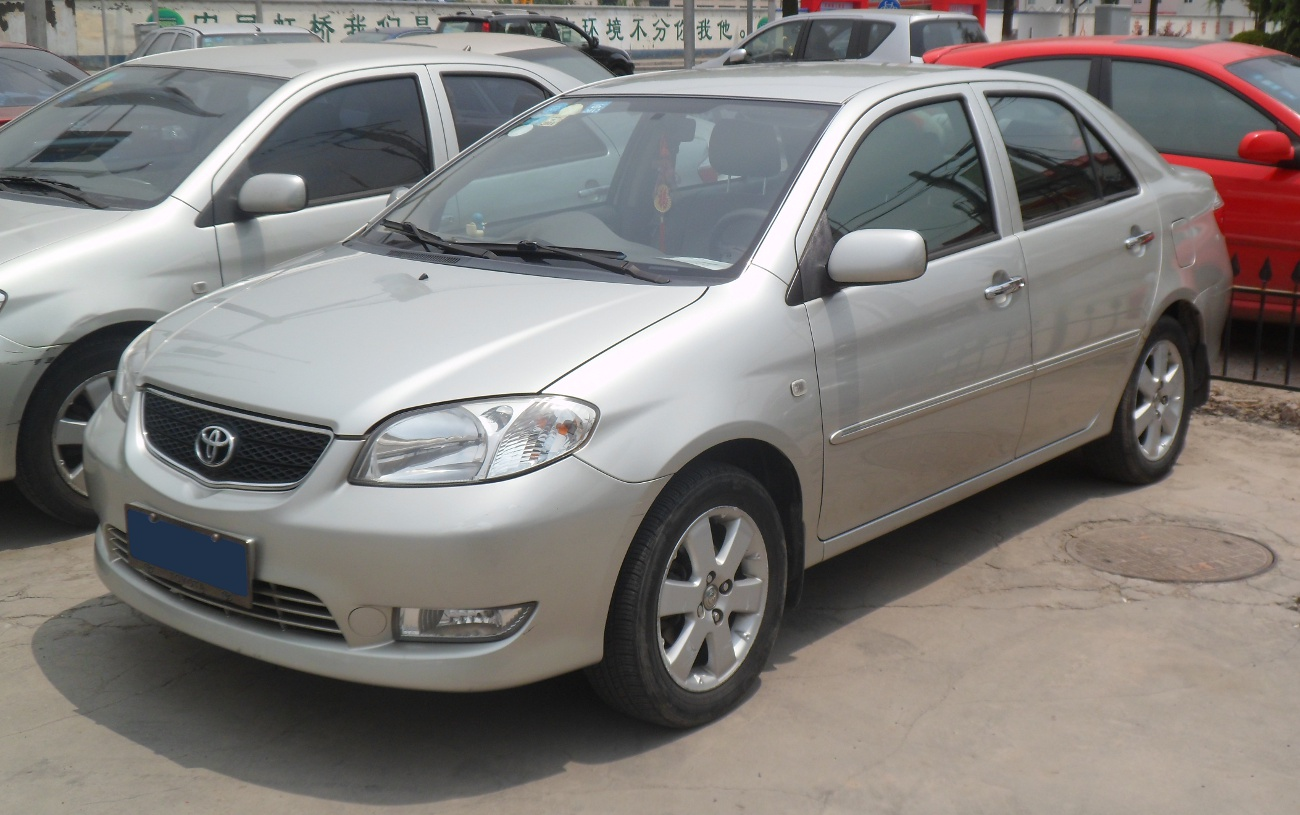
2004–2008
丰田威驰XP40
Toyota Vios XP40

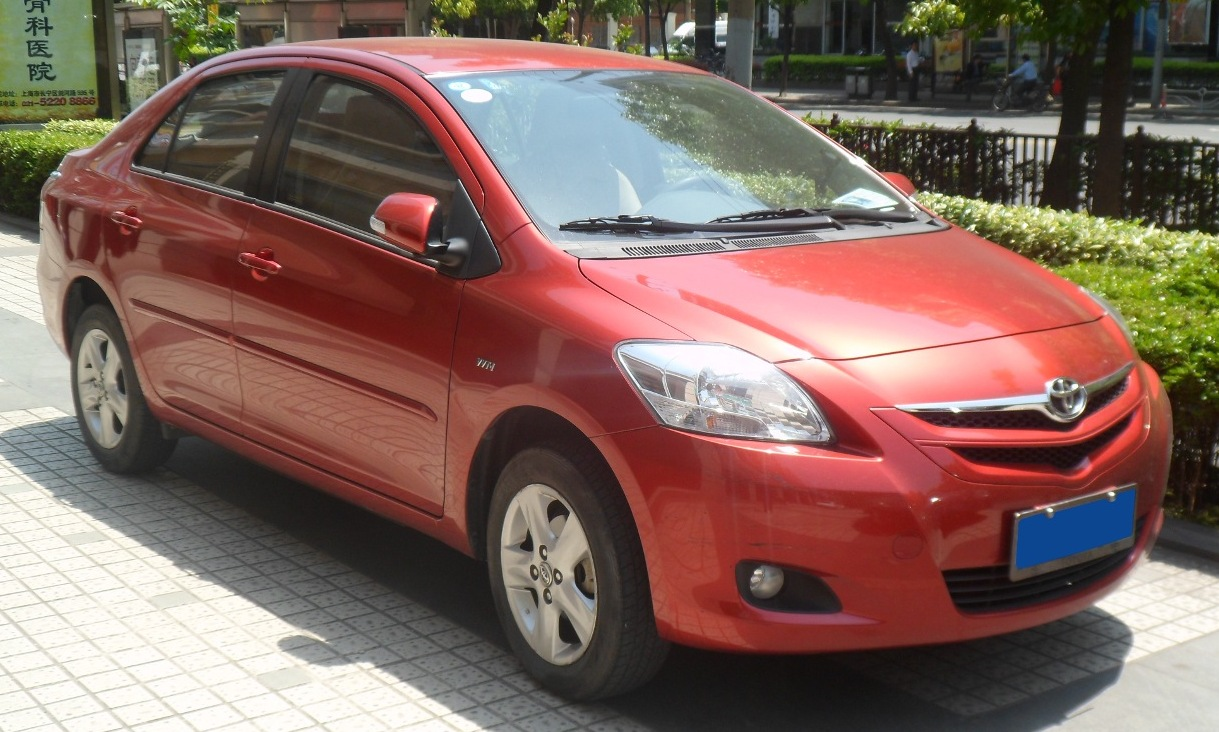
2008–2013
丰田威驰XP90
Toyota Vios XP90

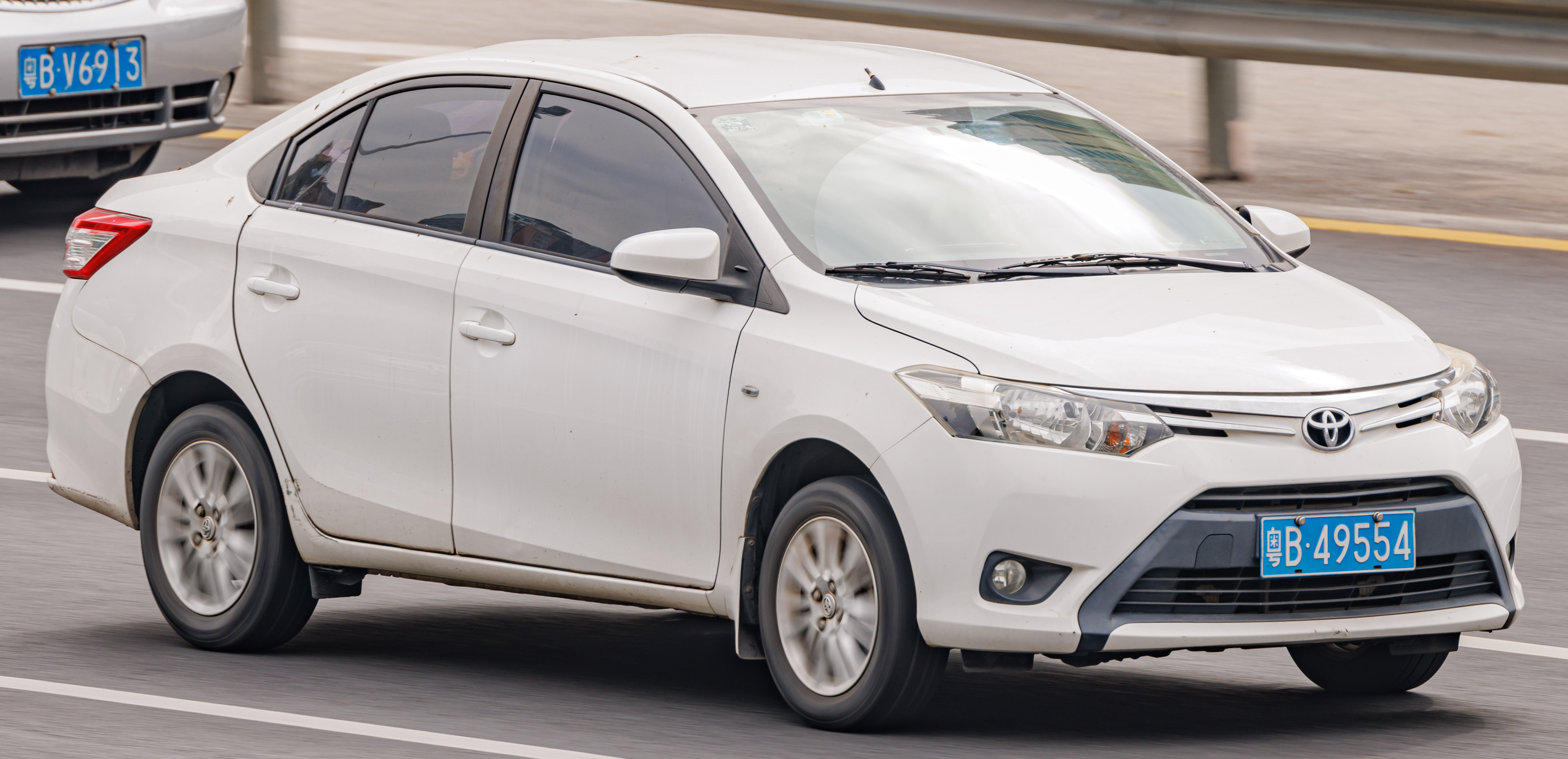
2013–2016
丰田威驰XP150
Toyota Vios XP150

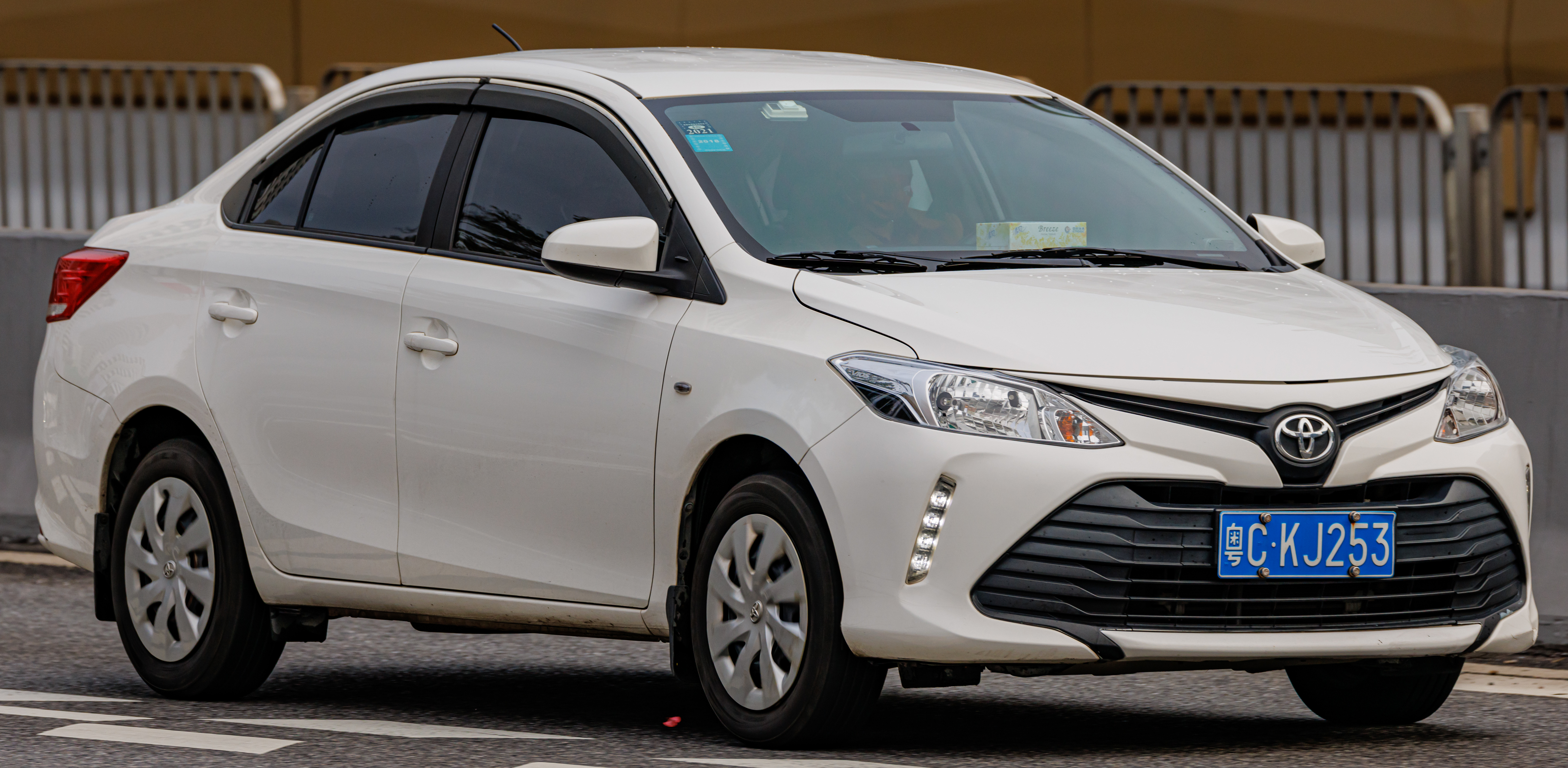
2016–2020
丰田威驰XP150
Toyota Vios XP150

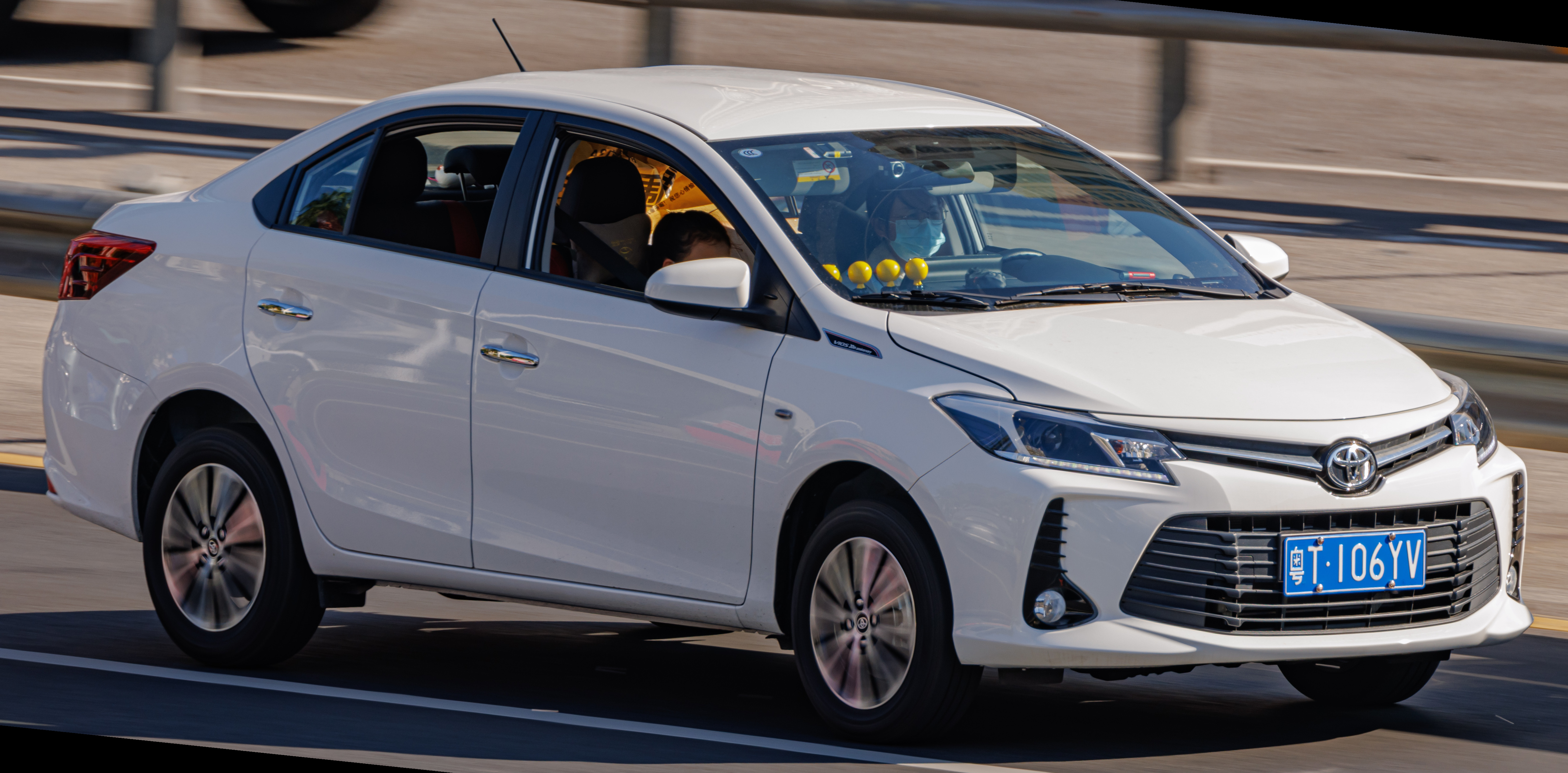
2020–2023
丰田威驰XP150
Toyota Vios XP150

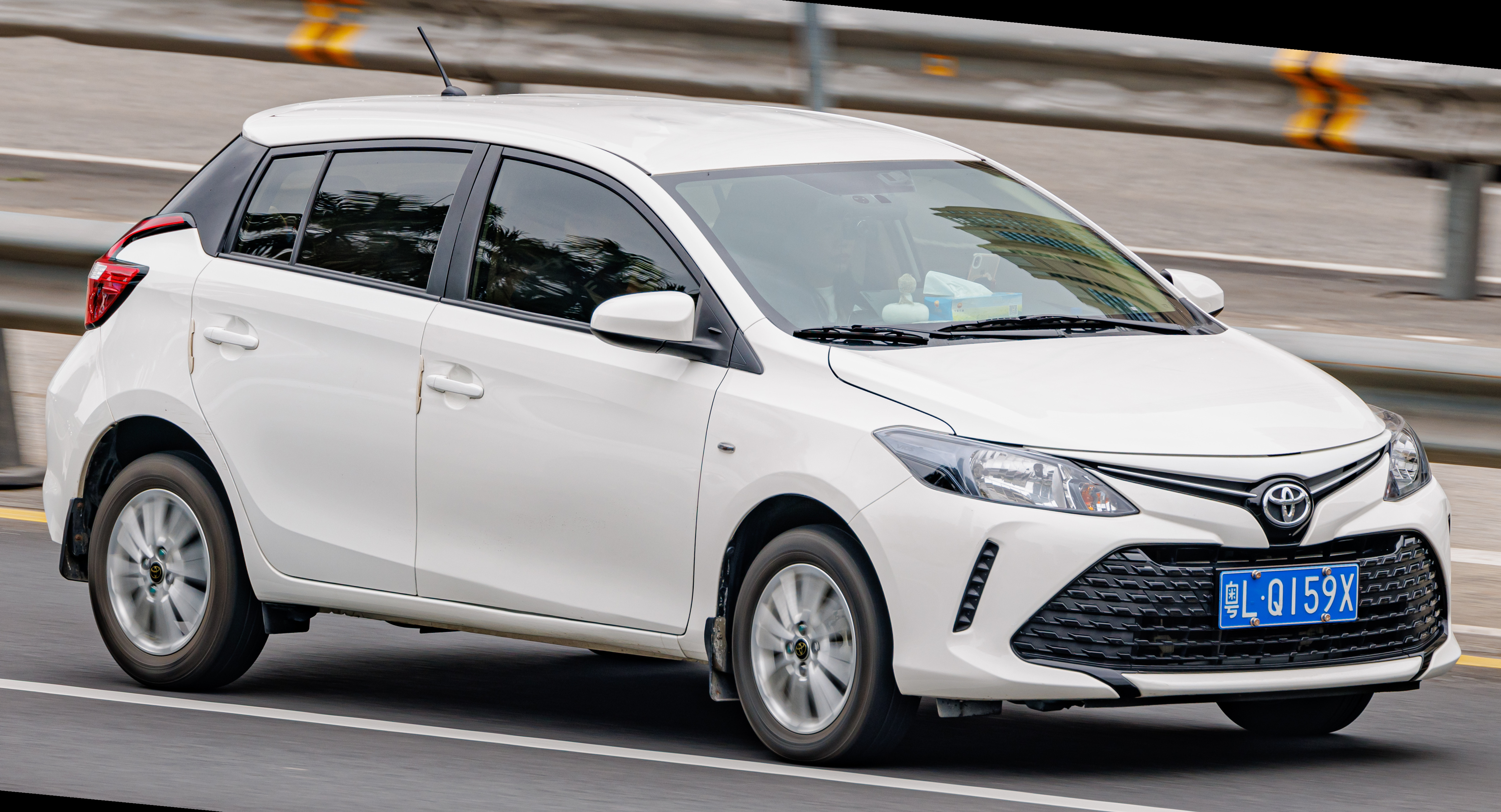
2016–2020
丰田威驰FS XP150
Toyota Vios FS XP150

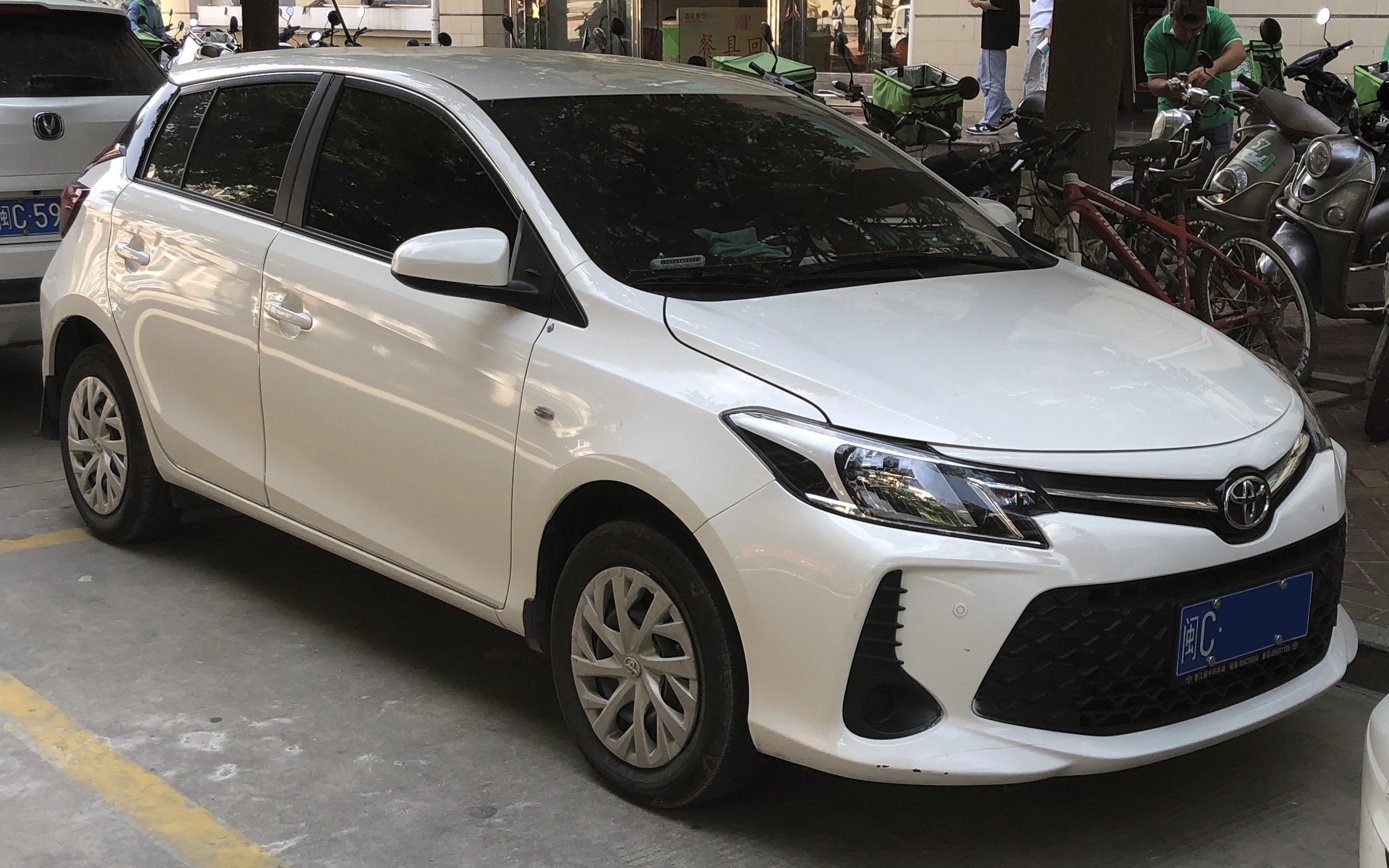
2020–2023
丰田威驰FS XP150
Toyota Vios FS XP150

===== SFTM Chengdu =====
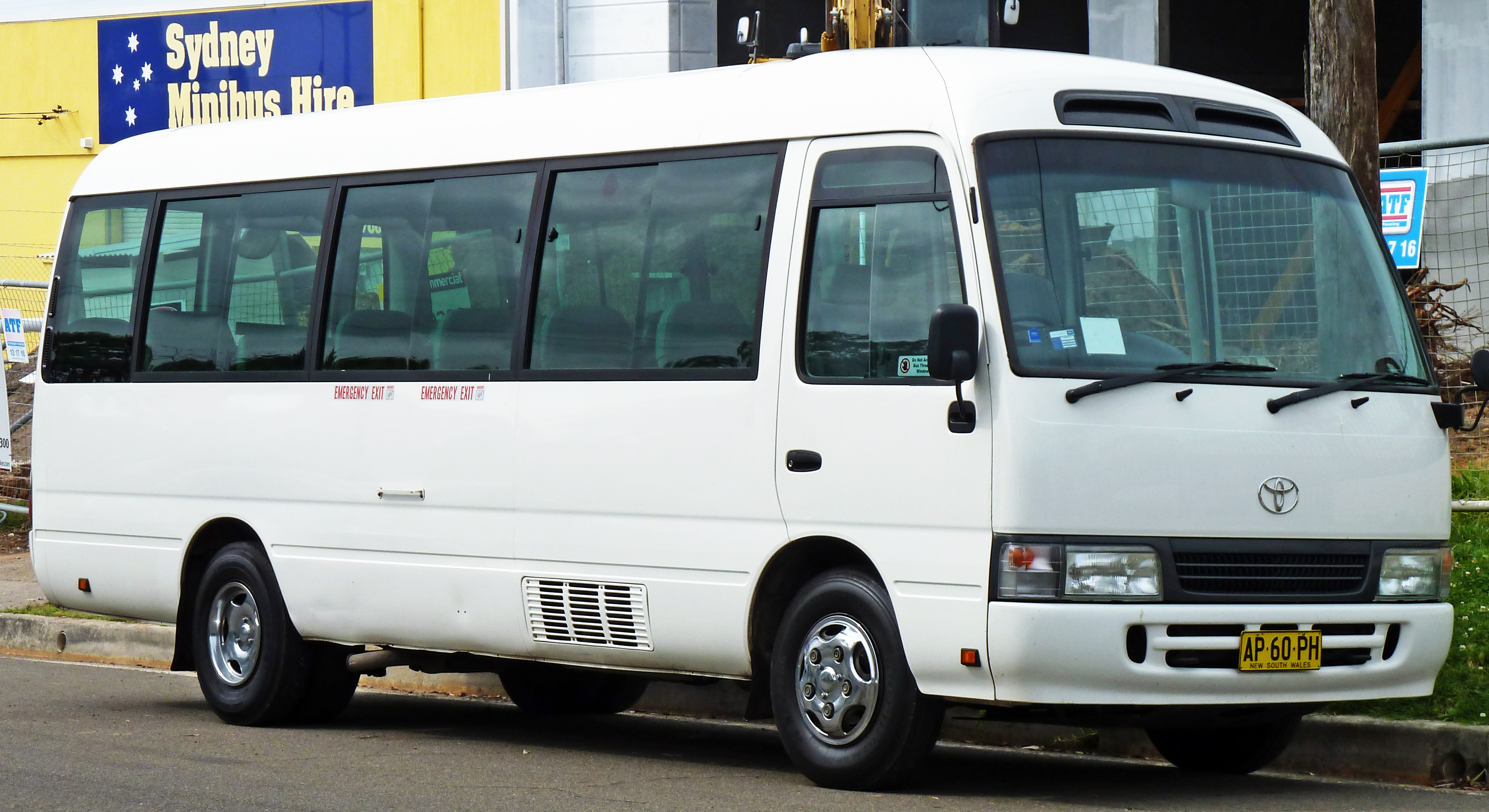
2000–2007
丰田柯斯达B50
Toyota Coaster B50

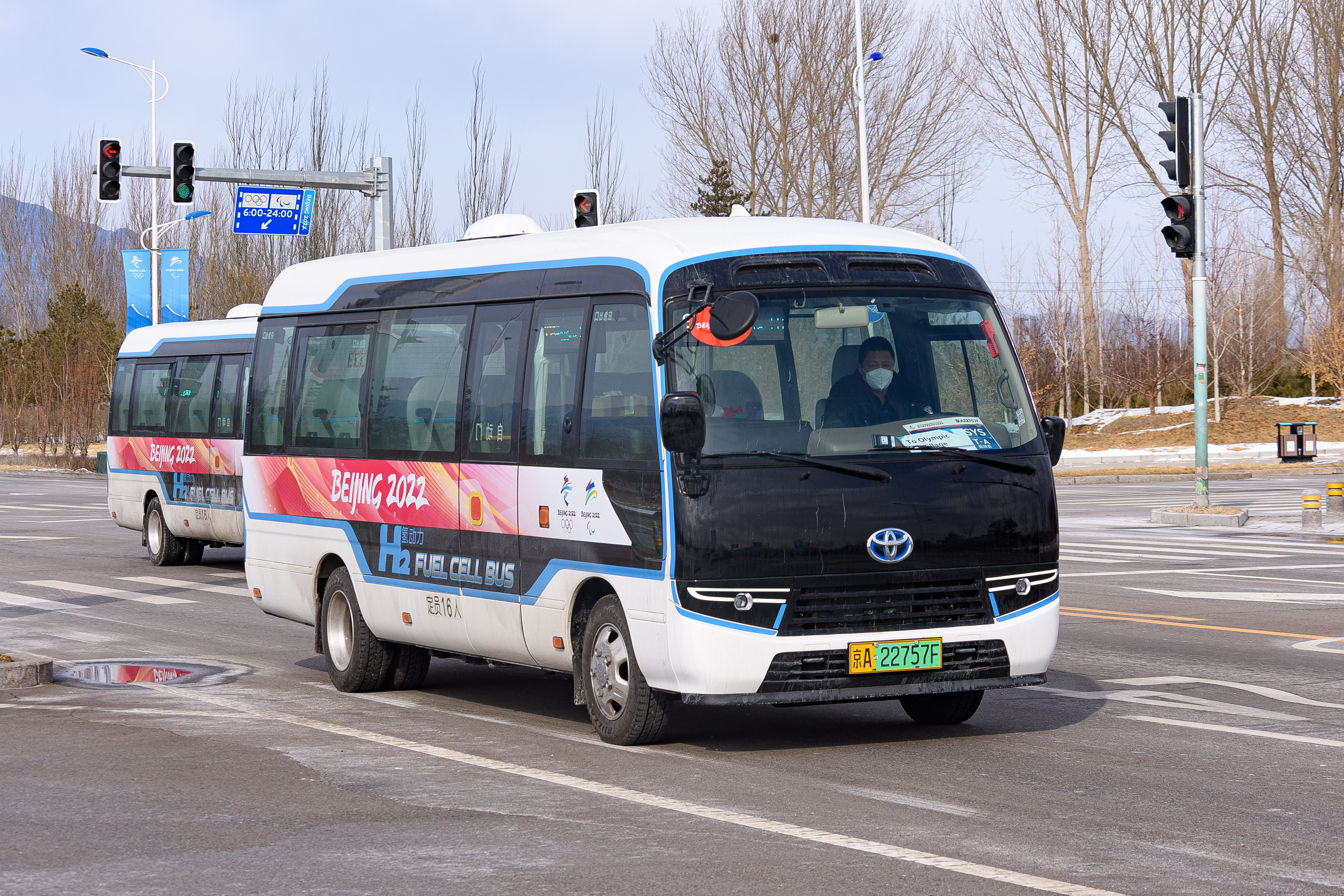
2021
丰田柯斯达氢擎B50
Toyota Coaster FCV B50

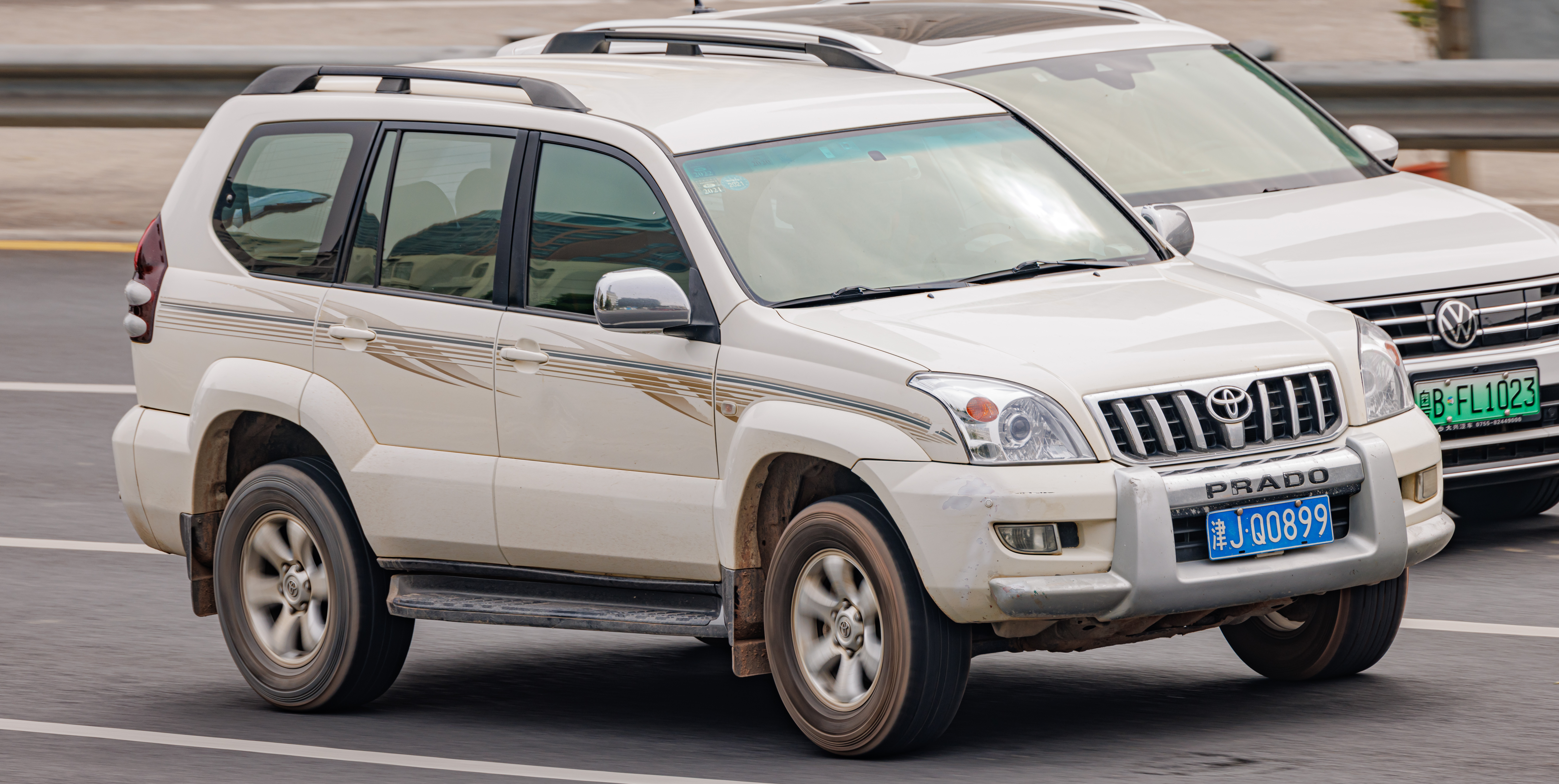
2003–2010
丰田霸道/普拉多J120
Toyota Land Cruiser Prado J120

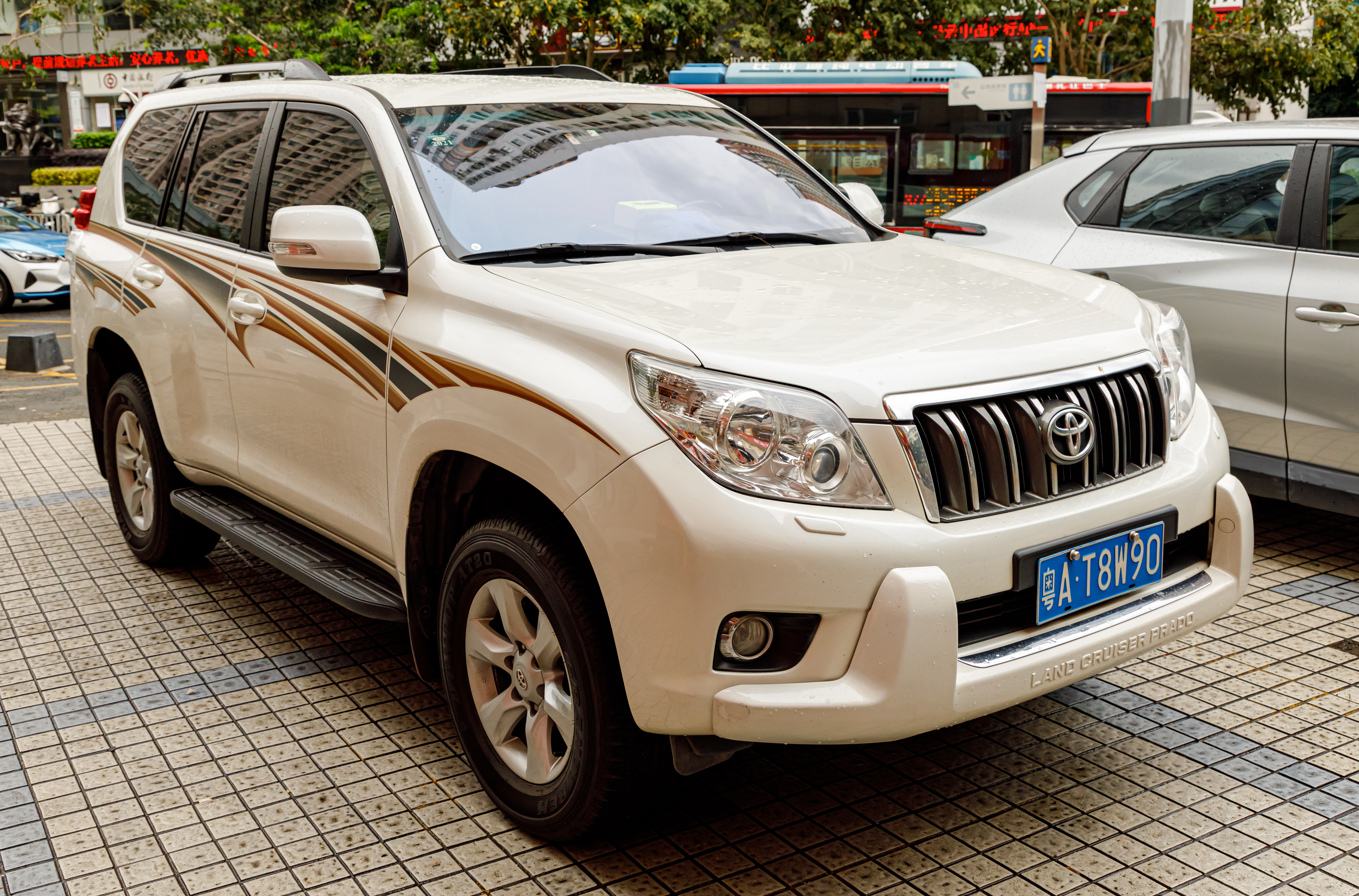
2010–2013
丰田普拉多J150 4.0L
Toyota Land Cruiser Prado J150 4.0L

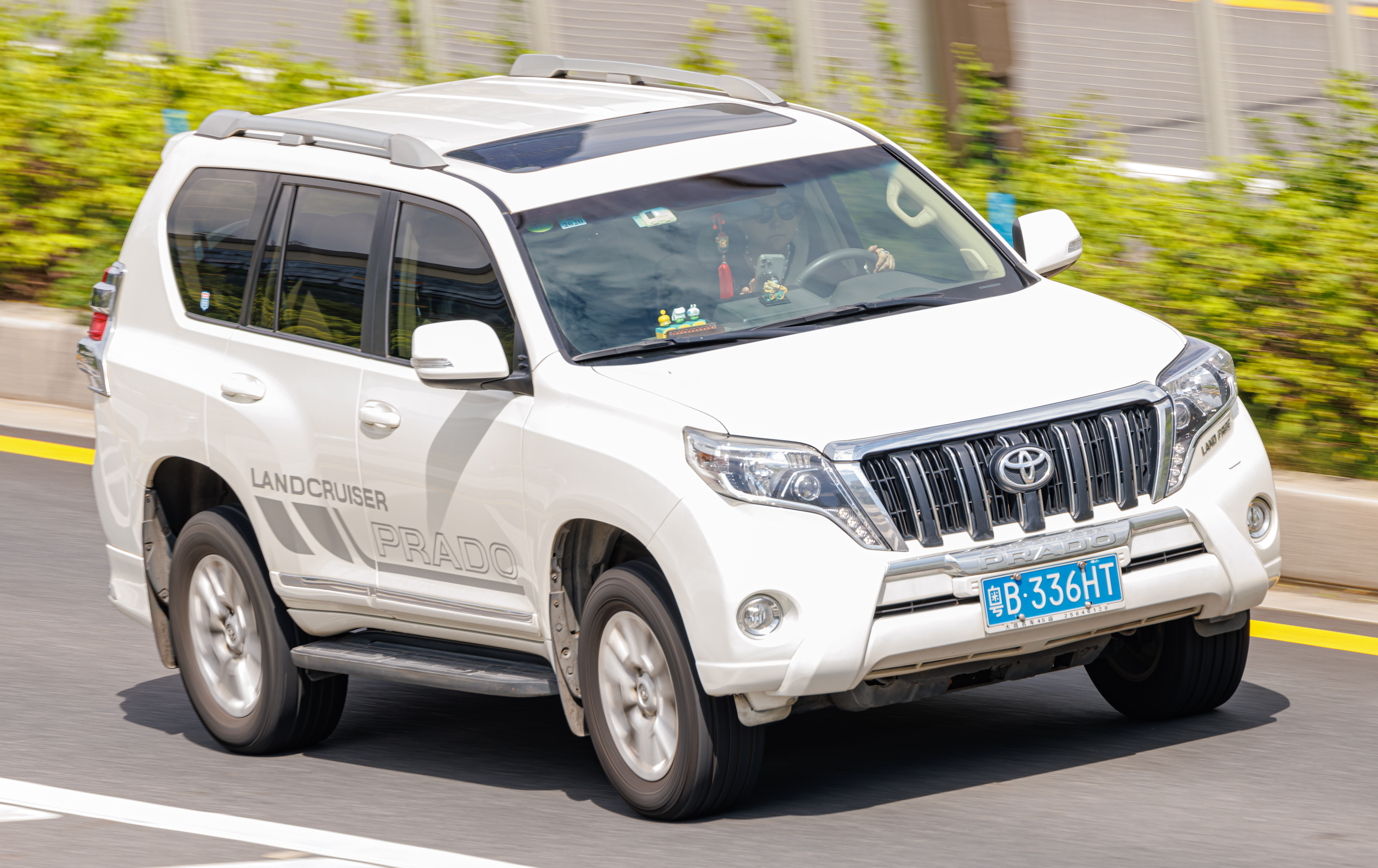
2013–2017
丰田普拉多J150
Toyota Land Cruiser Prado J150

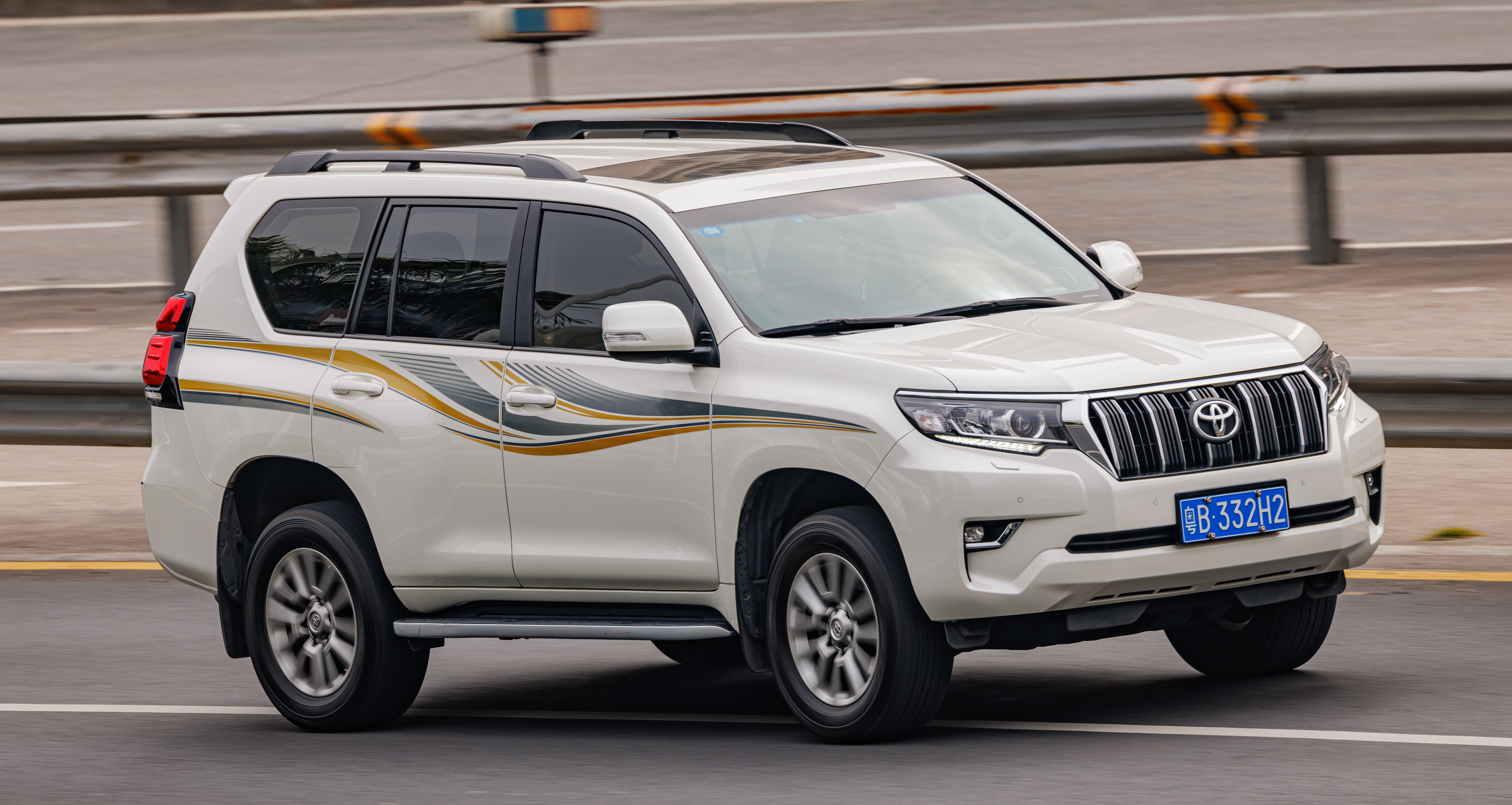
2018–2020
丰田普拉多J150
Toyota Land Cruiser Prado J150

===== SFTM Changchun =====
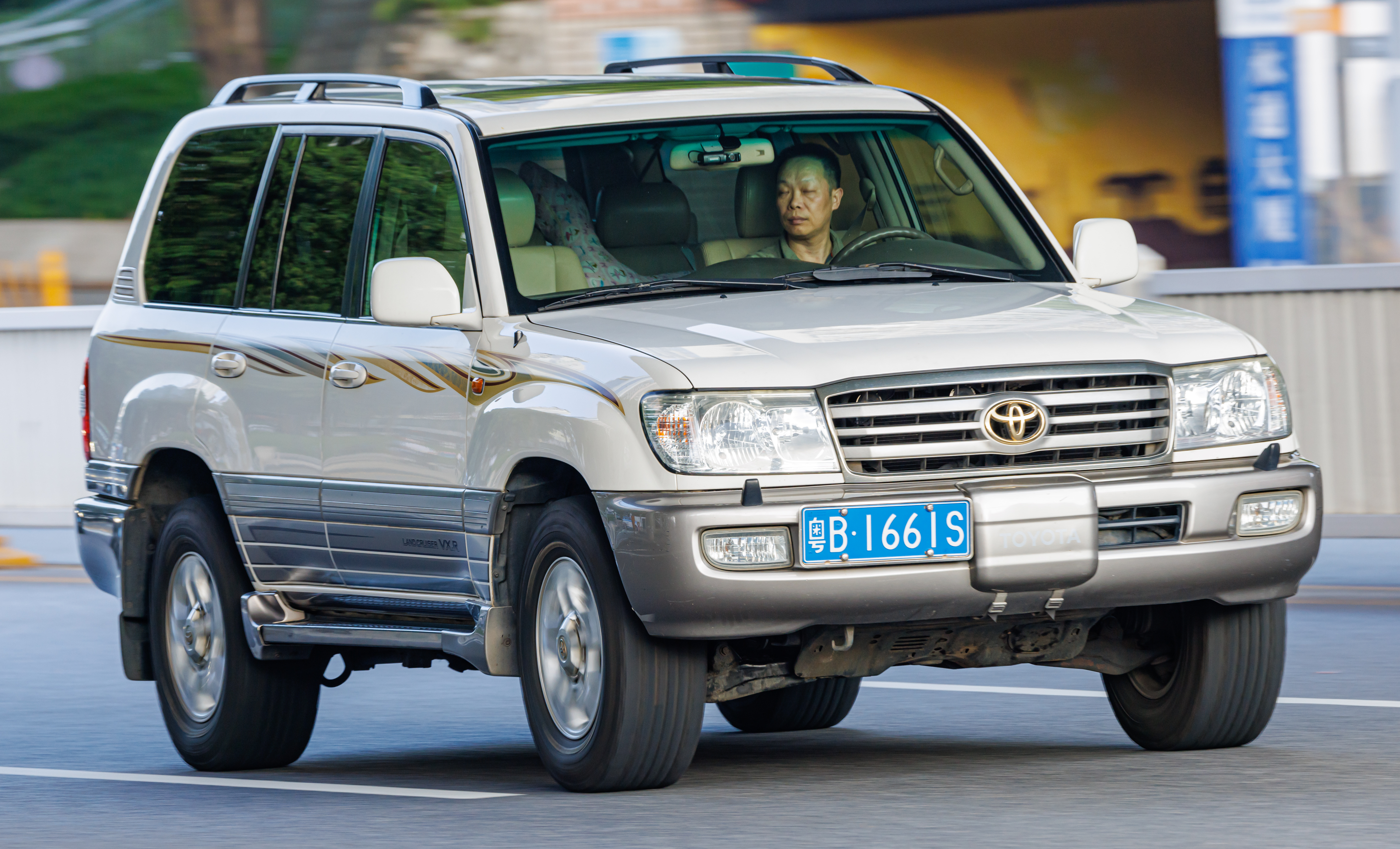
2003–2008
丰田陆地巡洋舰J100
Toyota Land Cruiser J100

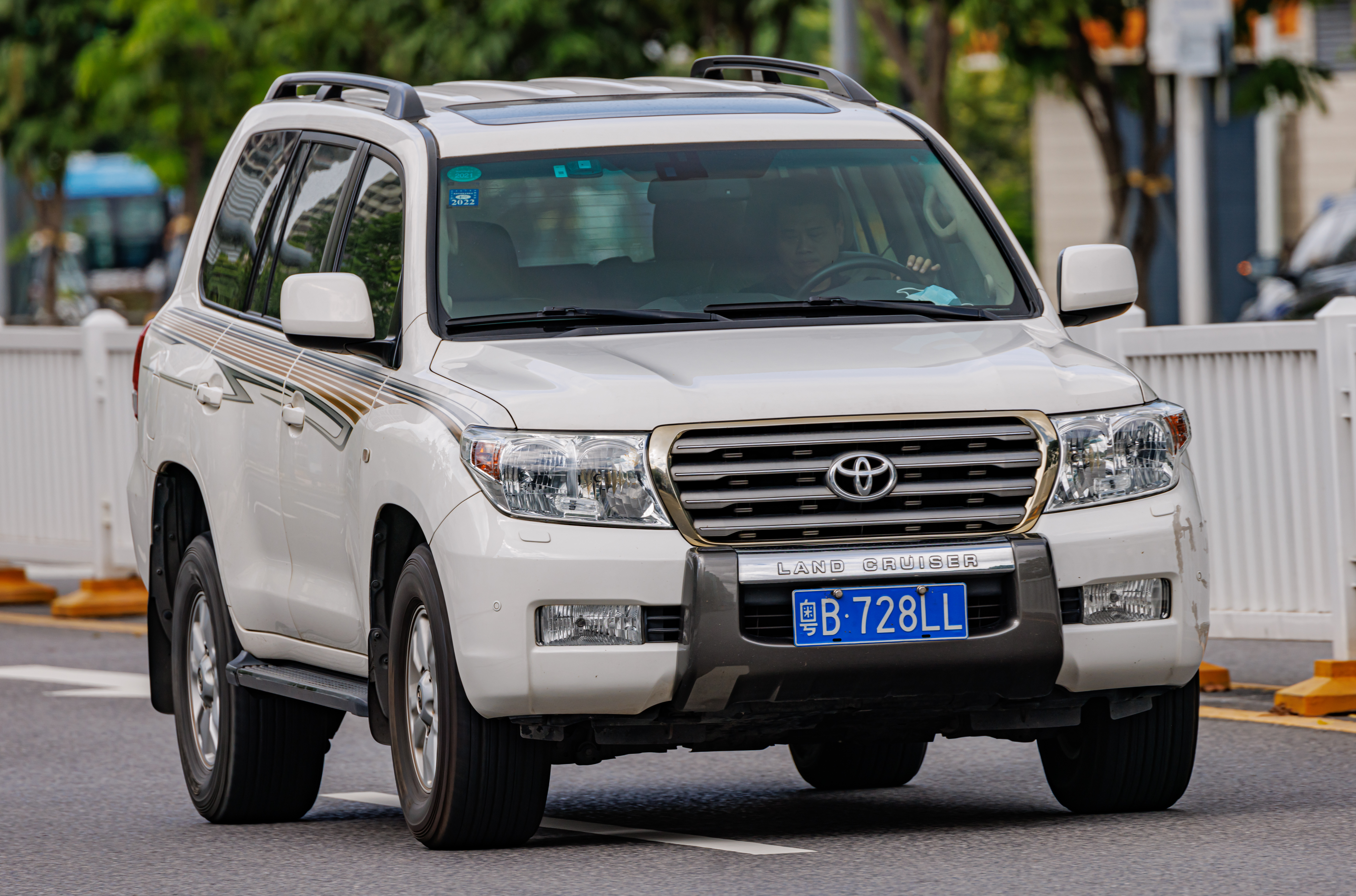
2008–2012
丰田兰德酷路泽J200
Toyota Land Cruiser J200

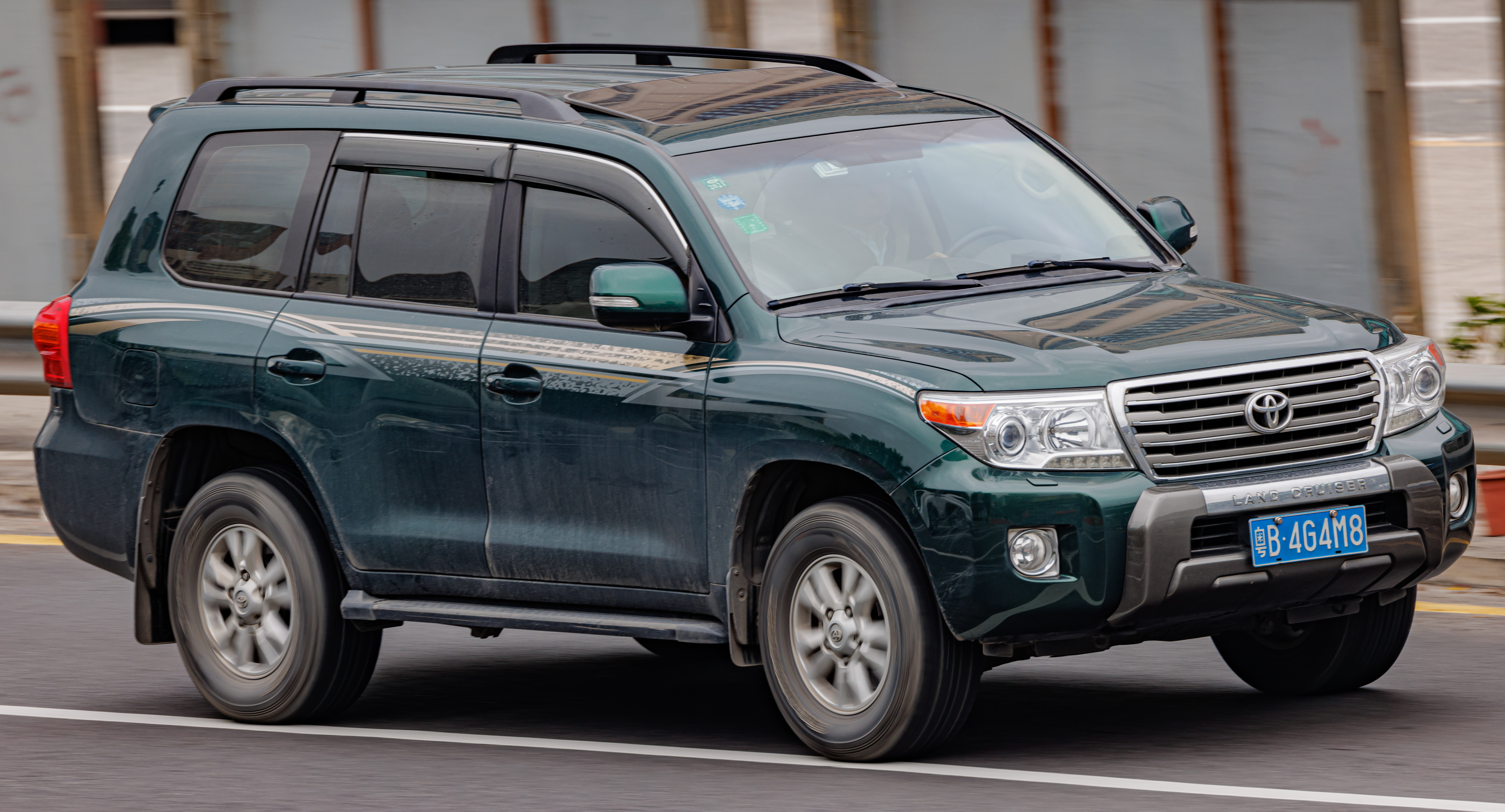
2012–2016
丰田兰德酷路泽J200
Toyota Land Cruiser J200

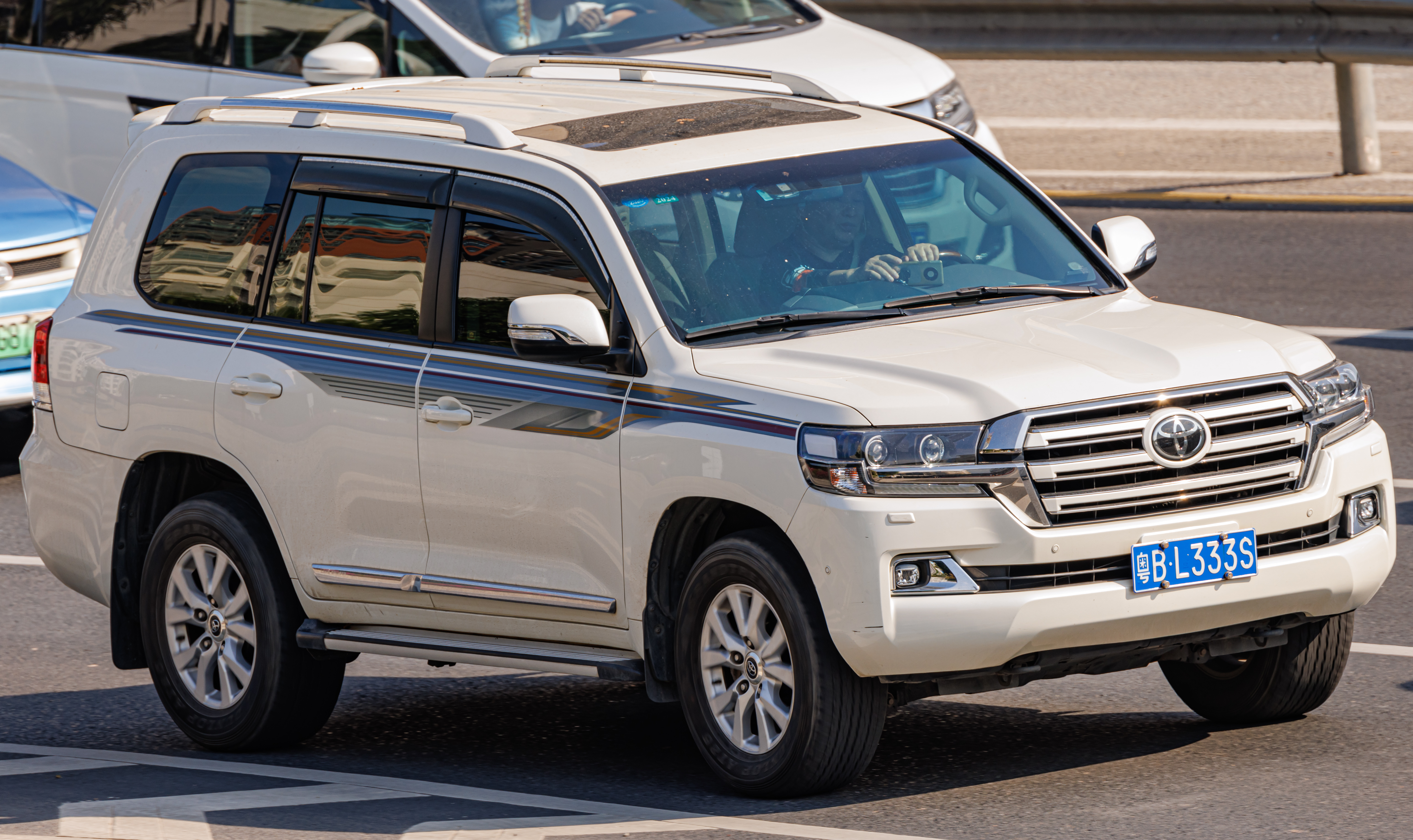
2016
丰田兰德酷路泽J200
Toyota Land Cruiser J200

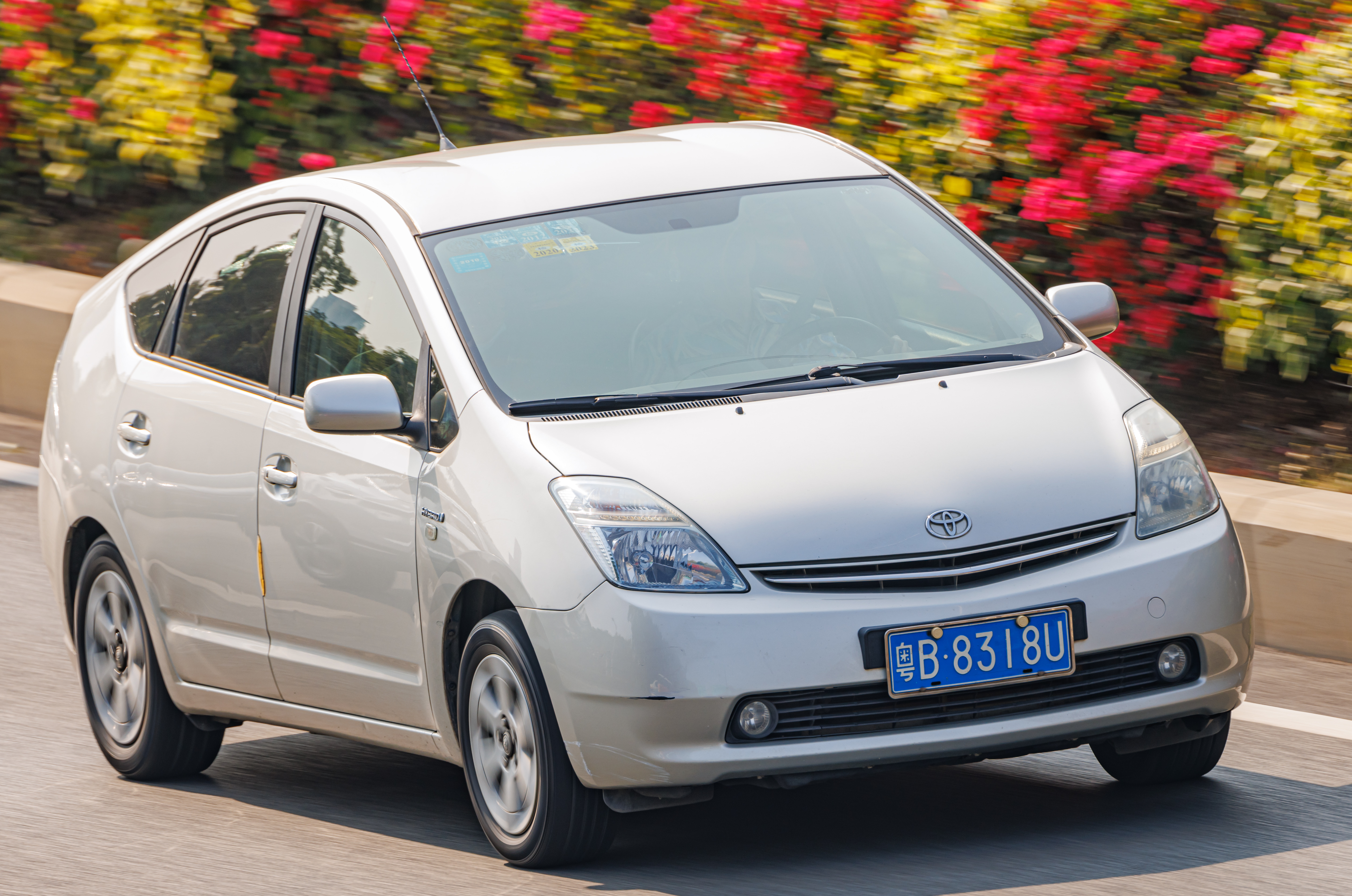
2005–2009
丰田普锐斯XW20
Toyota Prius XW20

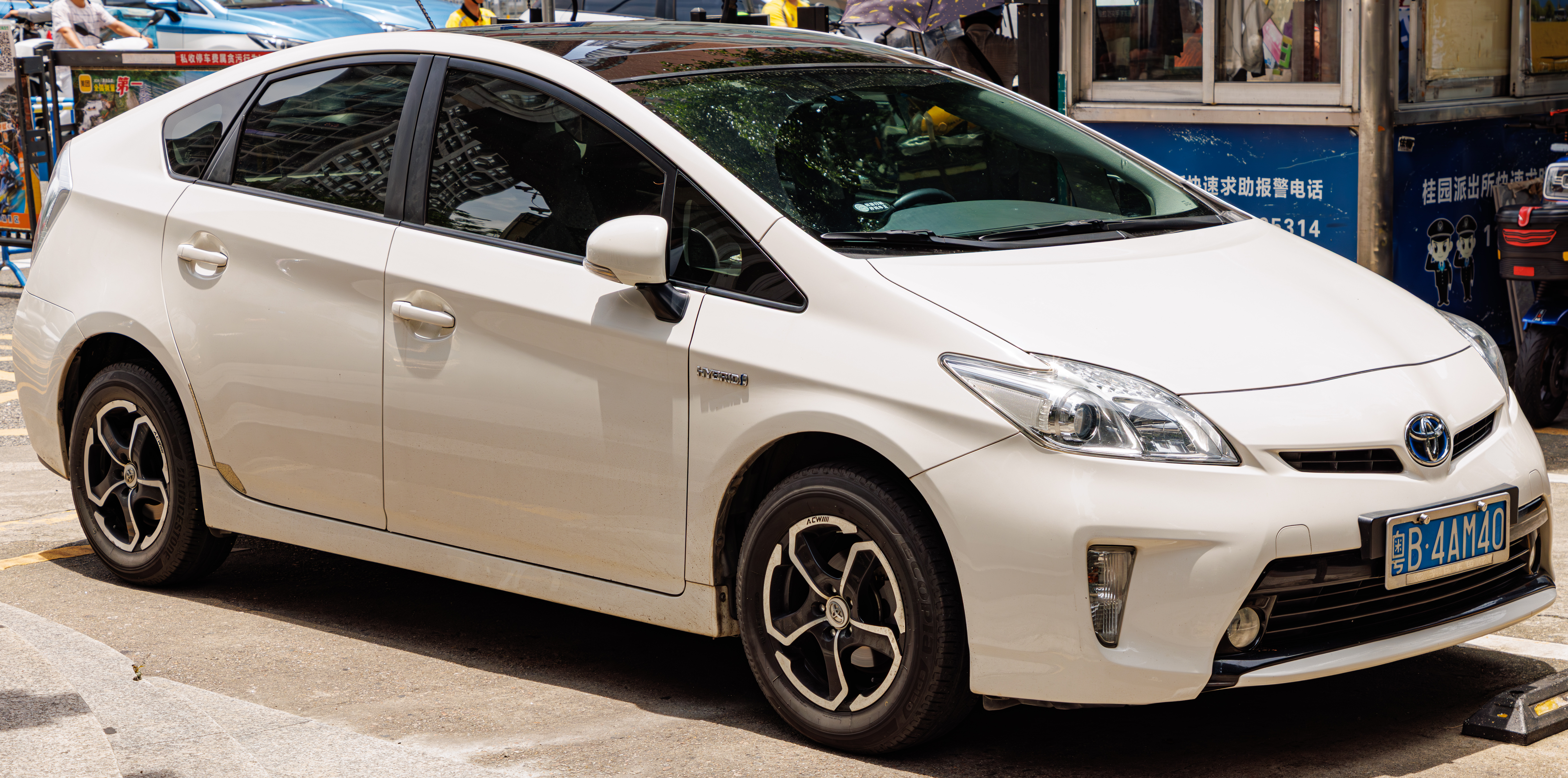
2011–2015
丰田普锐斯XW30
Toyota Prius XW30

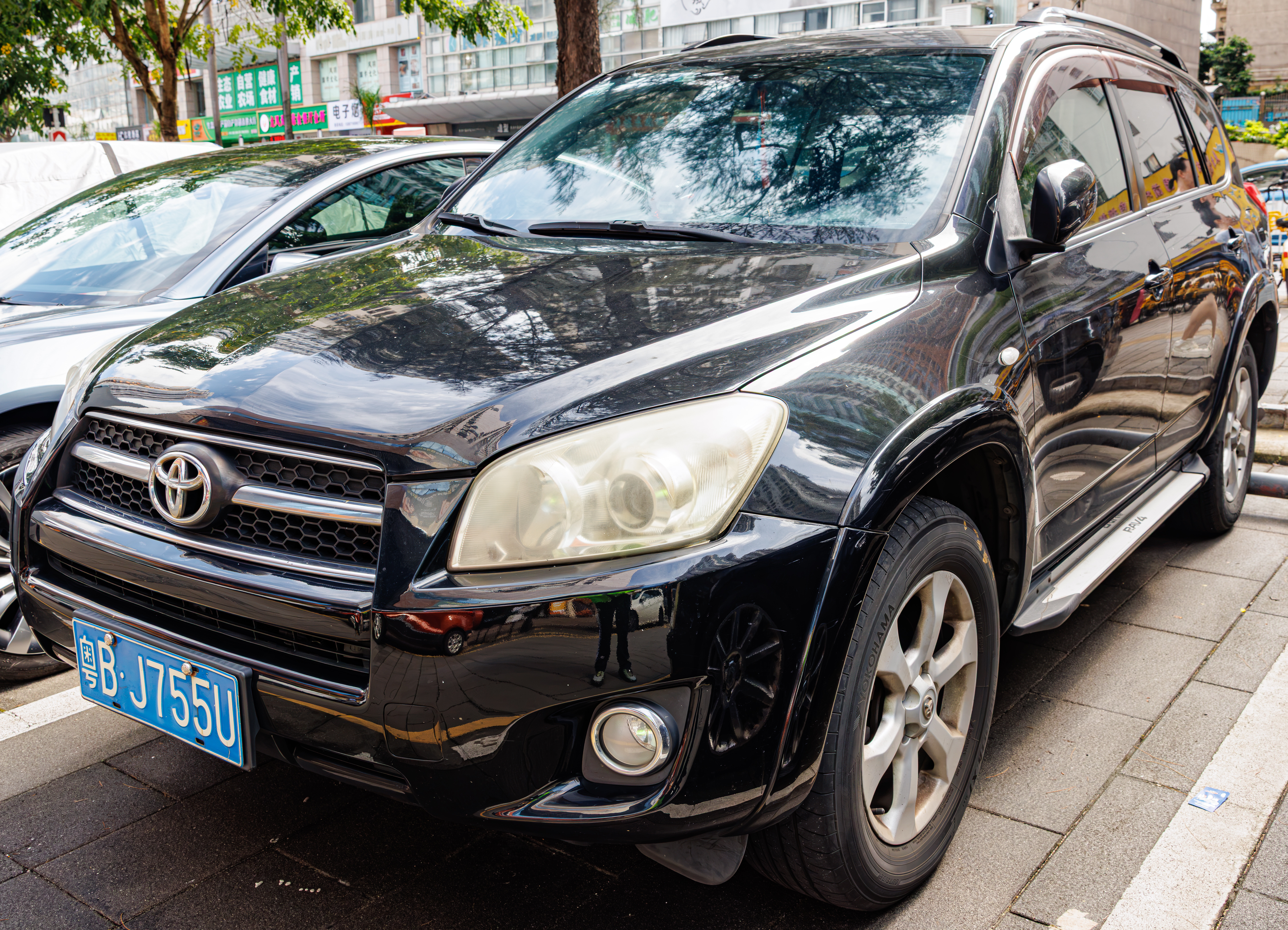
2009–2013
丰田RAV4 XA30
Toyota RAV4 XA30

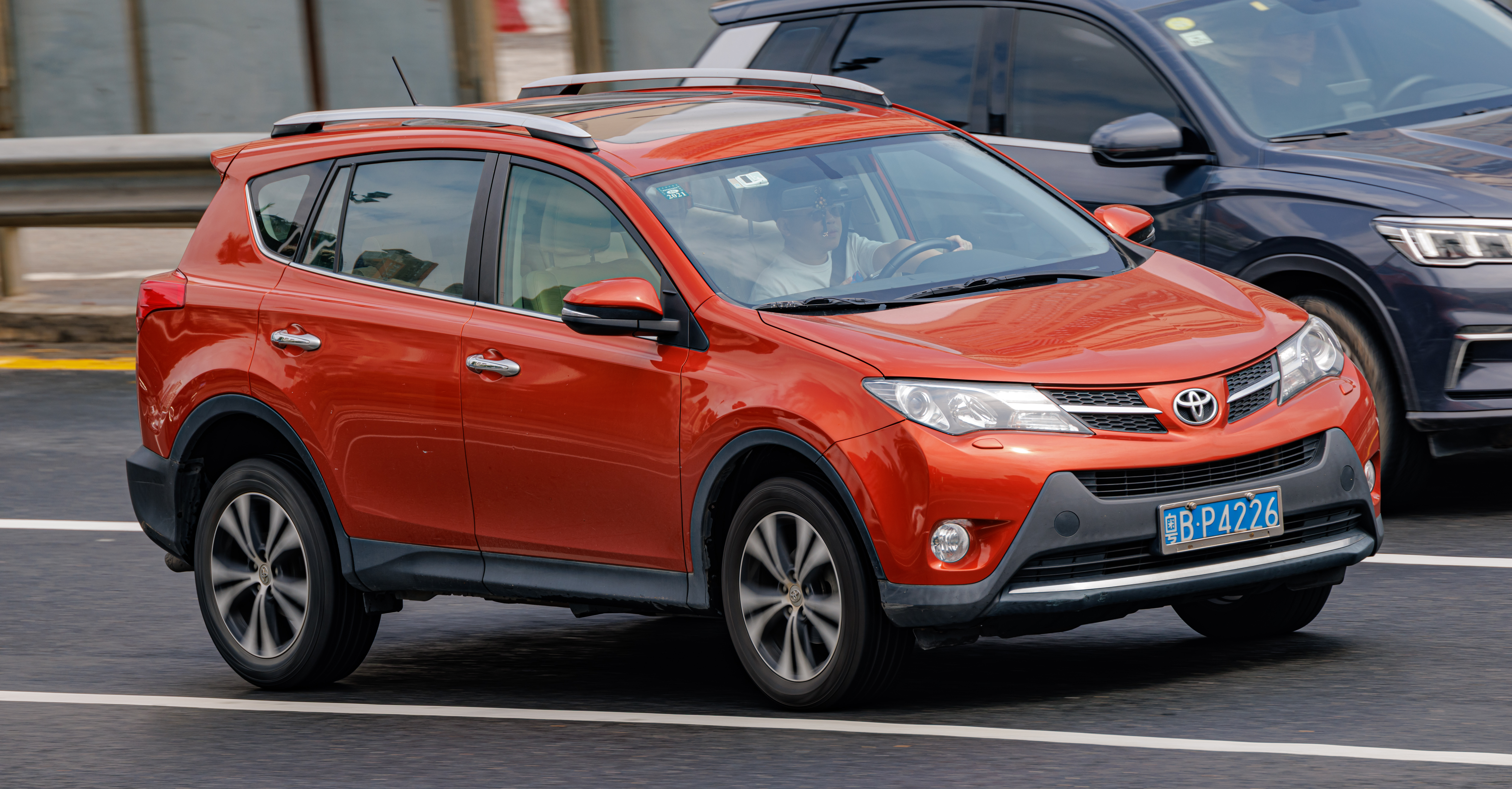
2013–2016
丰田RAV4 XA40
Toyota RAV4 XA40

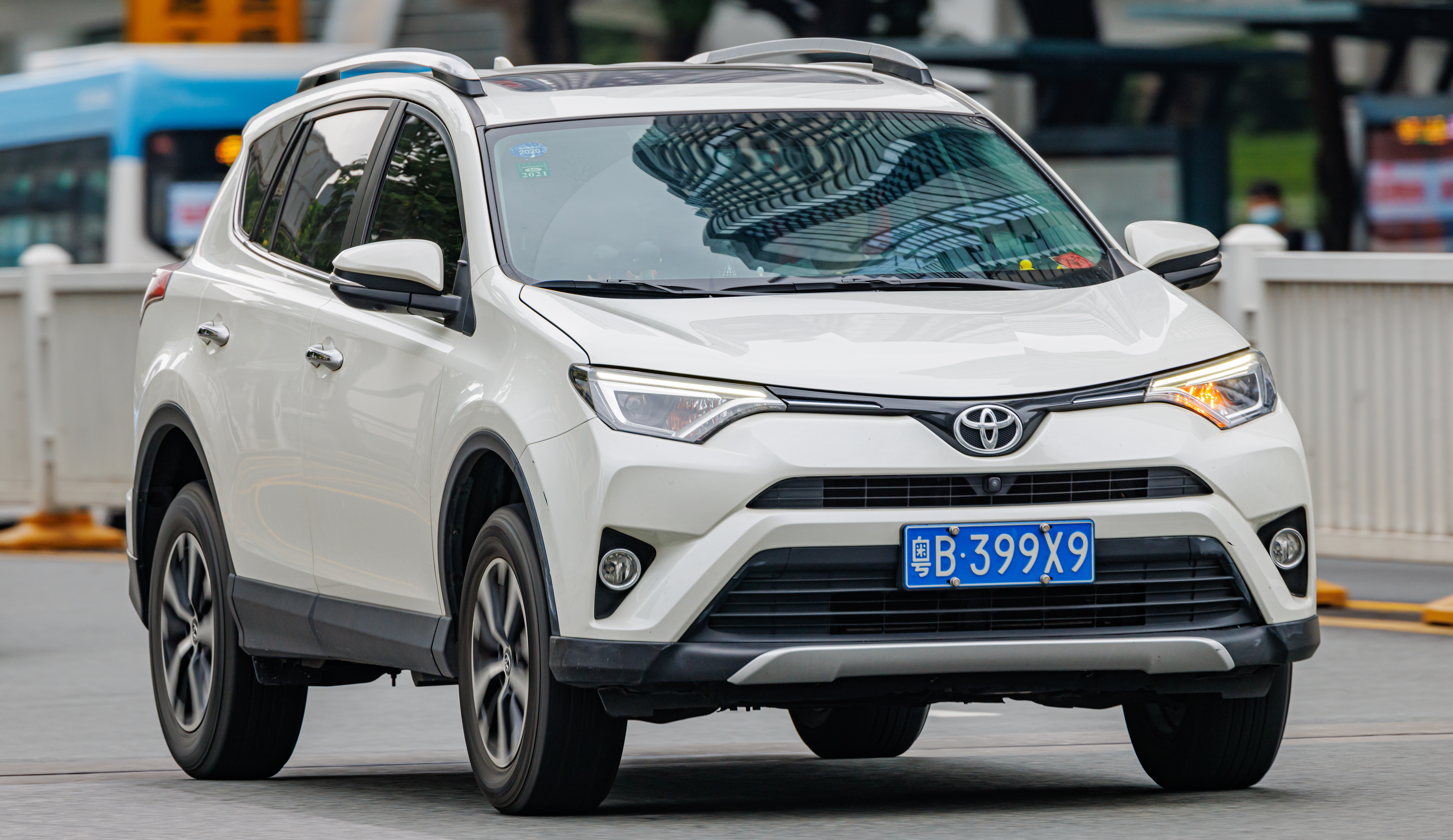
2016–2019
丰田RAV4荣放XA40
Toyota RAV4 XA40

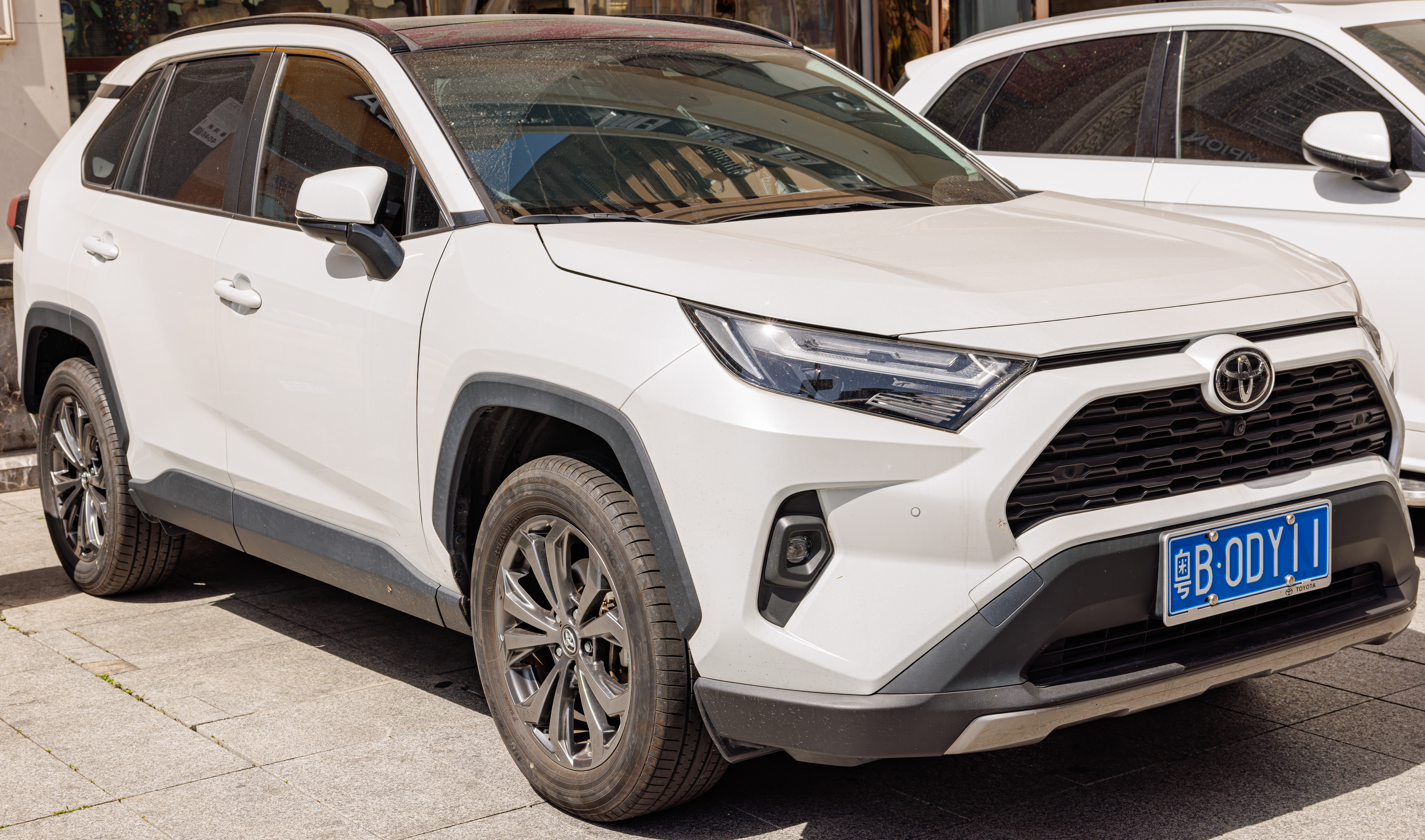
2019–2025
丰田RAV4荣放XA50
Toyota RAV4 XA50

==== GAC Toyota ====
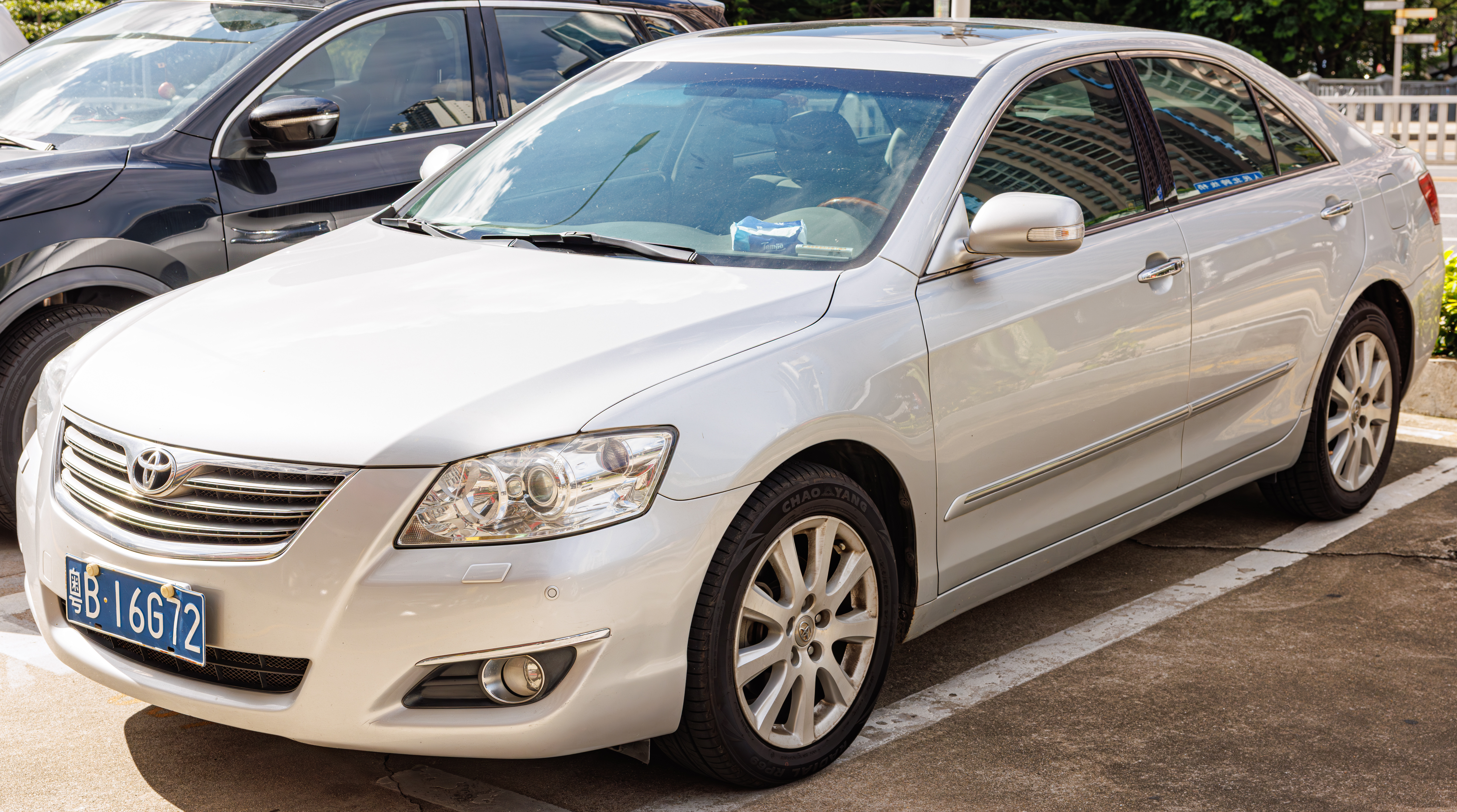
2006–2009
丰田凯美瑞XV40
Toyota Camry XV40

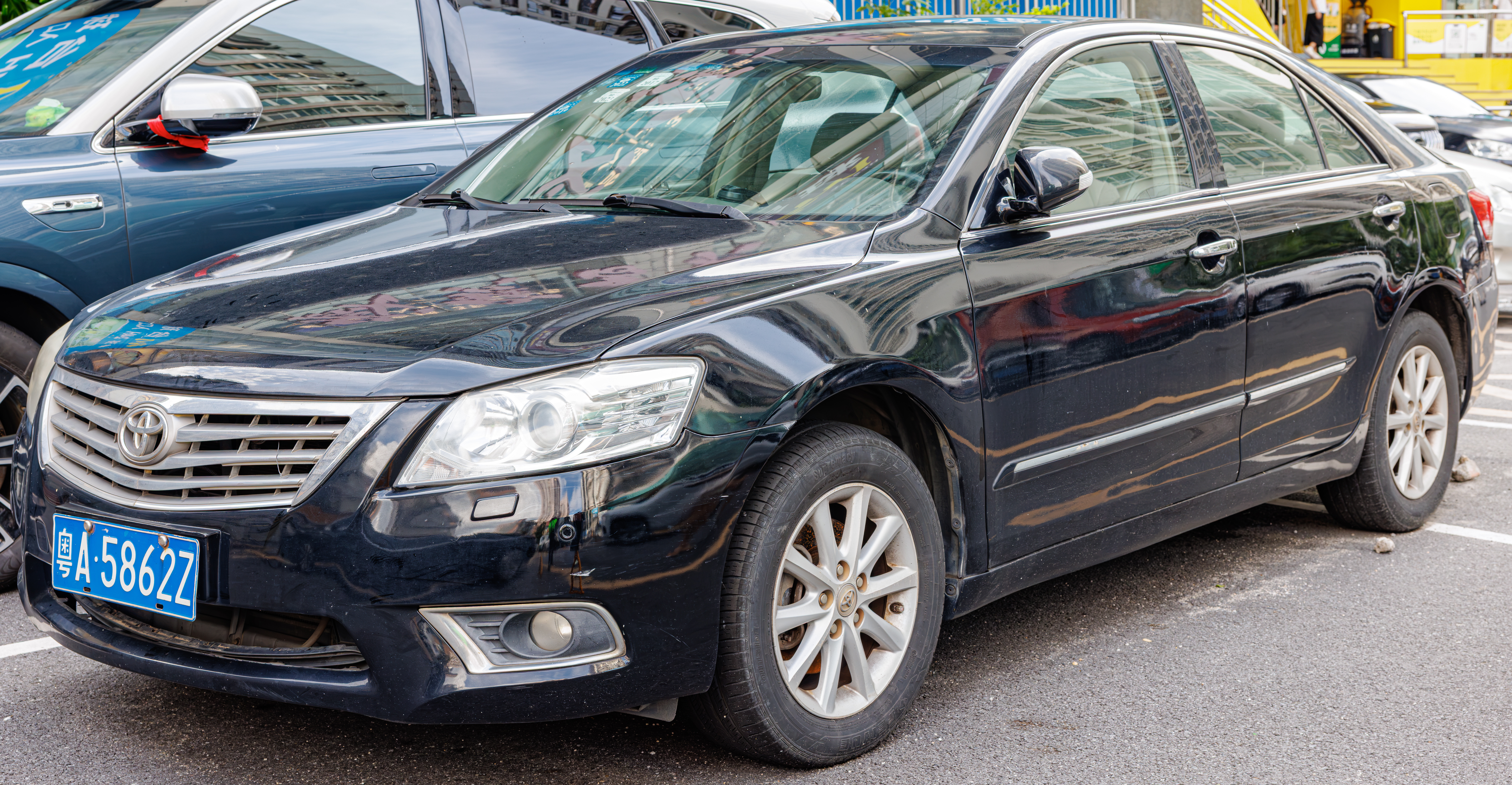
2009–2013
丰田凯美瑞XV40
Toyota Camry XV40

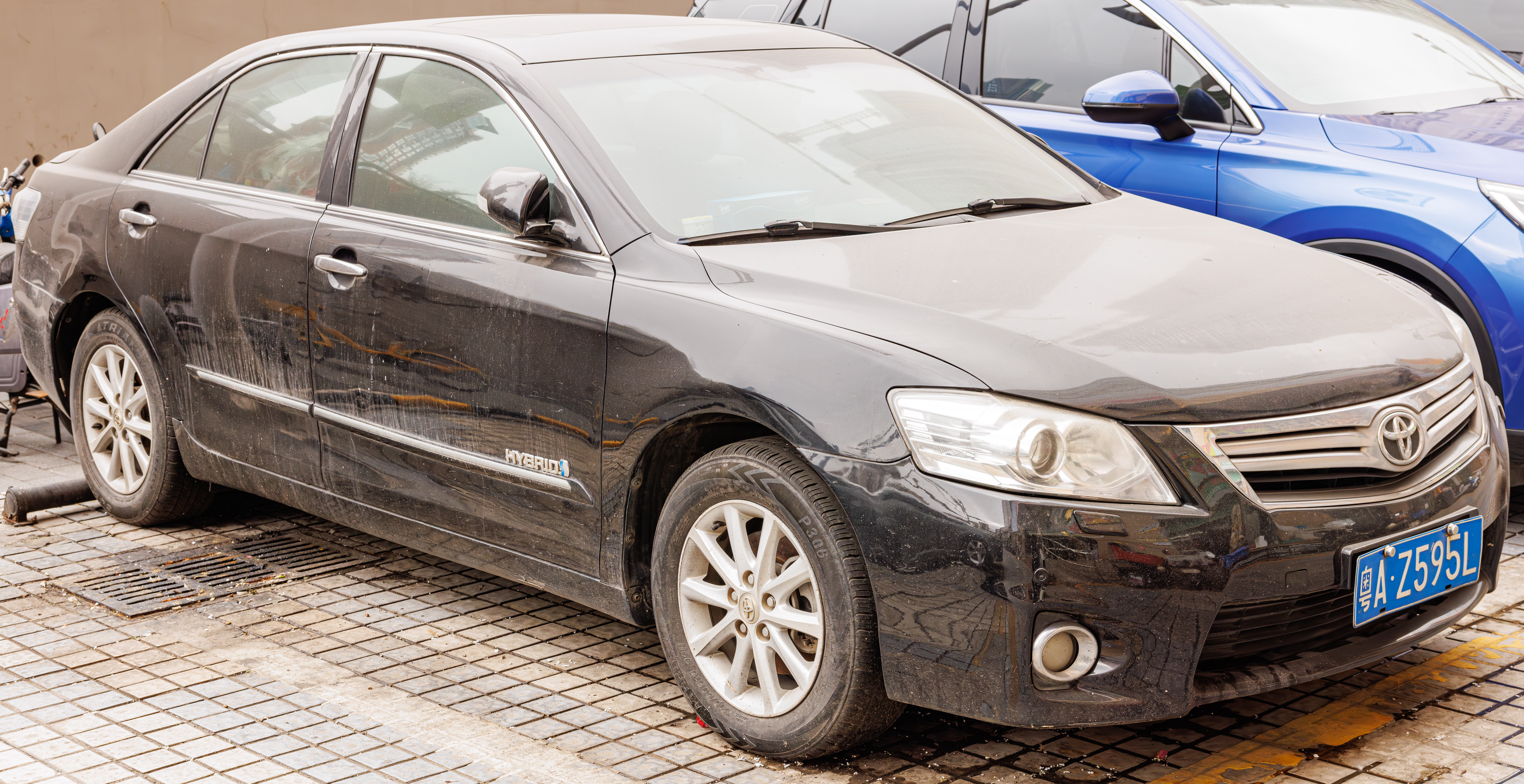
2010–2011
丰田凯美瑞混合动力XV40
Toyota Camry Hybrid XV40

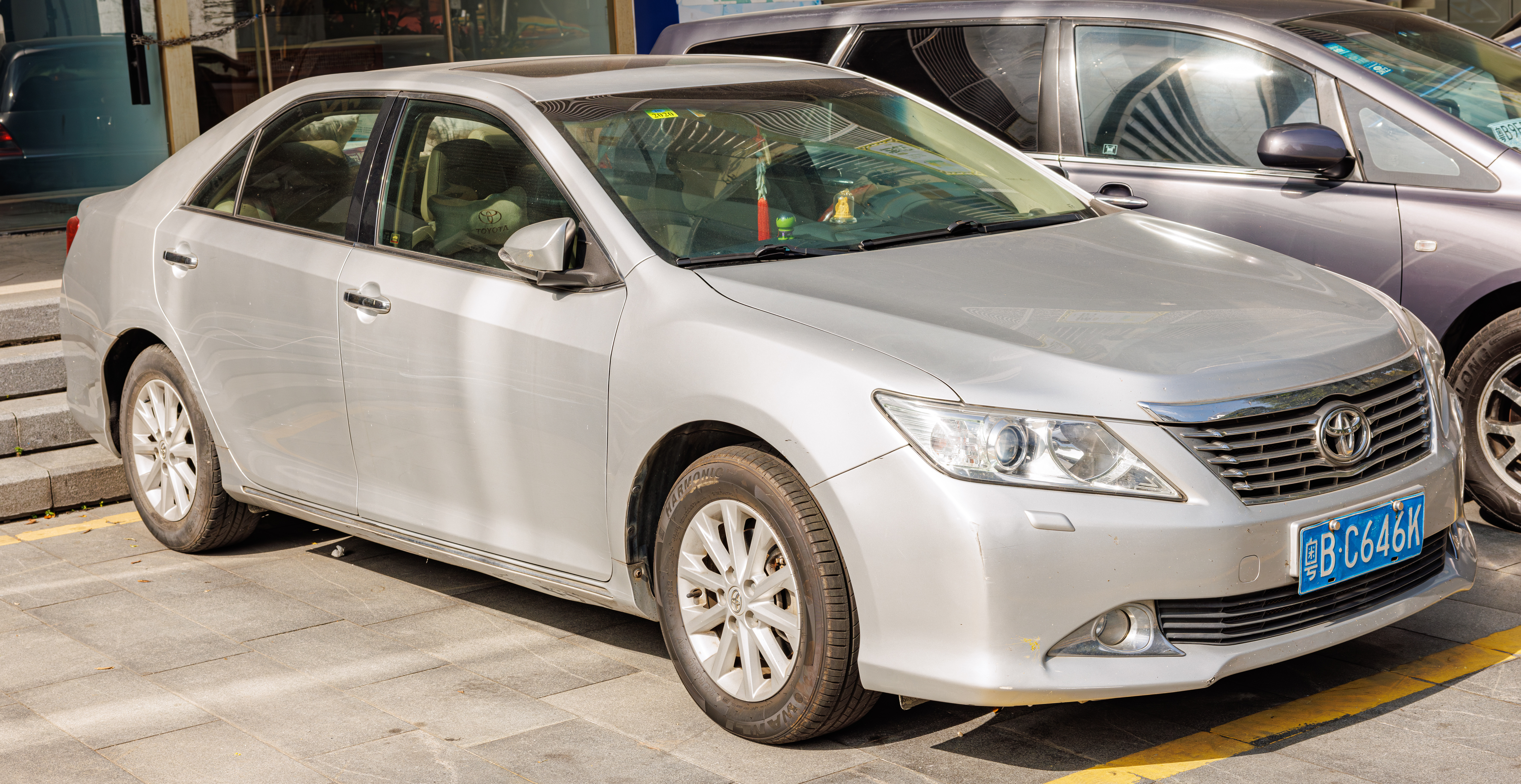
2011–2014
丰田凯美瑞XV50
Toyota Camry XV50

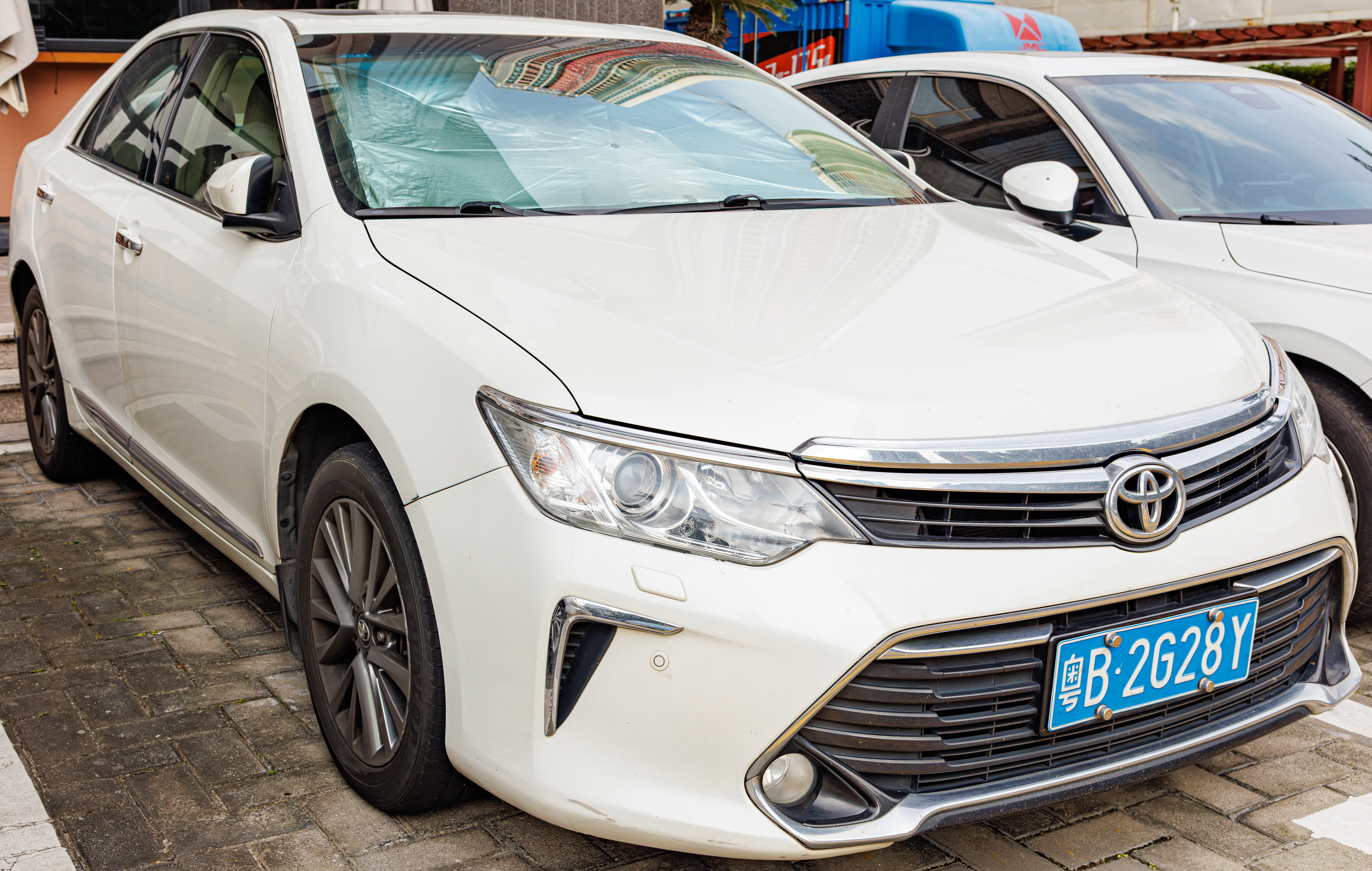
2015–2017
丰田凯美瑞XV50
Toyota Camry XV50

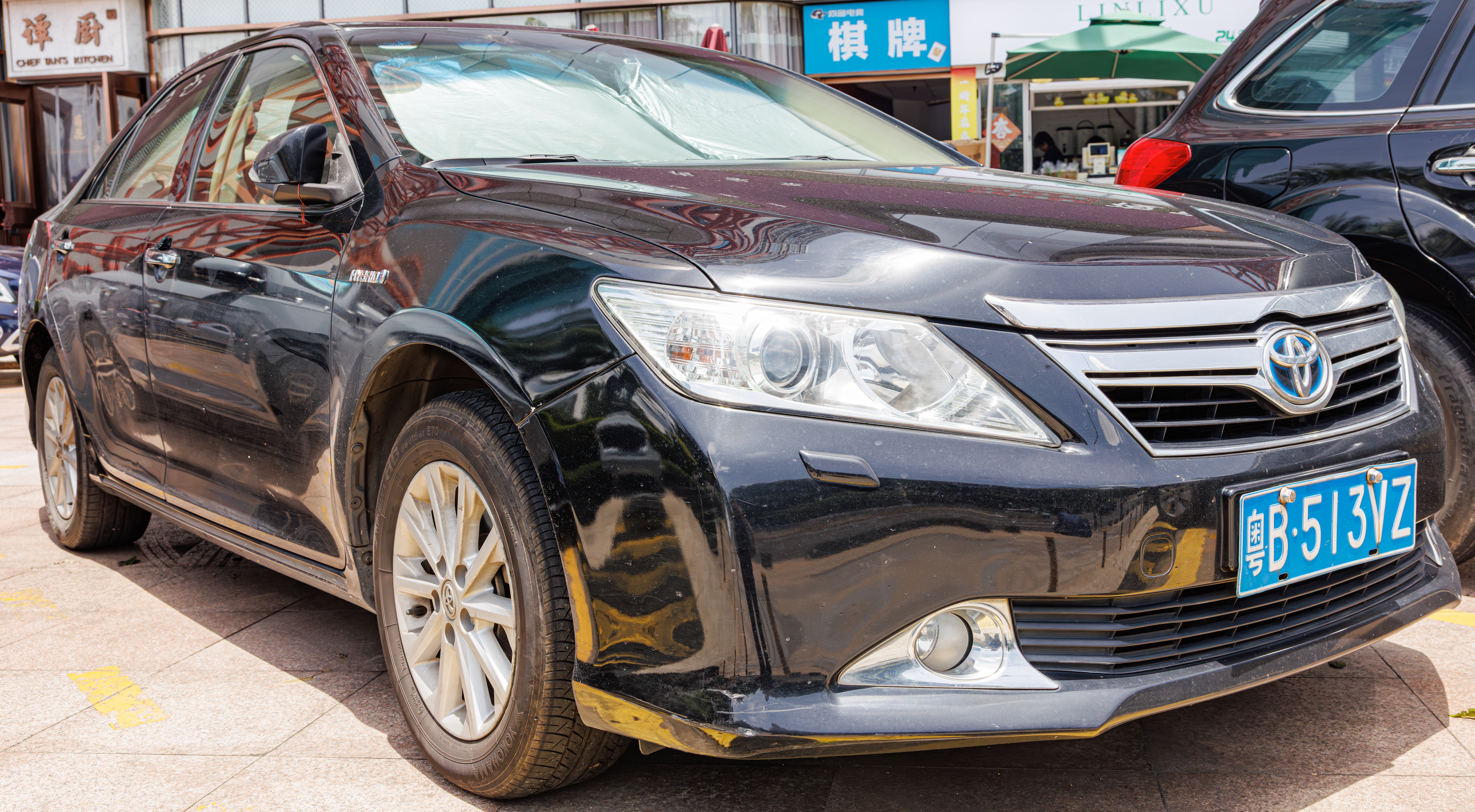
2012–2014
丰田凯美瑞尊瑞XV50
Toyota Camry Hybrid XV50

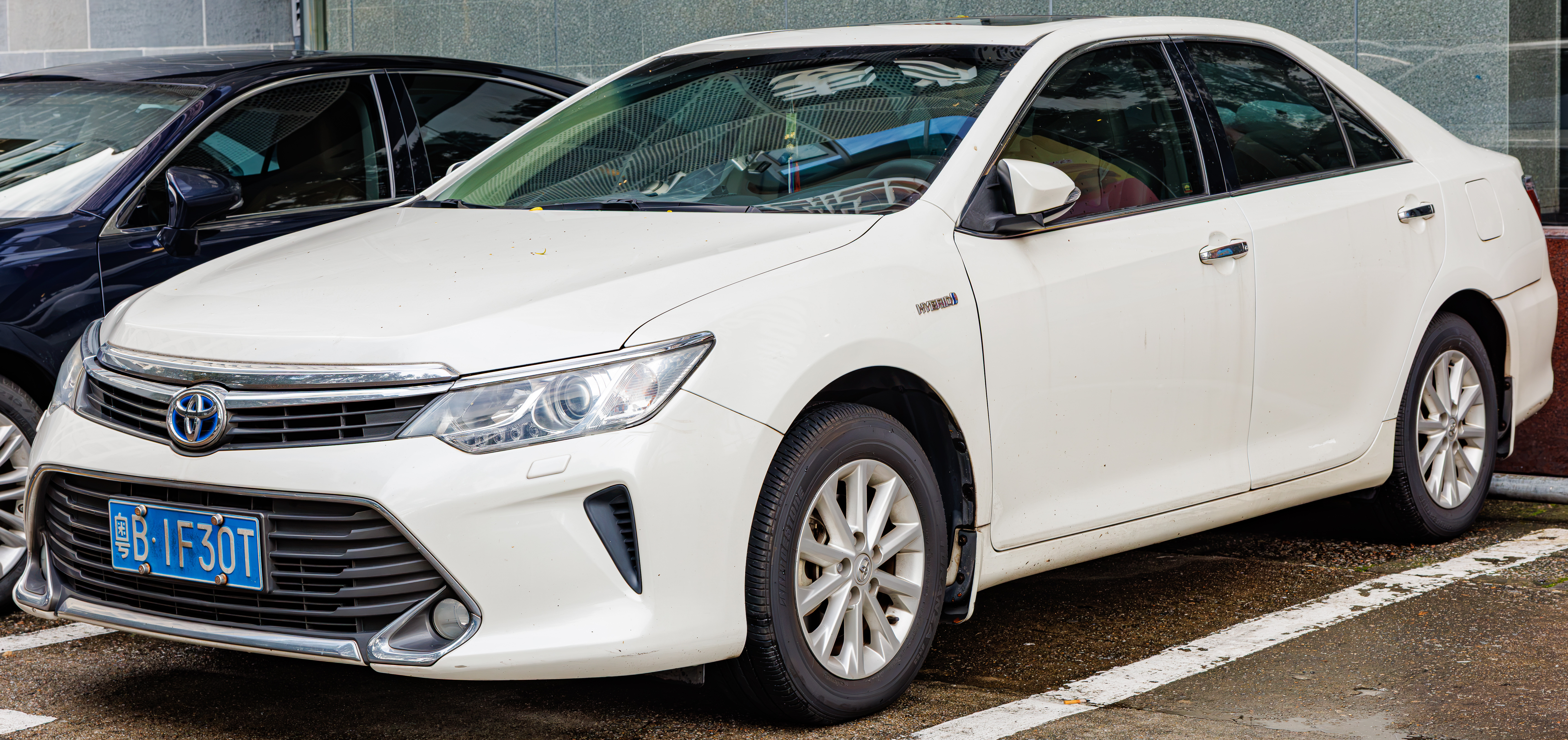
2015–2017
丰田凯美瑞尊瑞XV50
Toyota Camry Hybrid XV50

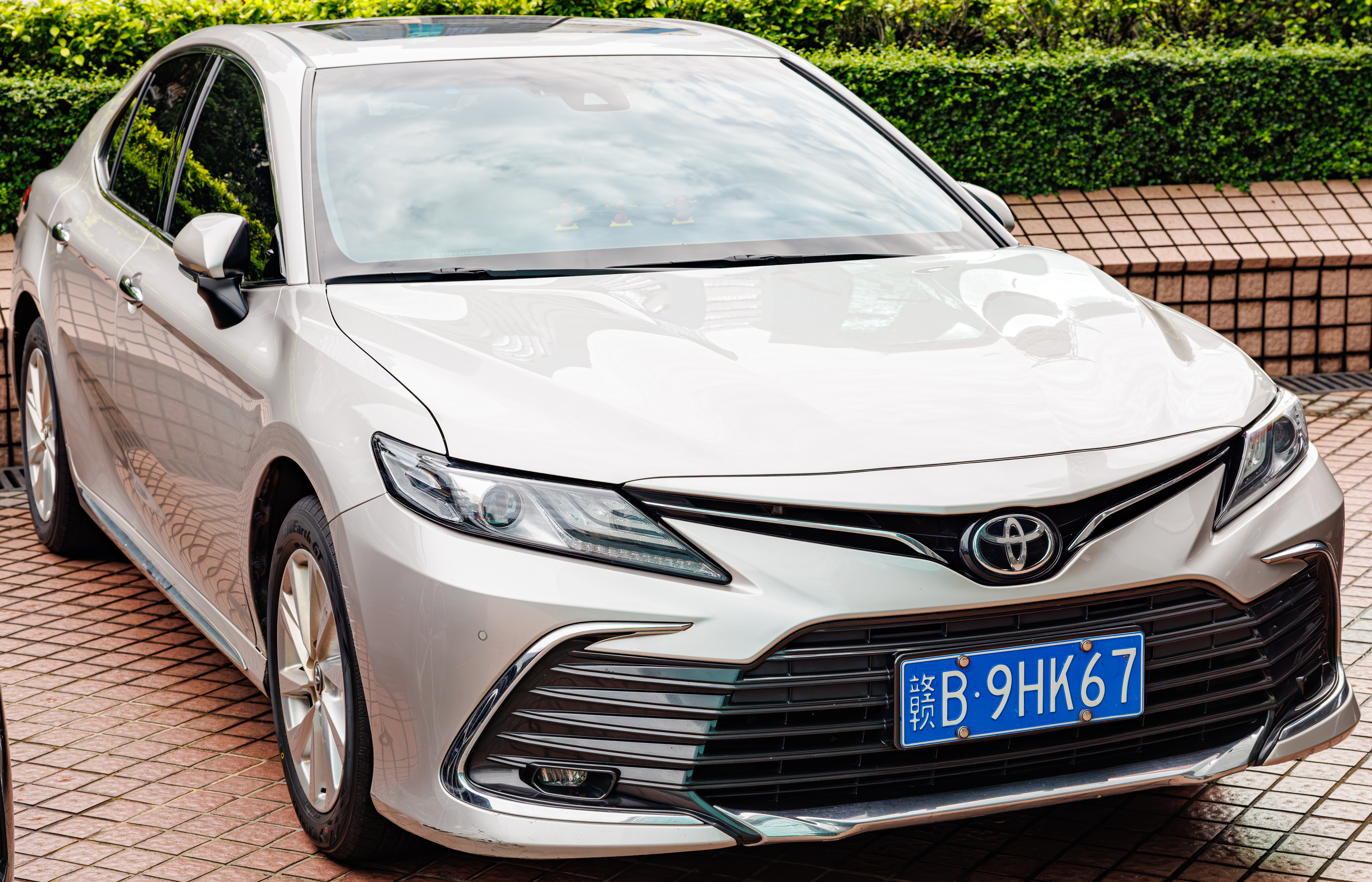
2017–2021
丰田凯美瑞XV70
Toyota Camry XV70

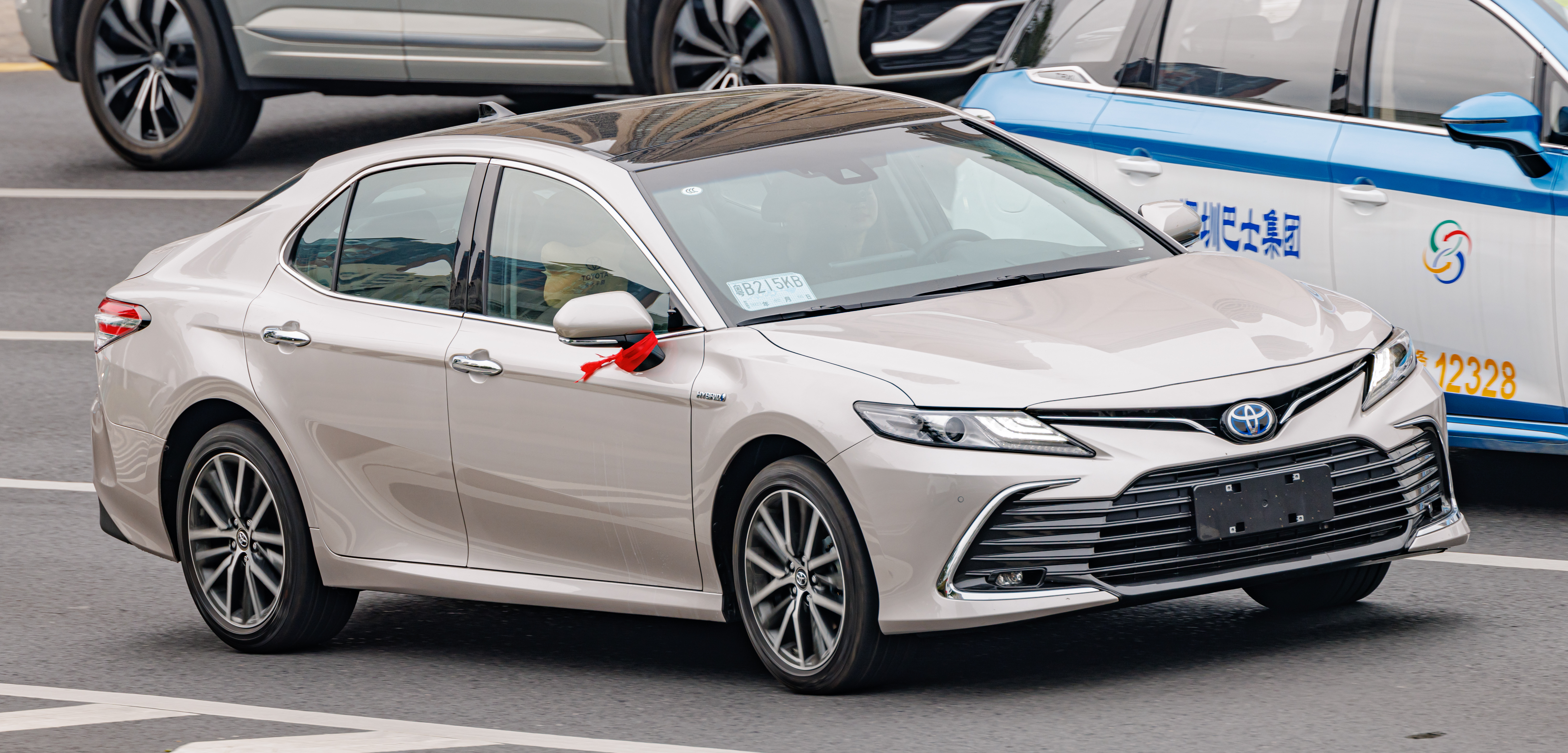
2021–2023
丰田凯美瑞XV70
Toyota Camry XV70

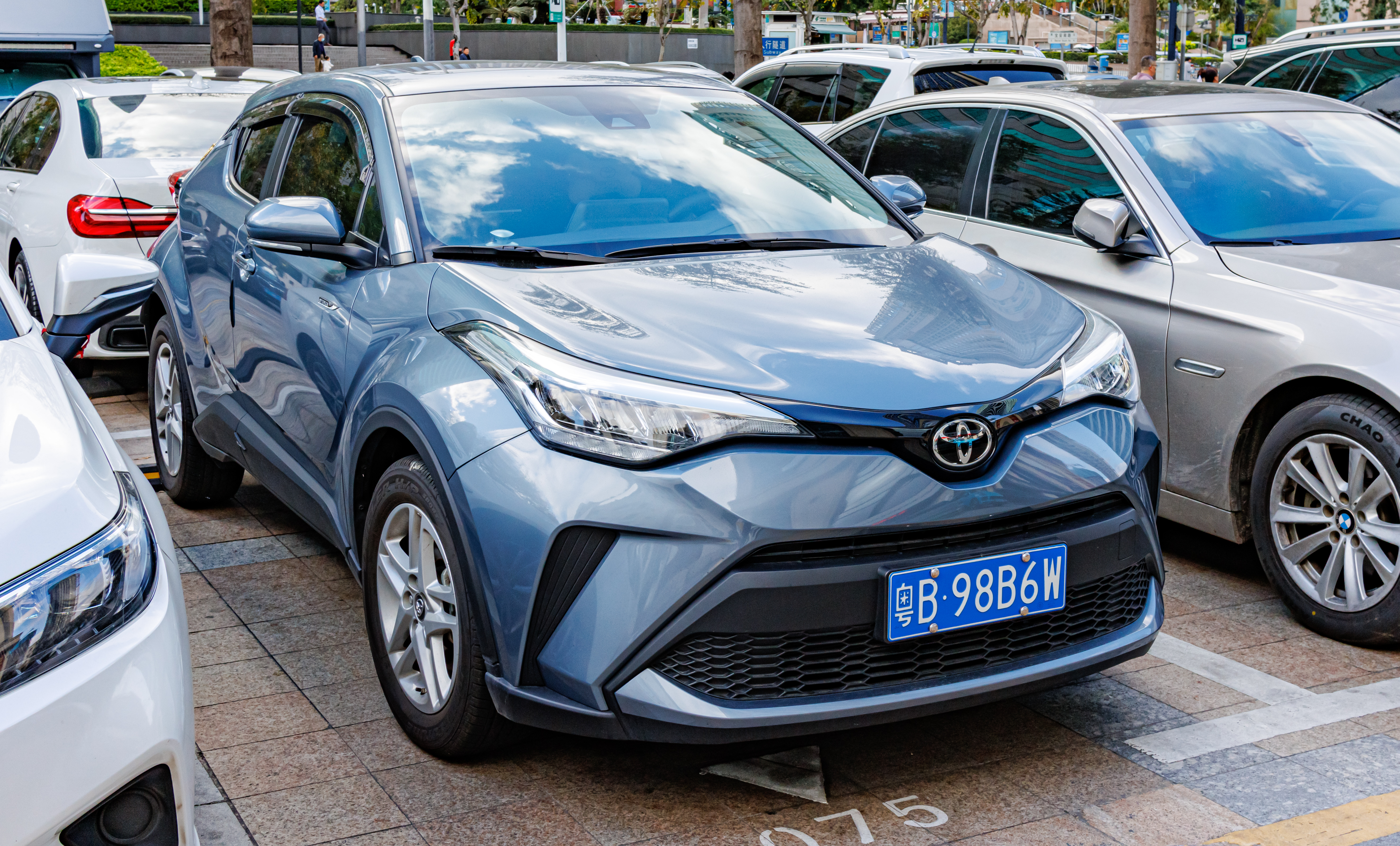
2018–2025
丰田C-HR
Toyota C-HR

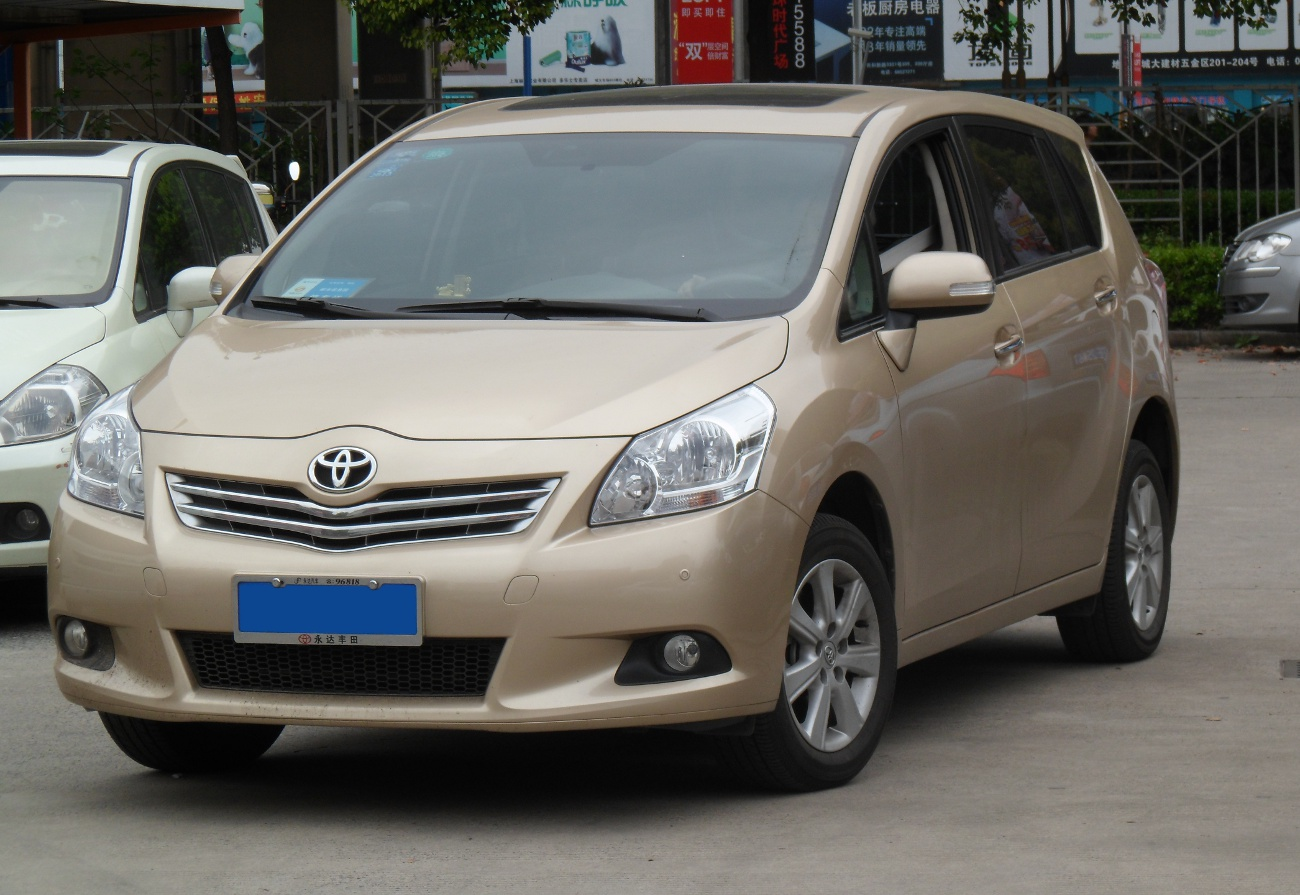
2011–2018
丰田逸致
Toyota E'Z

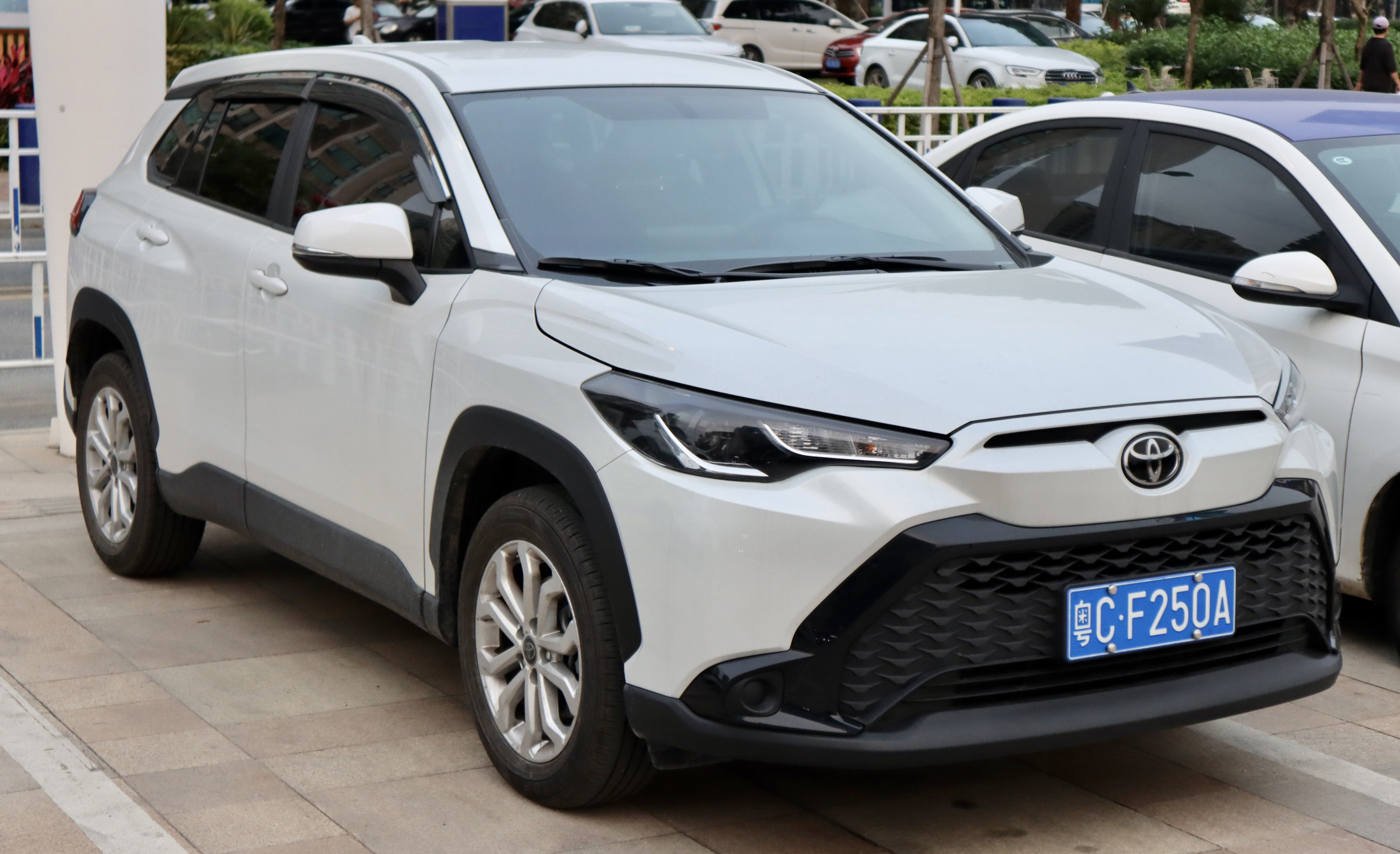
2021–2025
丰田锋兰达
Toyota Frontlander

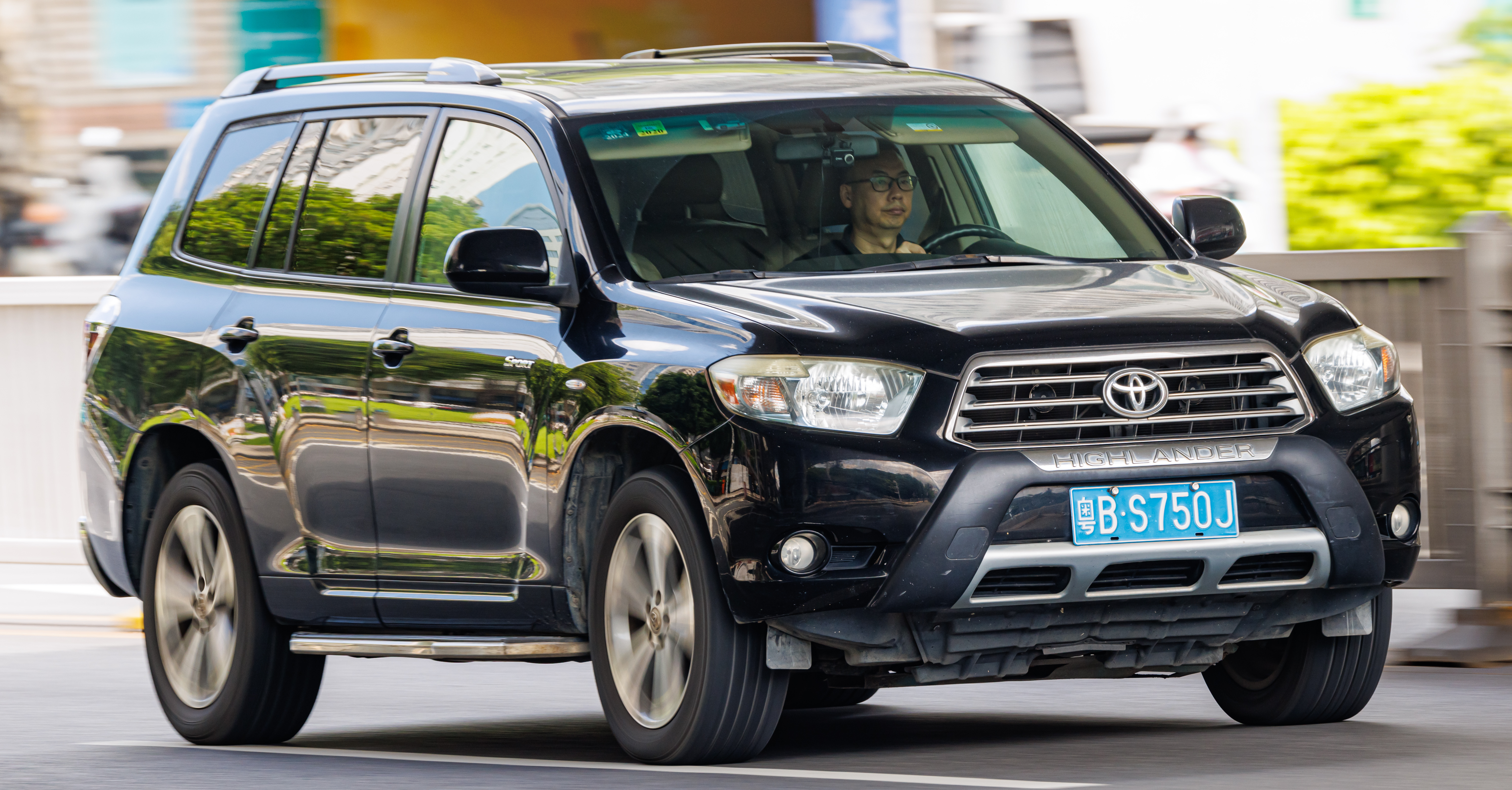
2009–2012
丰田汉兰达XU40
Toyota Highlander XU40

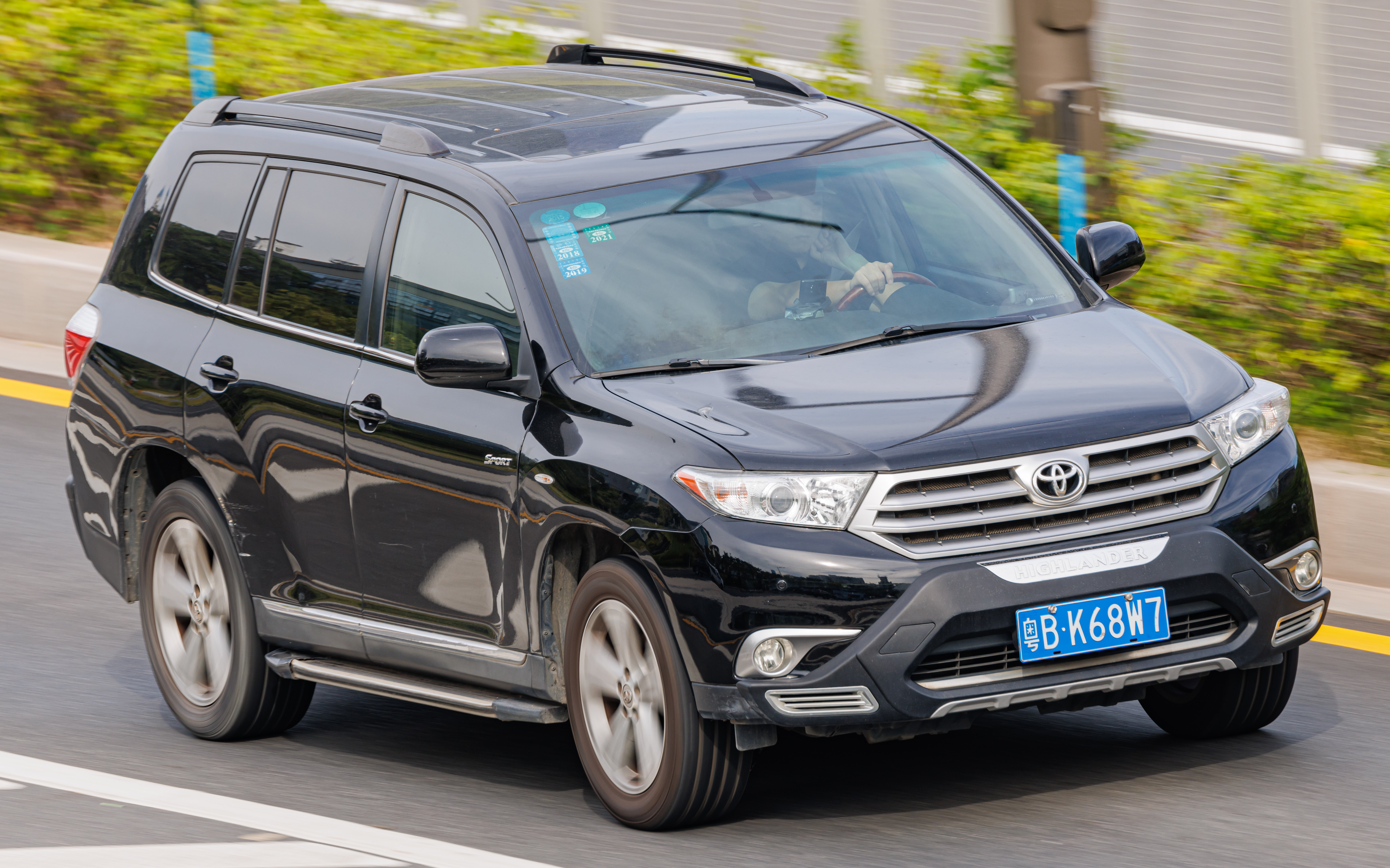
2012–2015
丰田汉兰达XU40
Toyota Highlander XU40

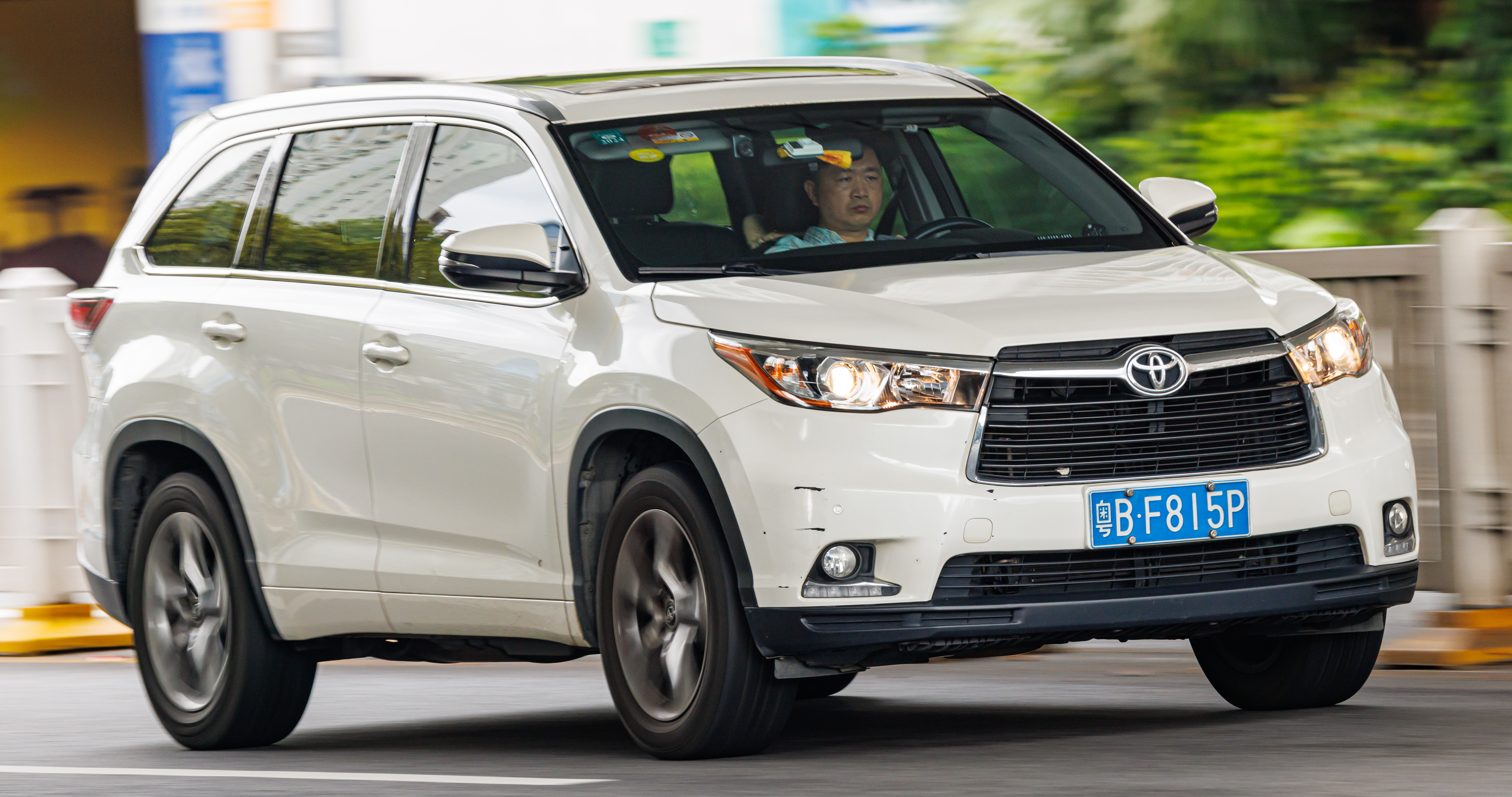
2015–2018
丰田汉兰达XU50
Toyota Highlander XU50

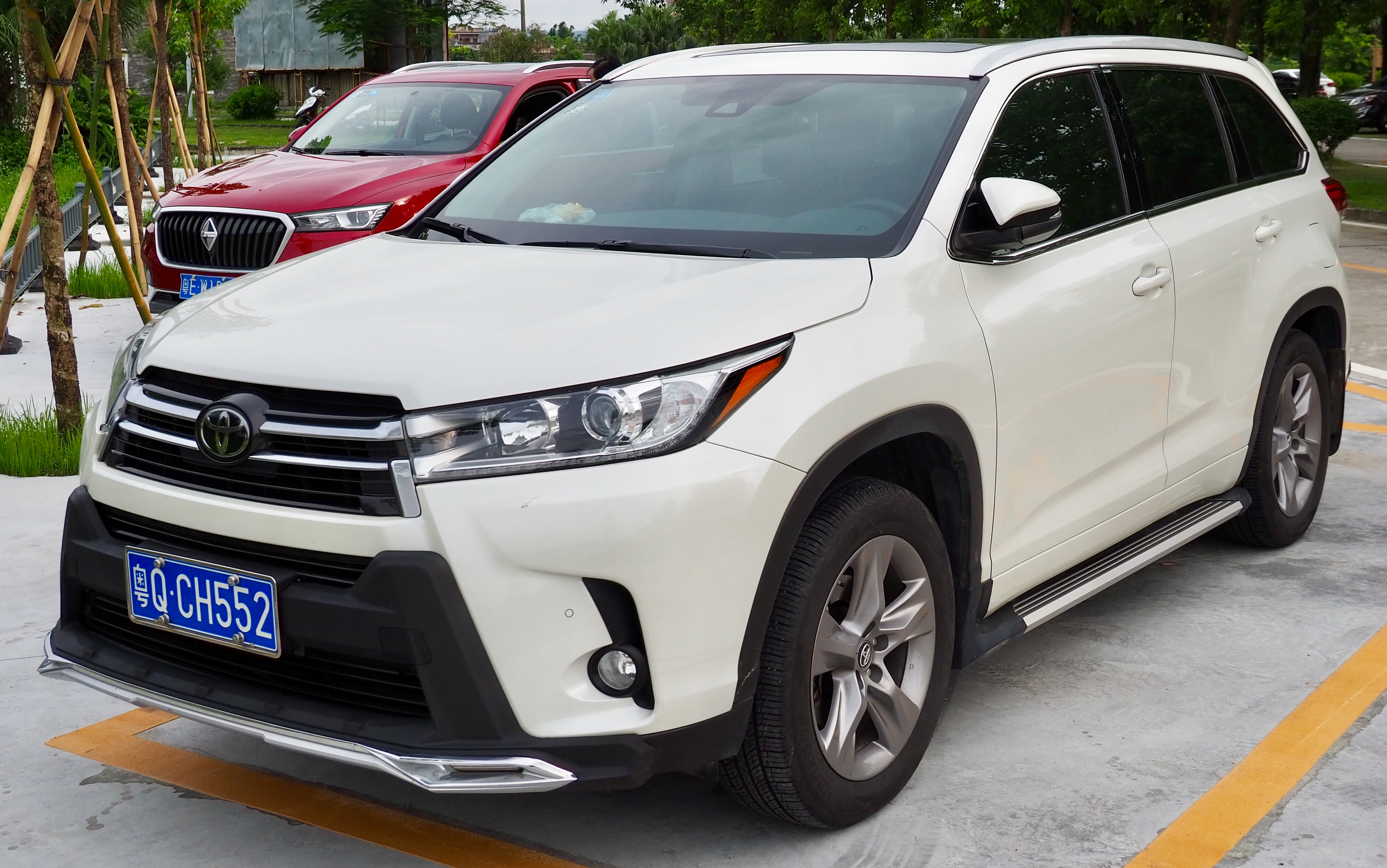
2018–2021
丰田汉兰达XU50
Toyota Highlander XU50

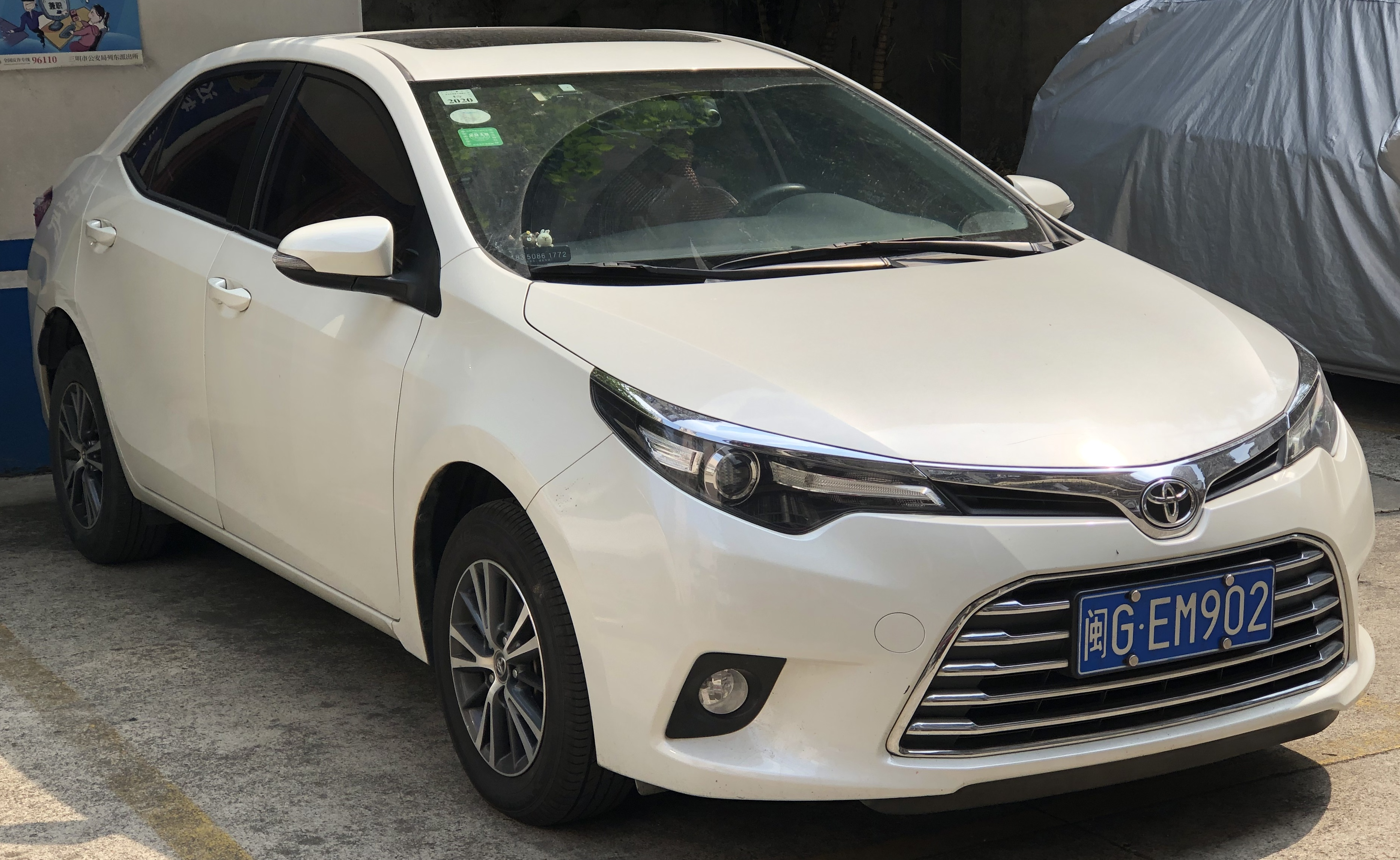
2014–2017
丰田雷凌E170
Toyota Levin E170

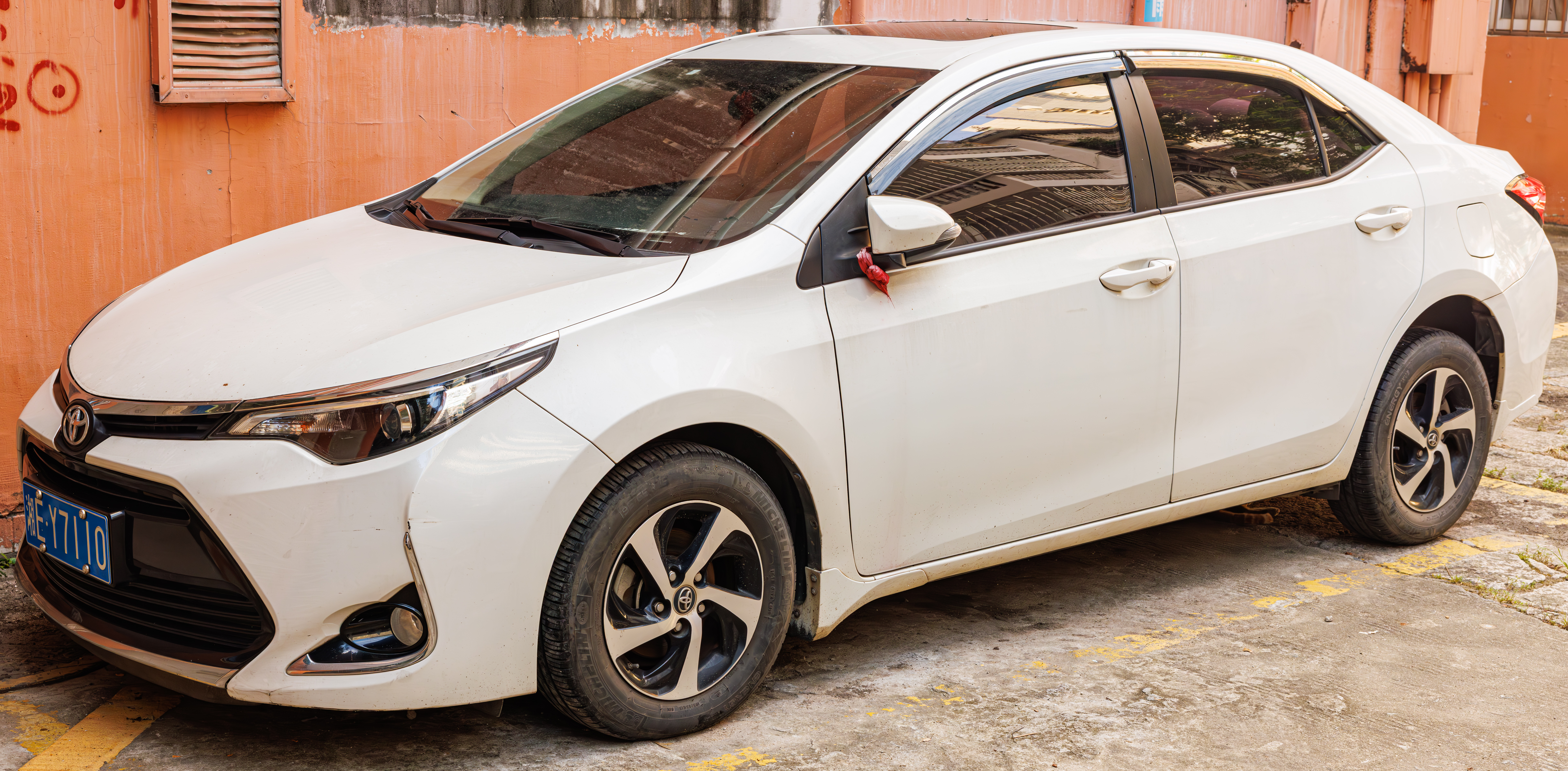
2017–2019
丰田雷凌E170
Toyota Levin E170

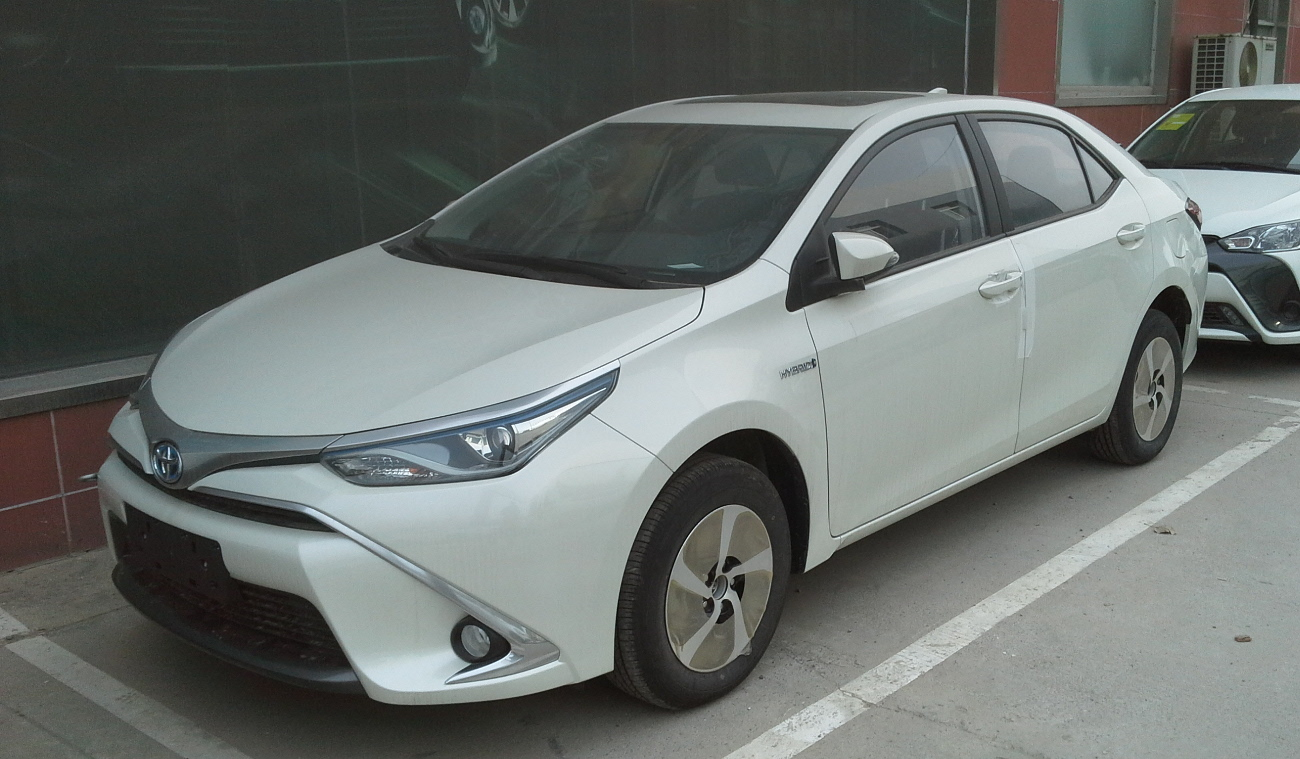
2015–2019
丰田雷凌双擎 E170
Toyota Levin Hybrid E170

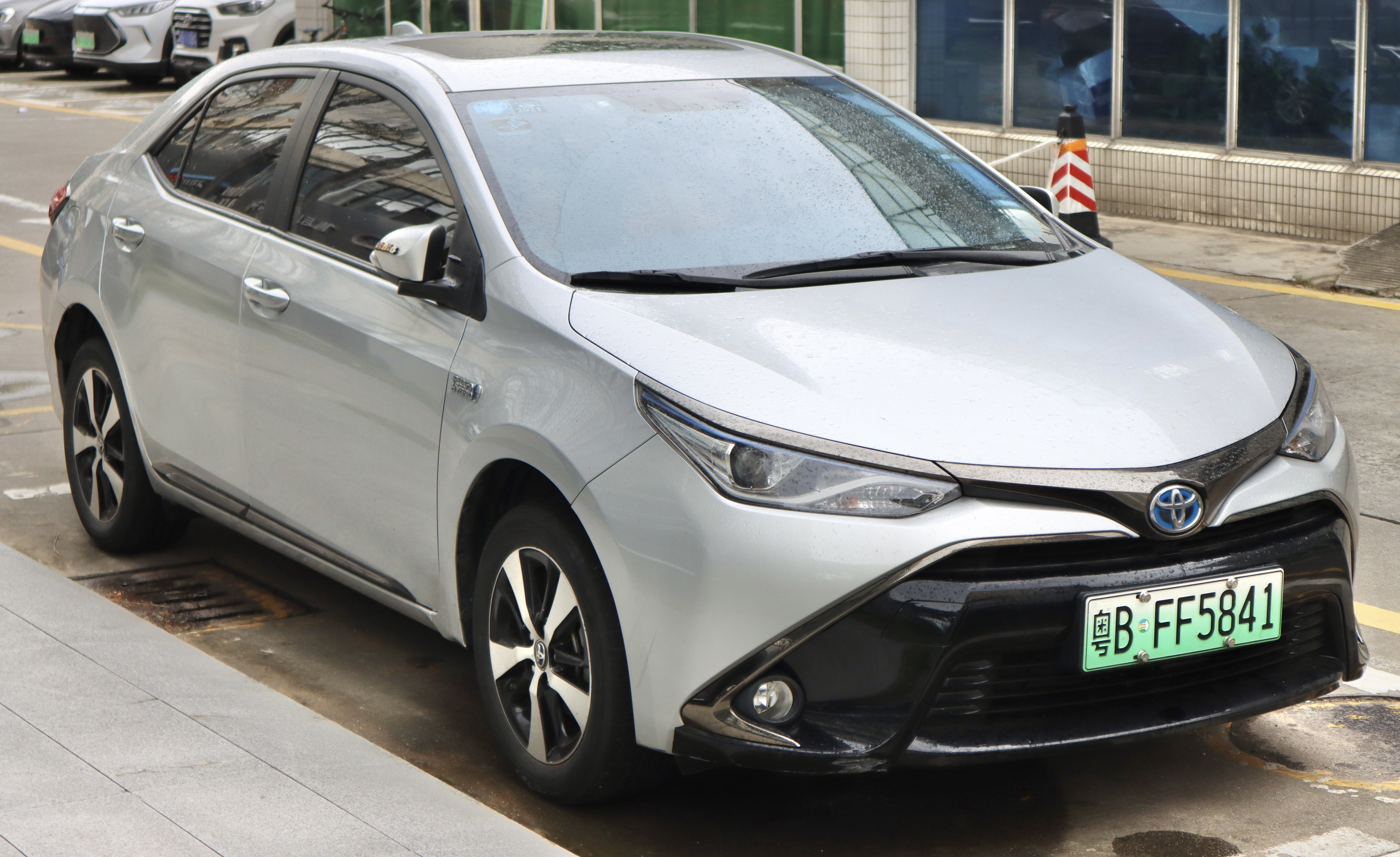
2018–2024
丰田雷凌双擎E+ E170
Toyota Levin Plug-in Hybrid E170

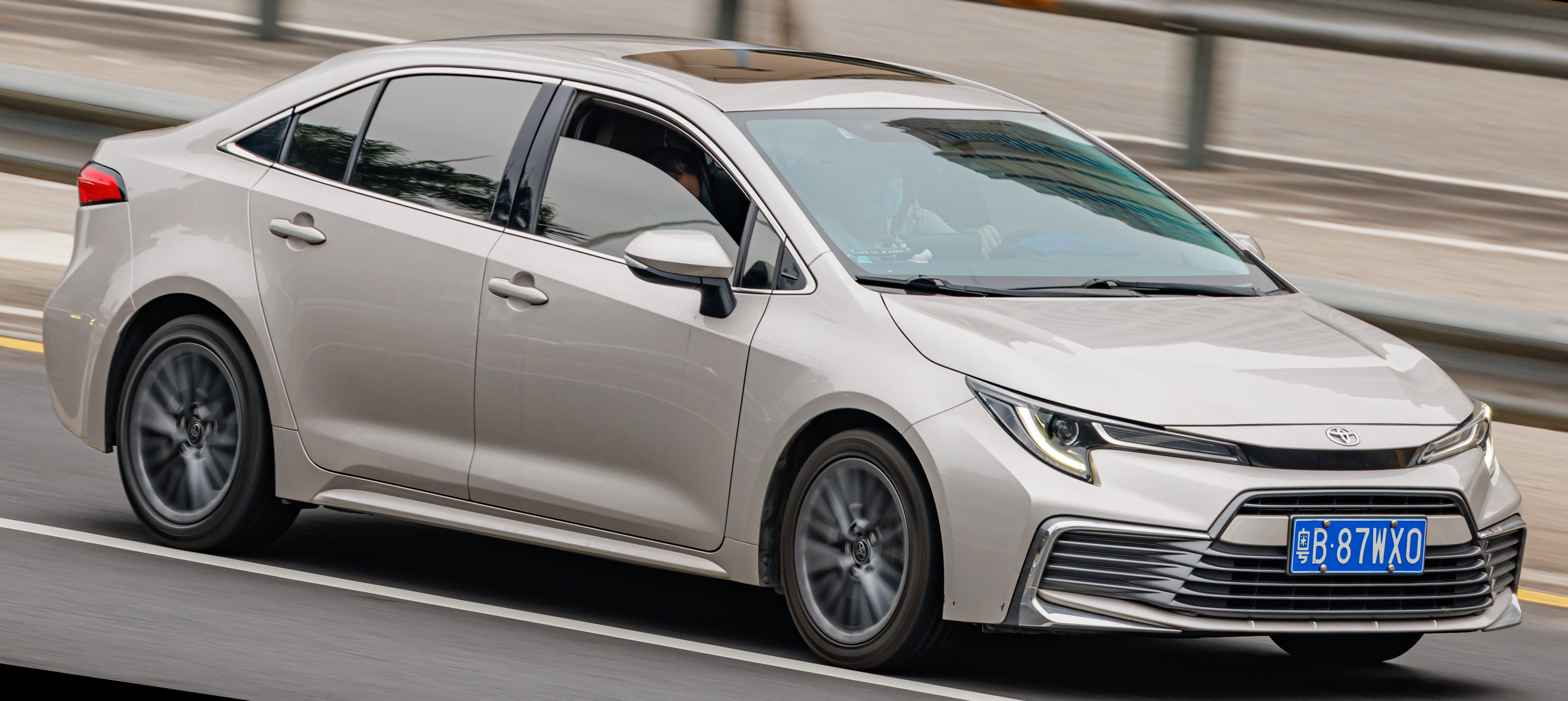
2021–2025
丰田凌尚E210
Toyota Levin GT E210

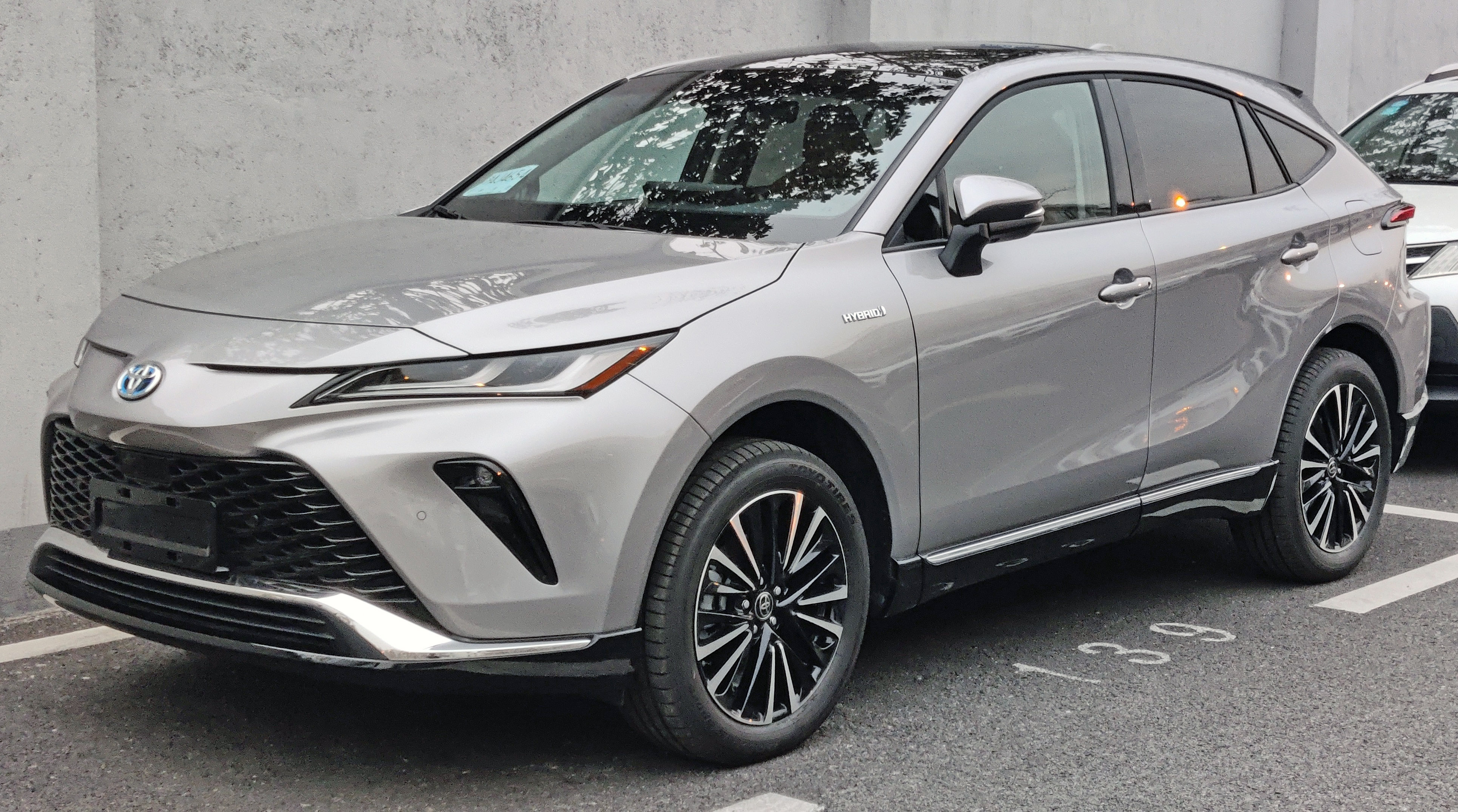
2021–2026
丰田威飒XU80
Toyota Venza XU80

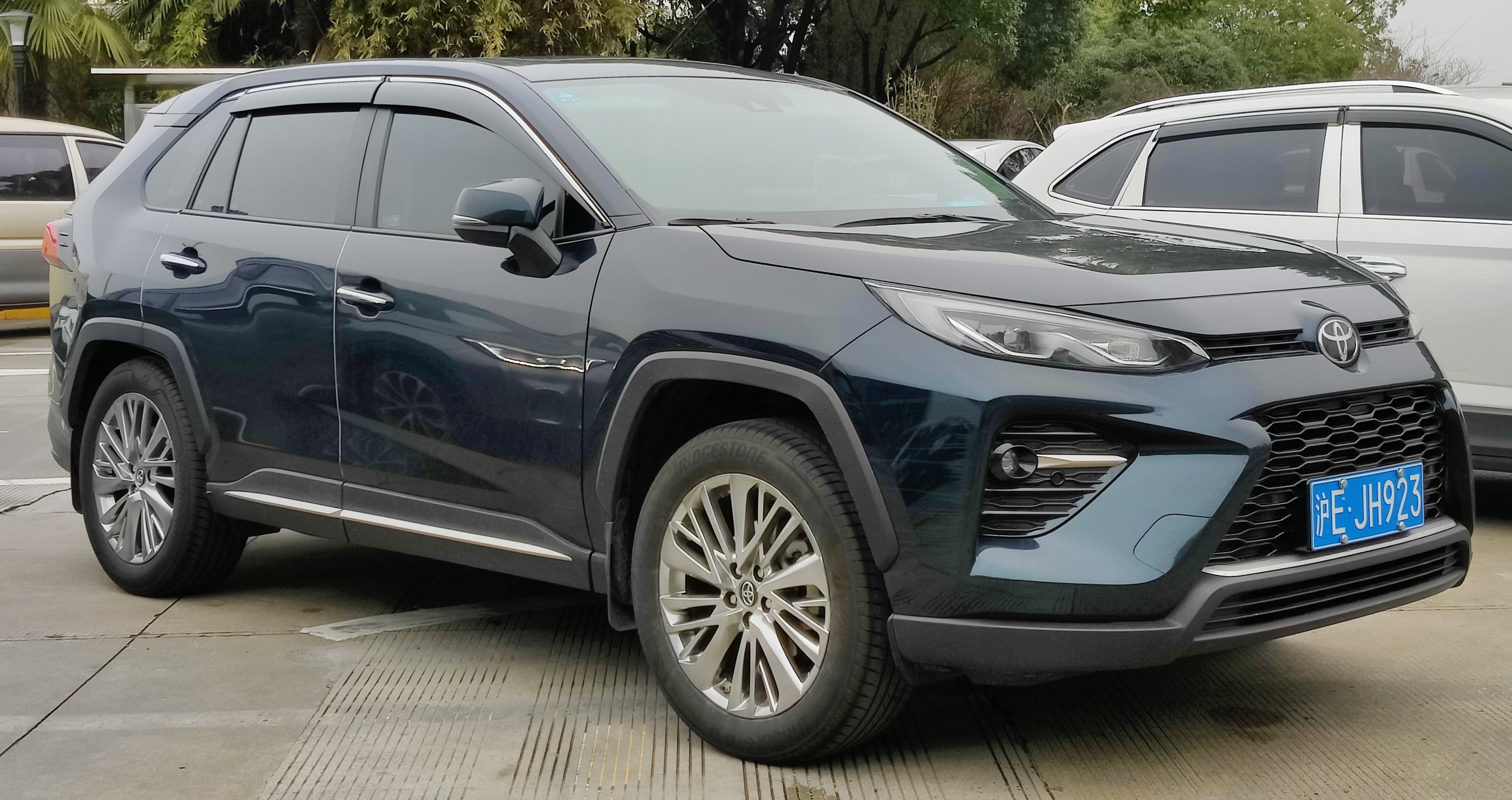
2019–2025
丰田威兰达XA50
Toyota Wildlander XA50

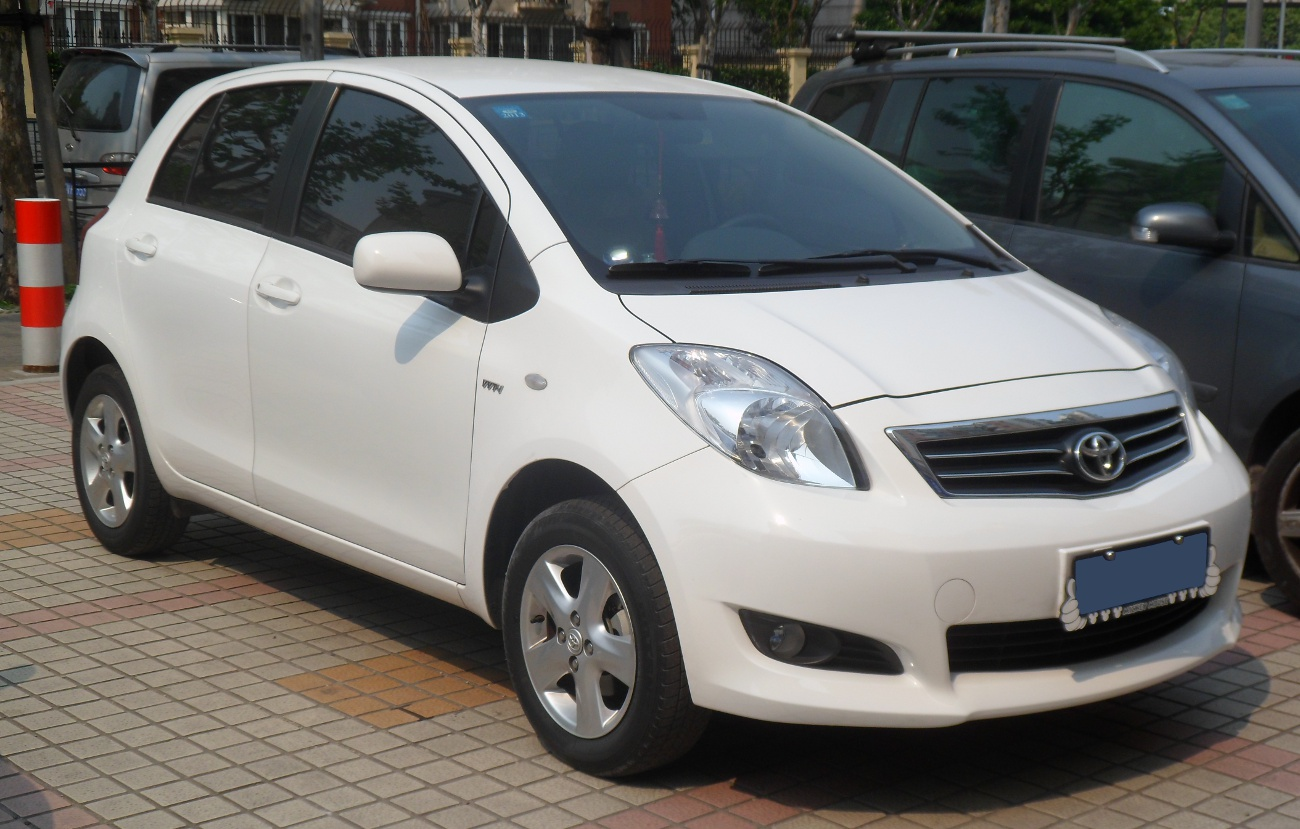
2008–2013
丰田雅力士XP90
Toyota Yaris XP90

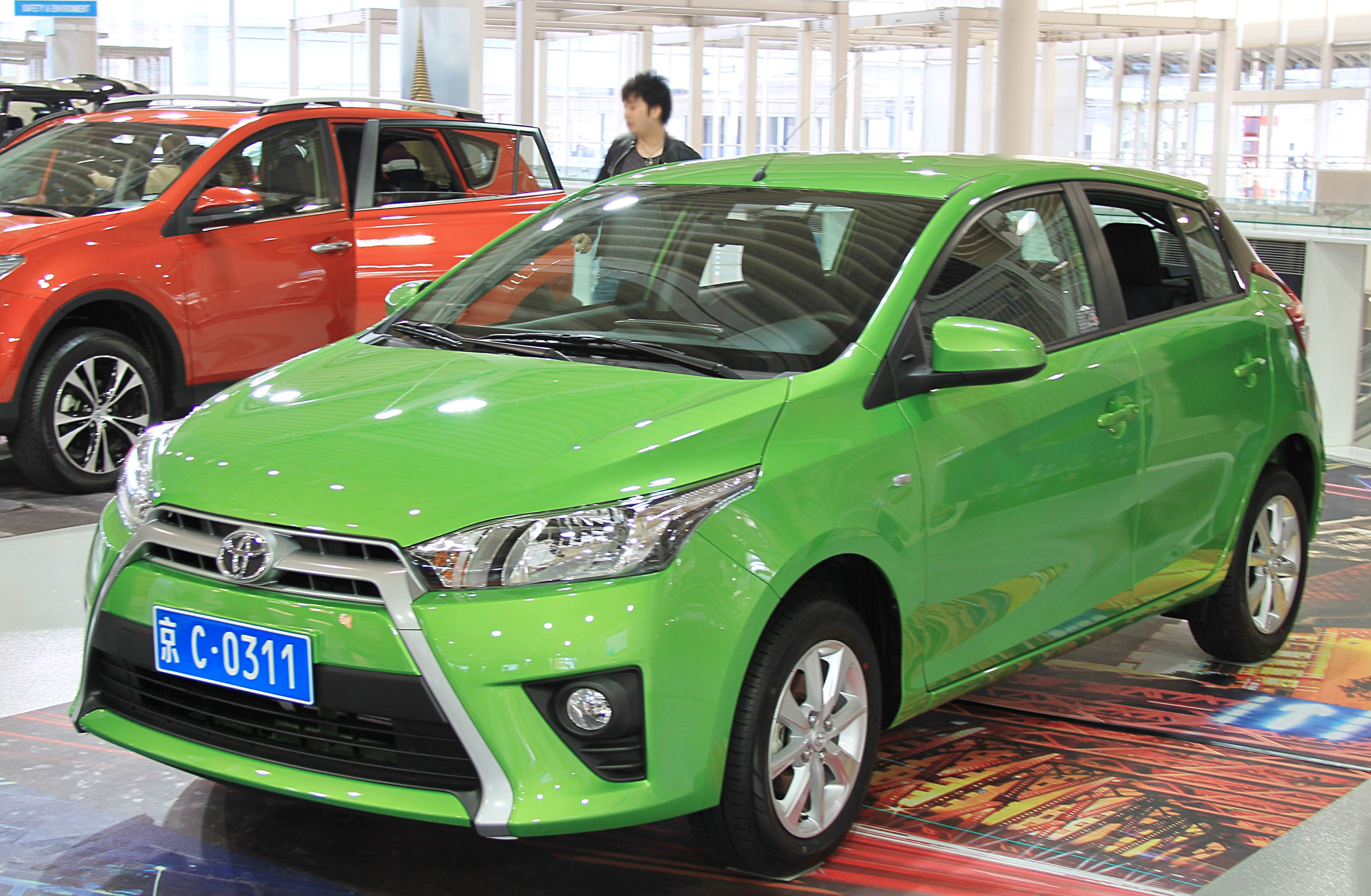
2013–2016
丰田致炫XP150
Toyota Yaris L

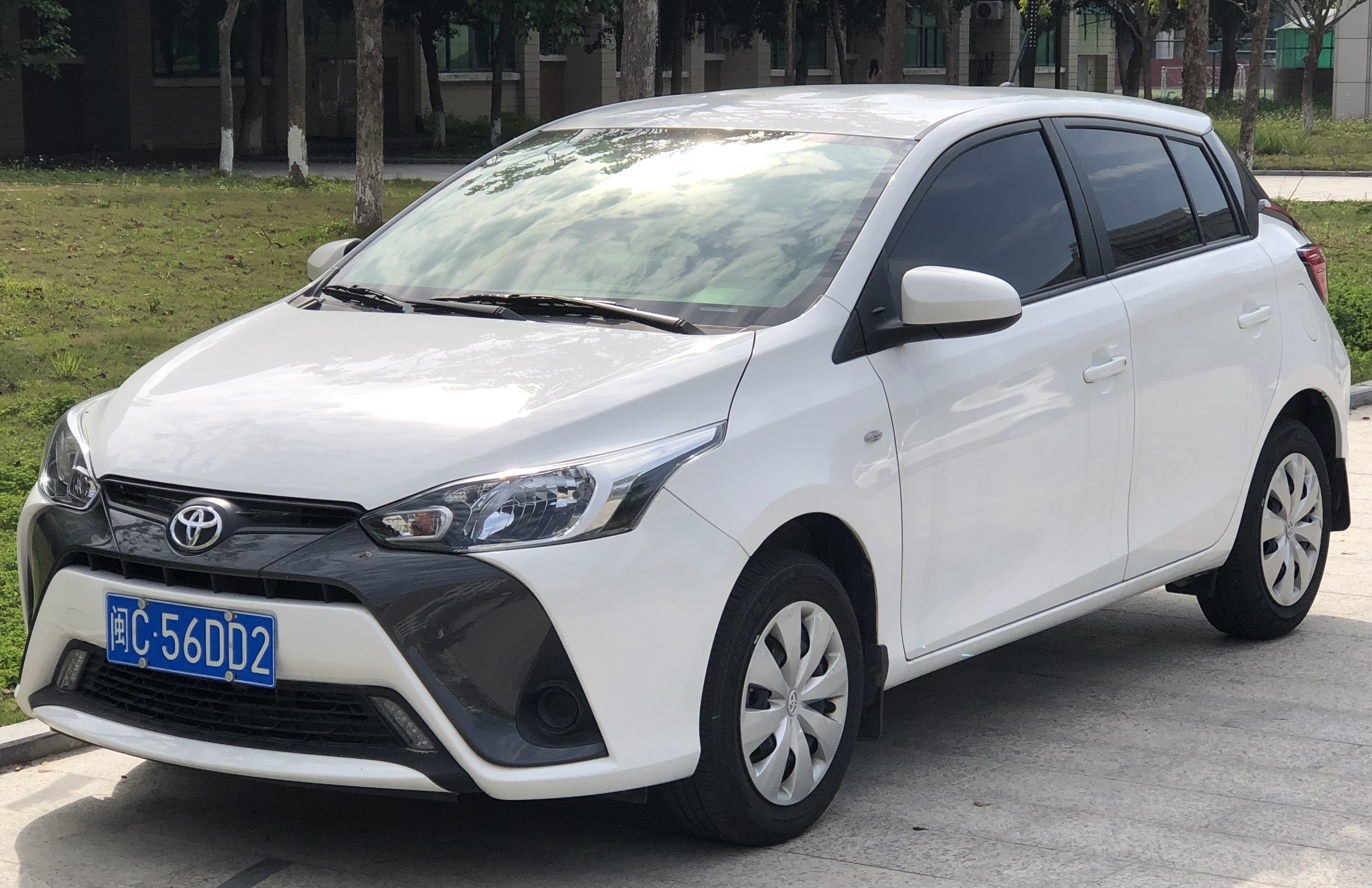
2016–2023
丰田致炫XP150
Toyota Yaris L XP150

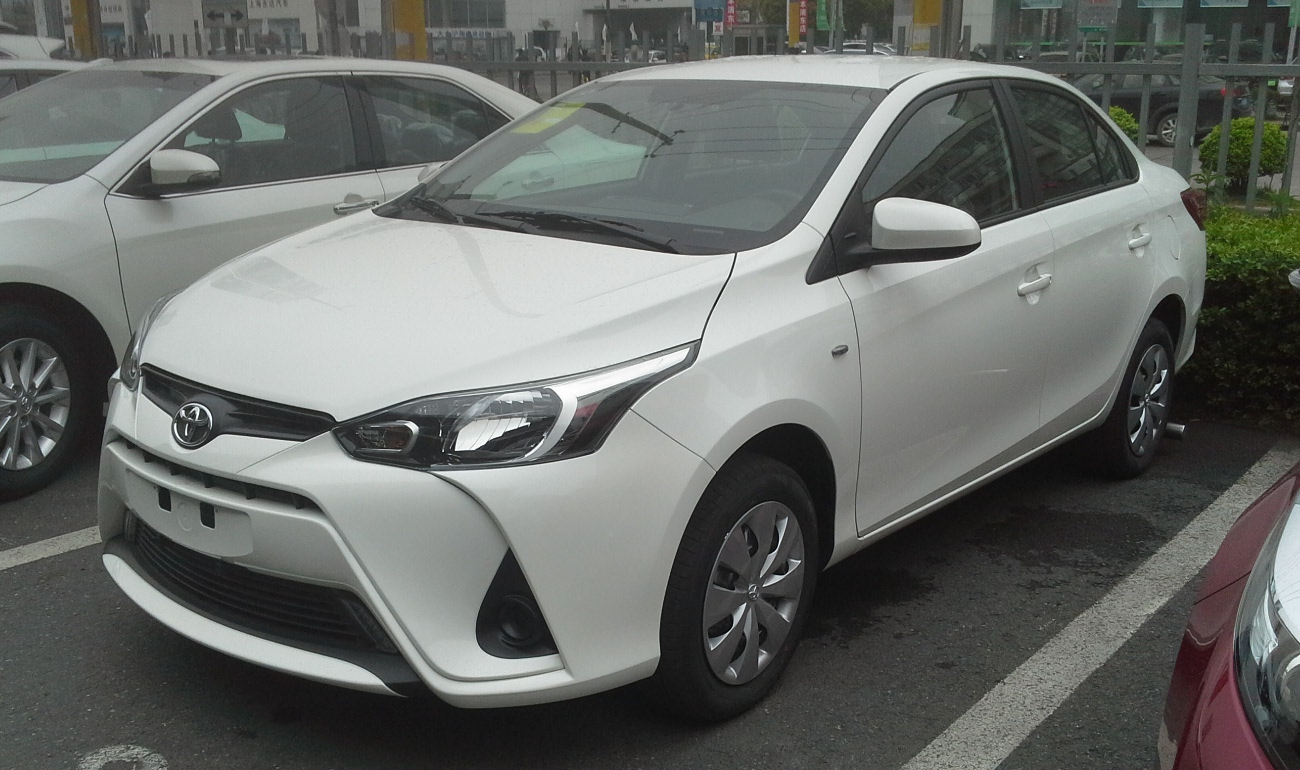
2016–2023
丰田致享XP150
Toyota Yaris L Sedan XP150

=== Imported Vehicles ===
==== Toyota (Imported by TMCI) ====
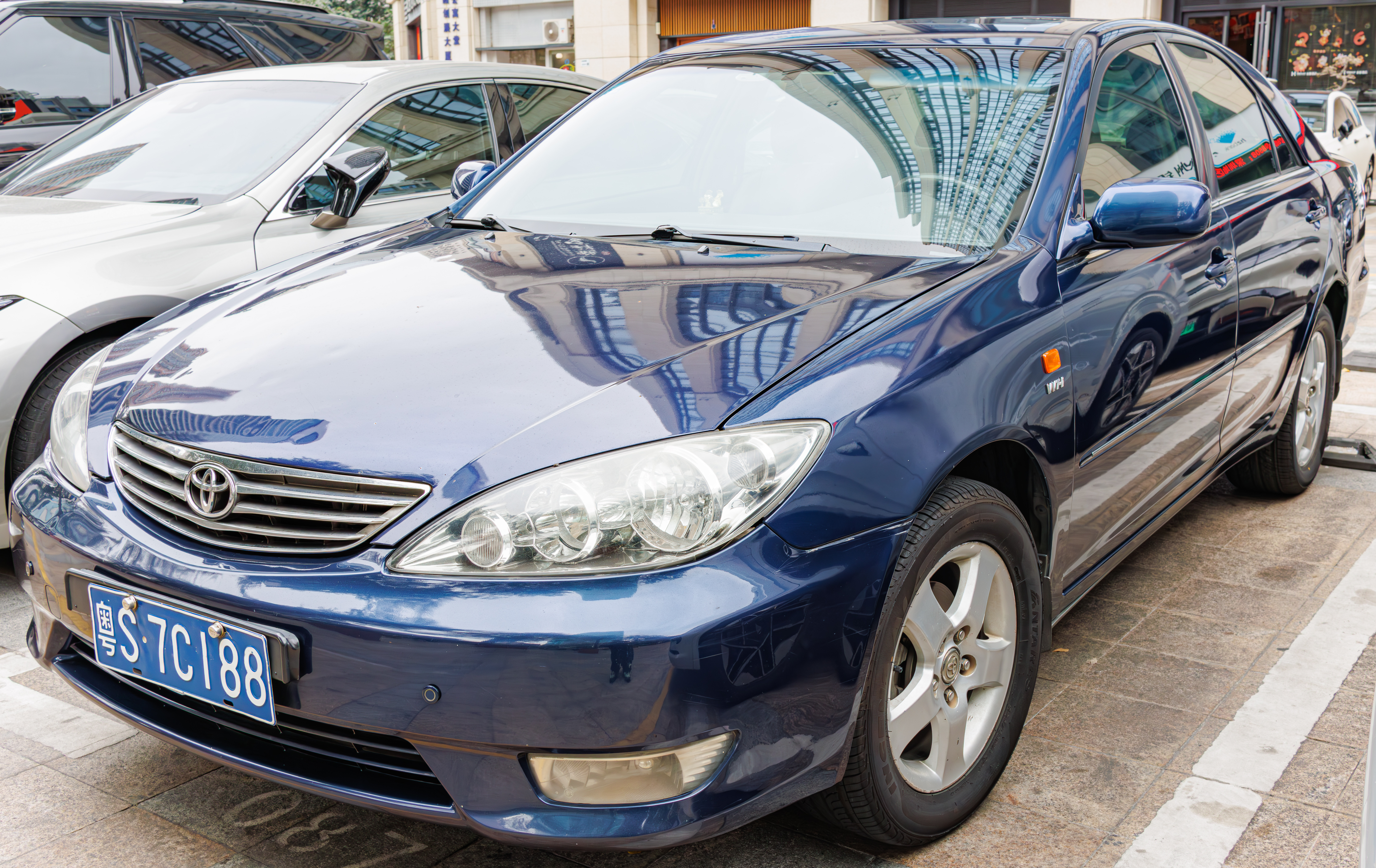
2001–2006
丰田Camry XV30
Toyota Camry XV30

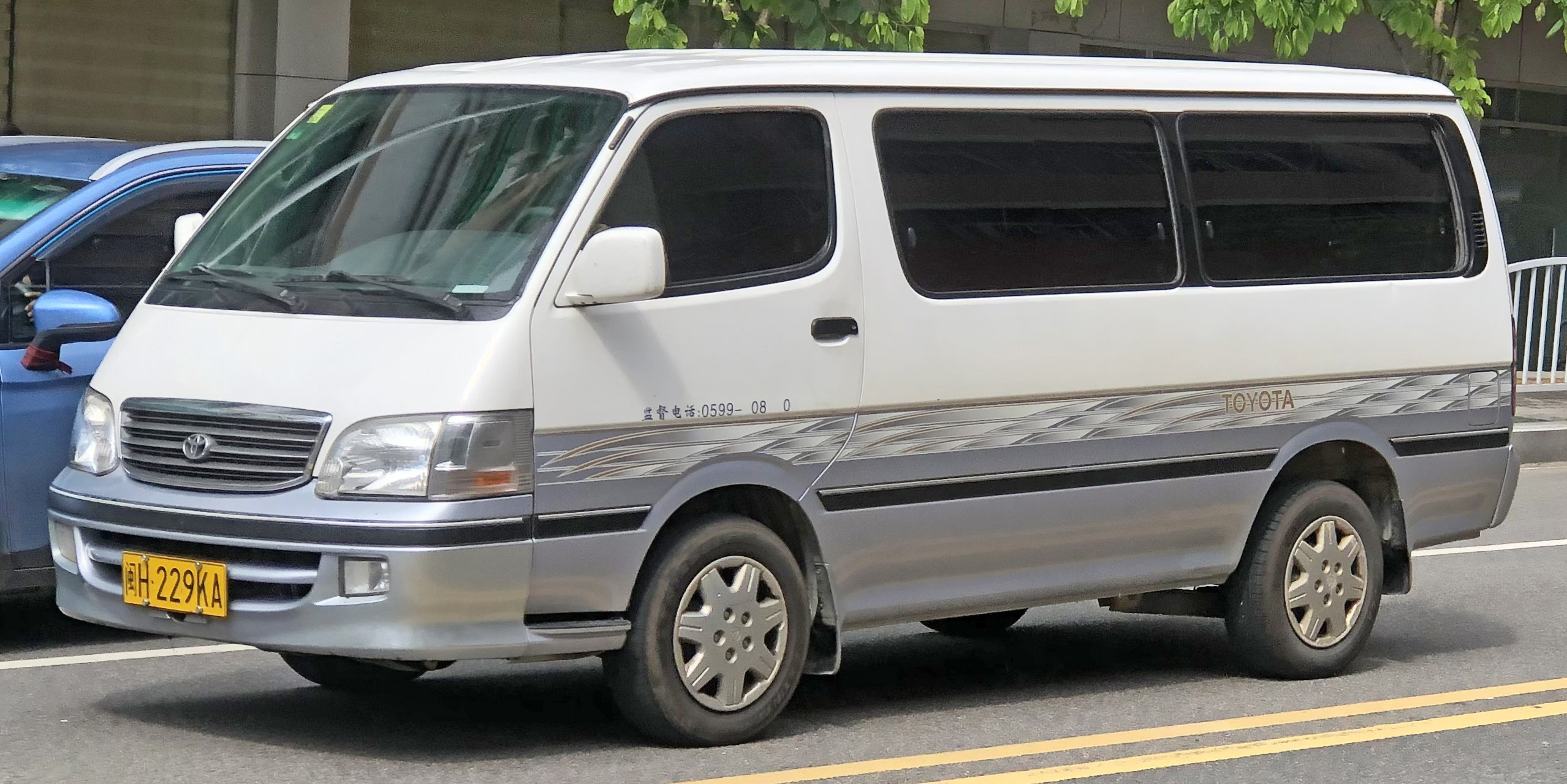
1990s–2000s
丰田海狮H100
Toyota HiAce H100

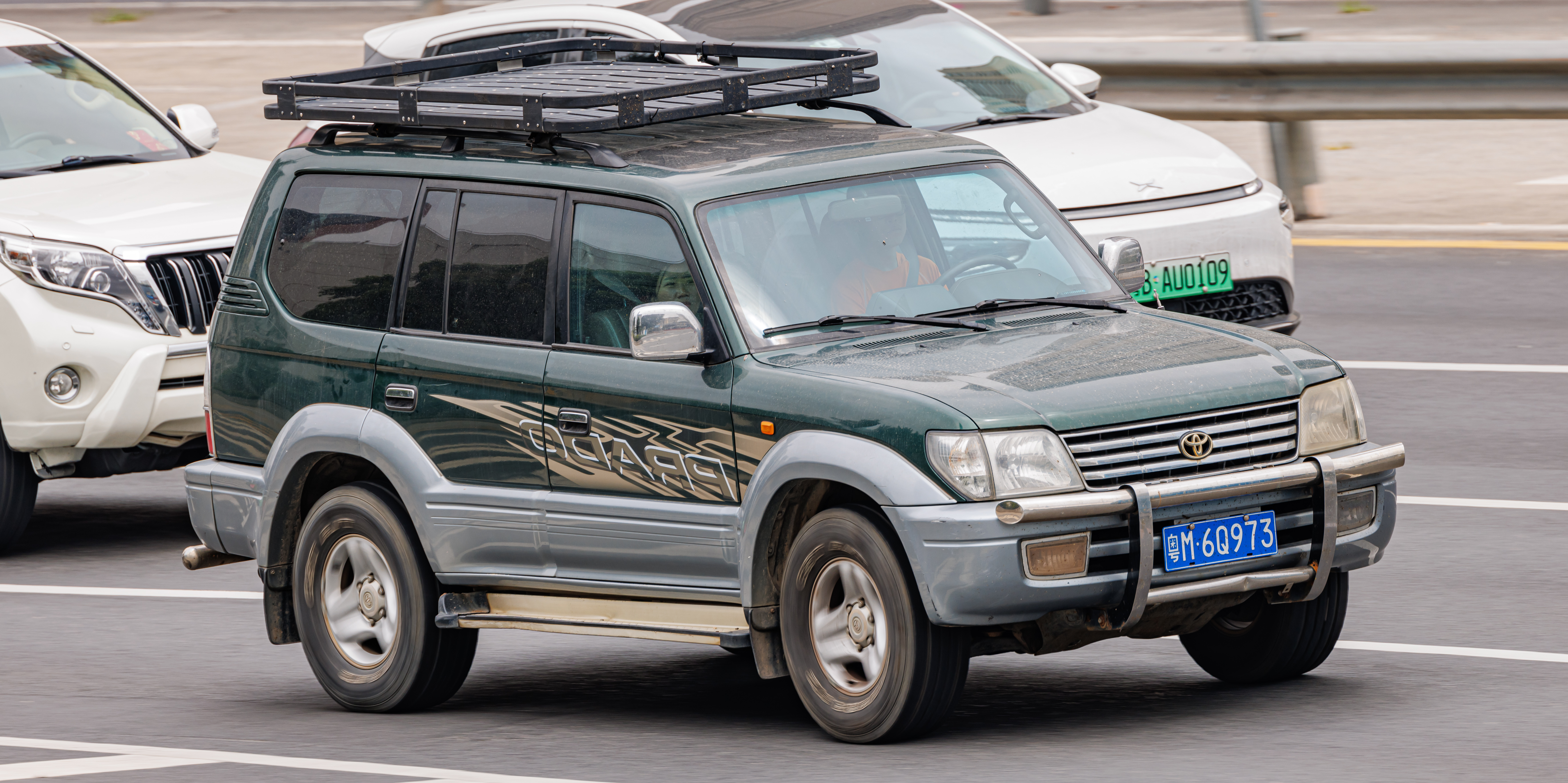
1996–2000s
丰田Land Cruiser Prado J90
Toyota Land Cruiser Prado J90

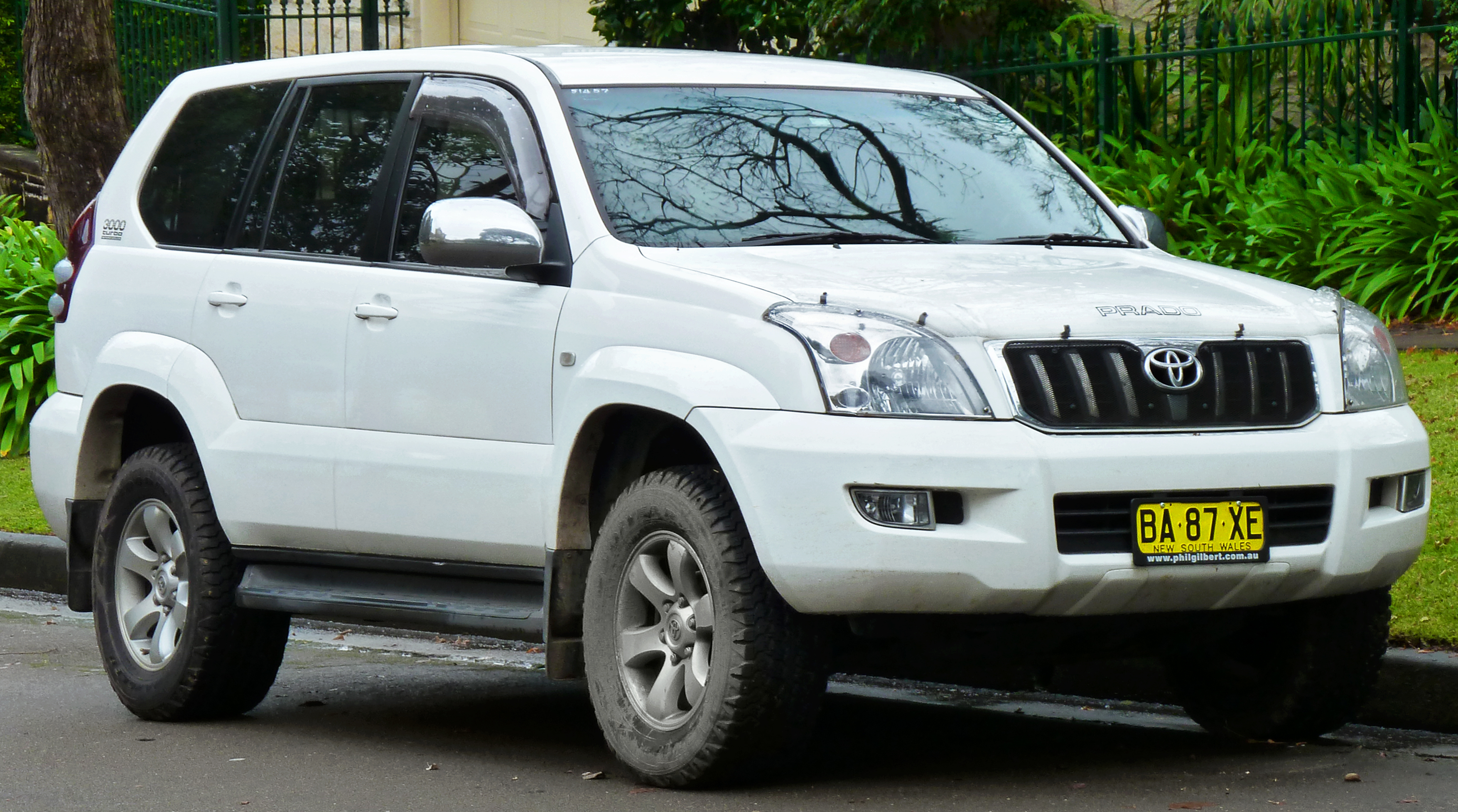
2003–2010
丰田普拉多J120 (进口)
Toyota Land Cruiser Prado J120 (imported)

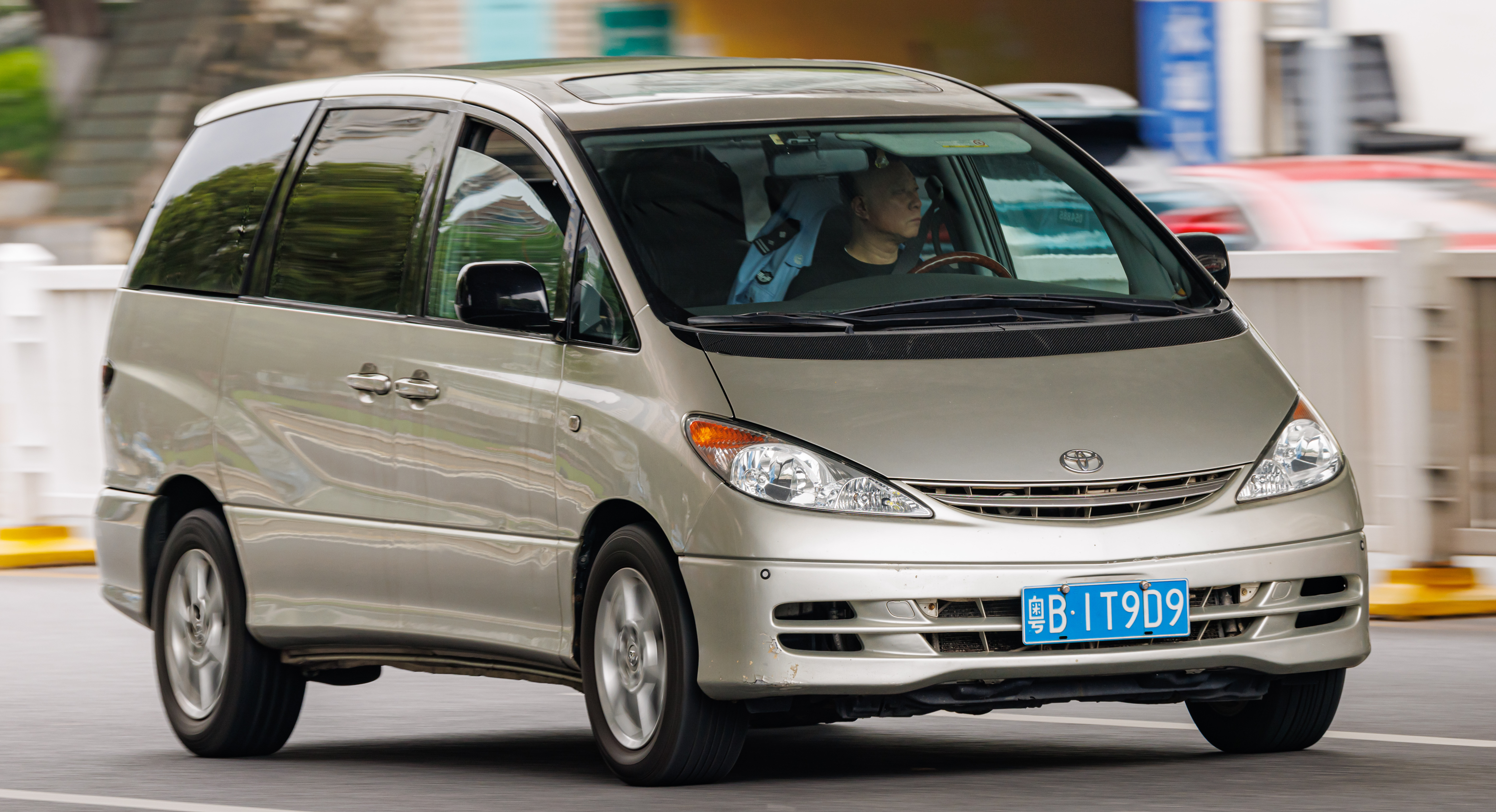
2000–2006
丰田Previa XR30
Toyota Previa XR30

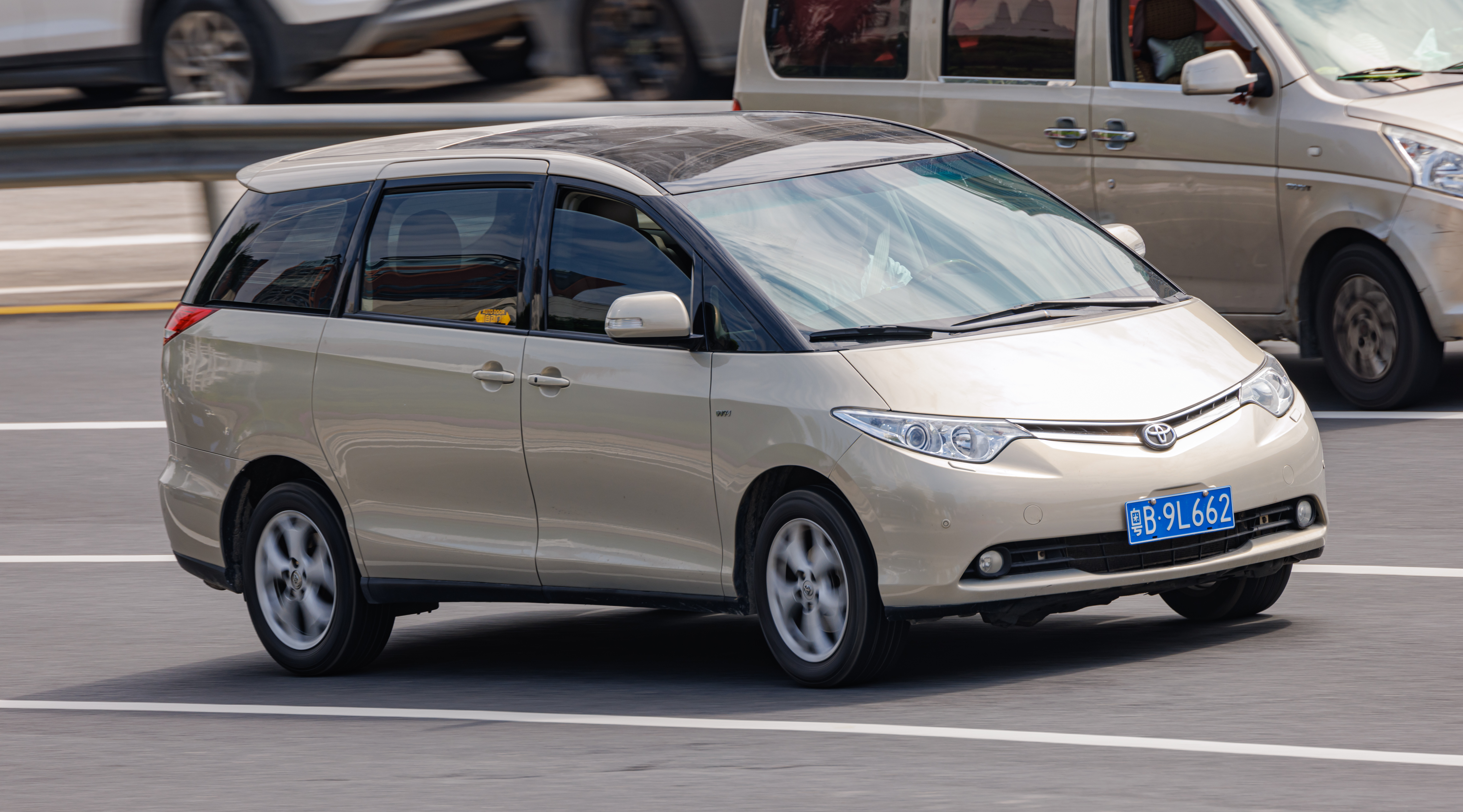
2006–2010
丰田Previa XR50
Toyota Previa XR50

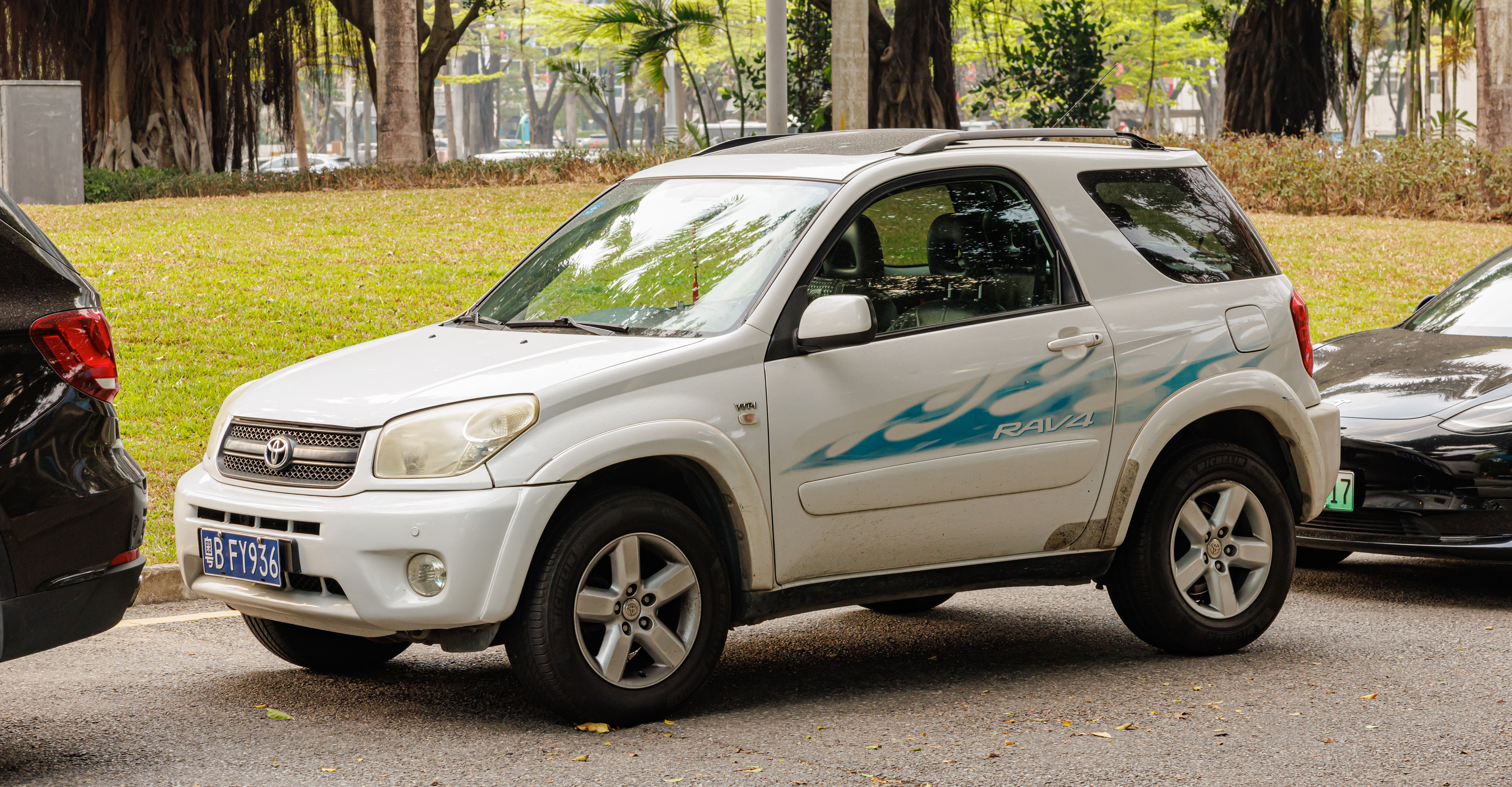
2003–2006
丰田RAV4 XA20
Toyota RAV4 XA20

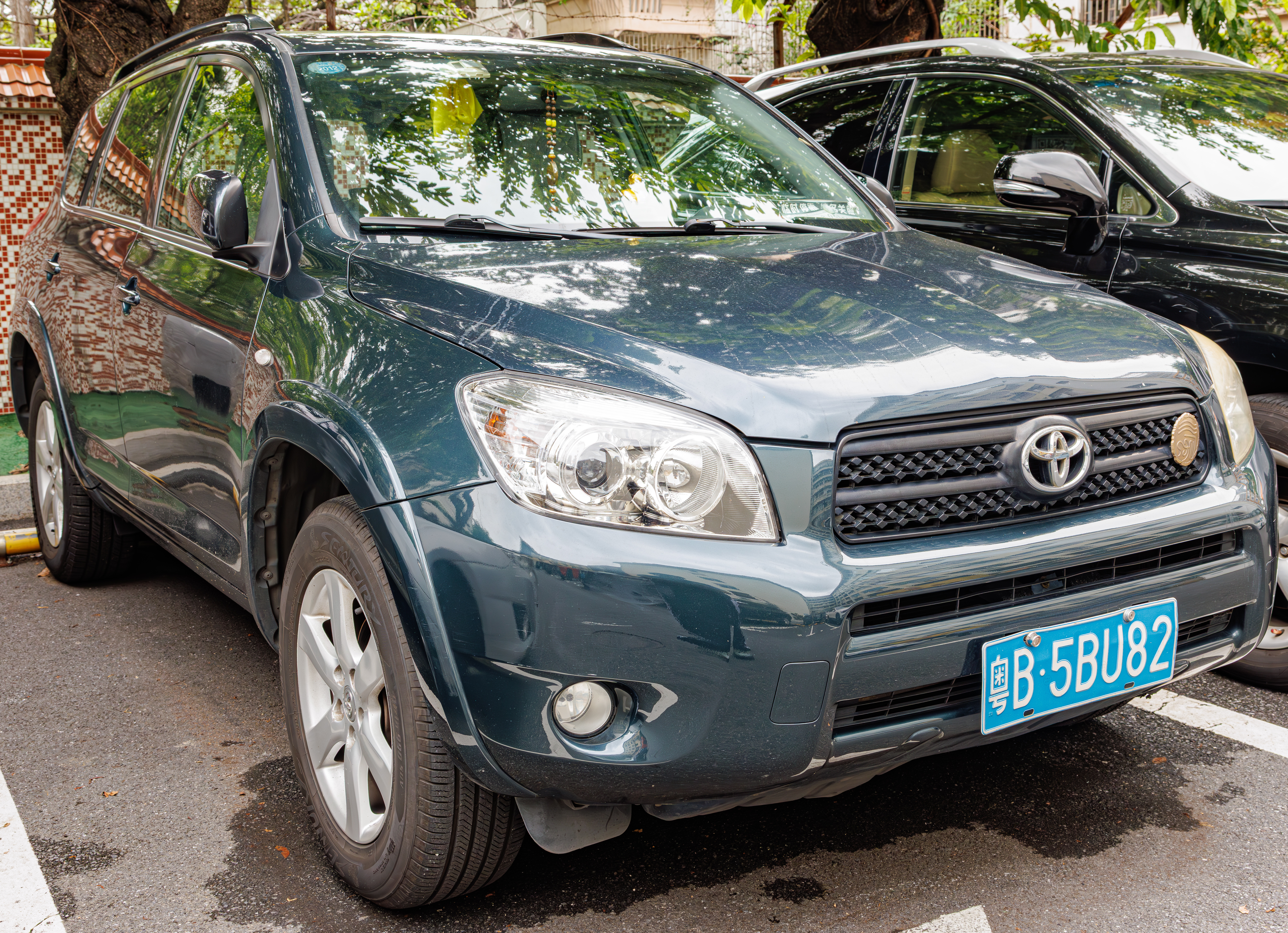
2006–2009
丰田RAV4 XA30
Toyota RAV4 XA30

==== Toyota (Imported by FAW Toyota) ====
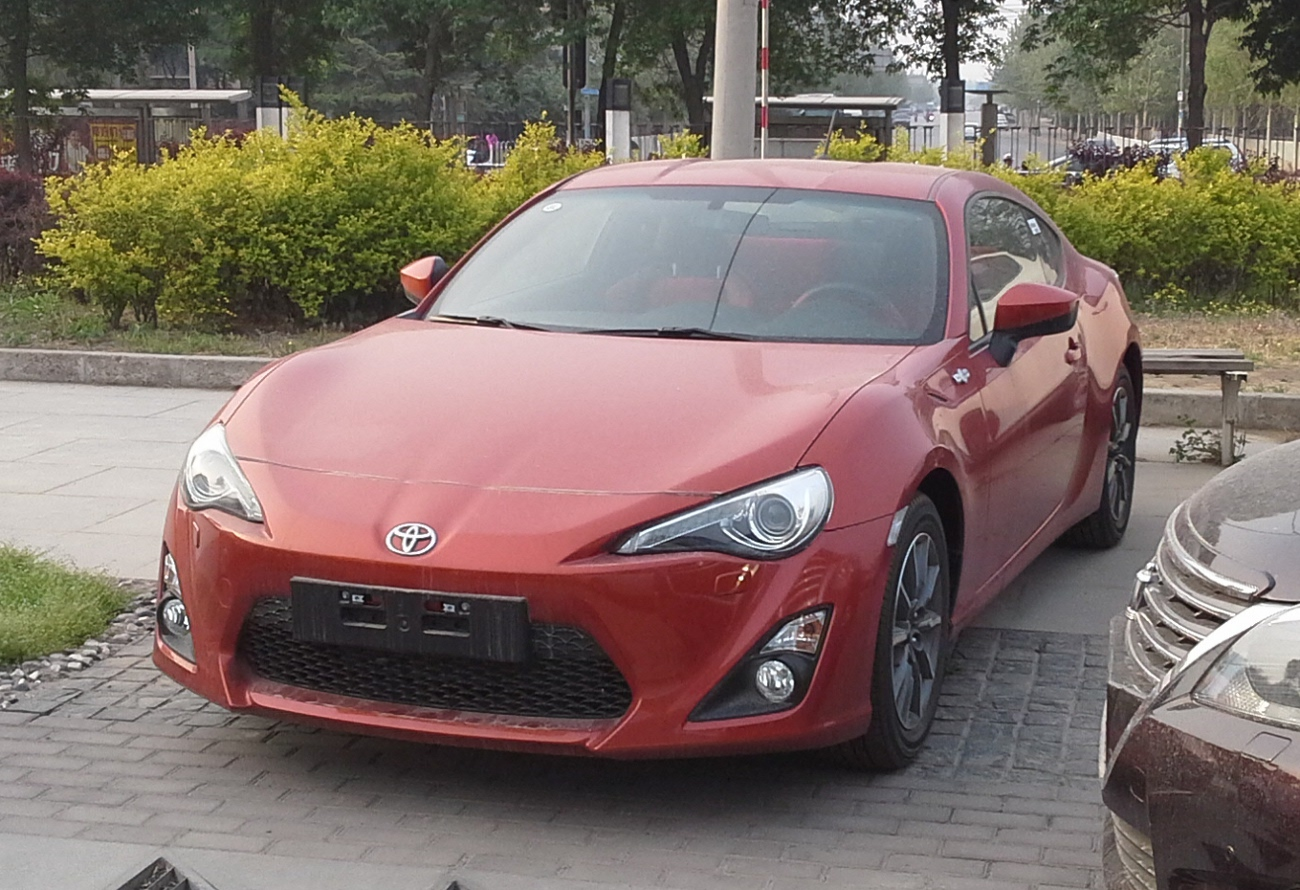
2013–2018
丰田86
Toyota 86

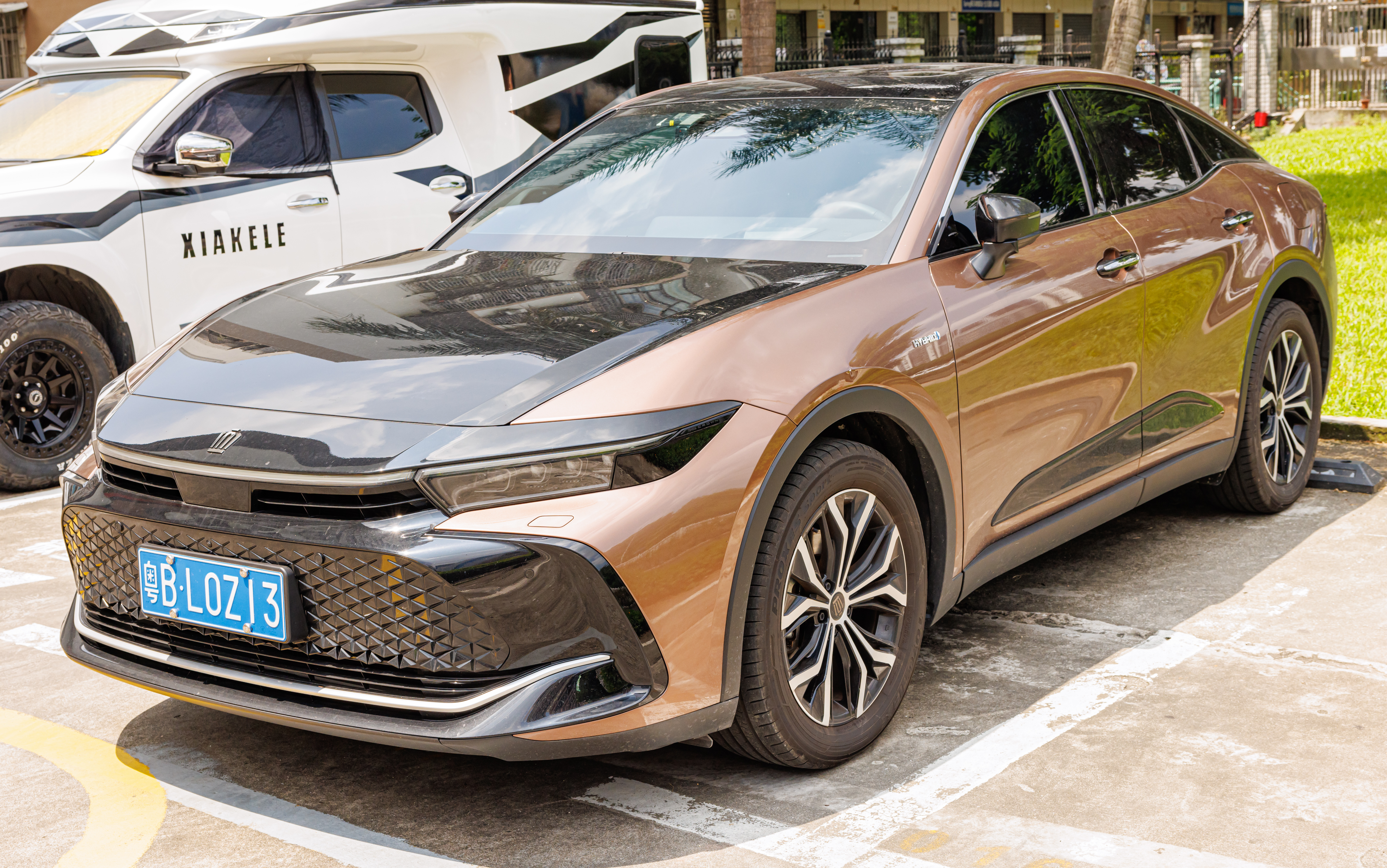
2022–2026
丰田皇冠SportCross S235
Toyota Crown SportCross S235

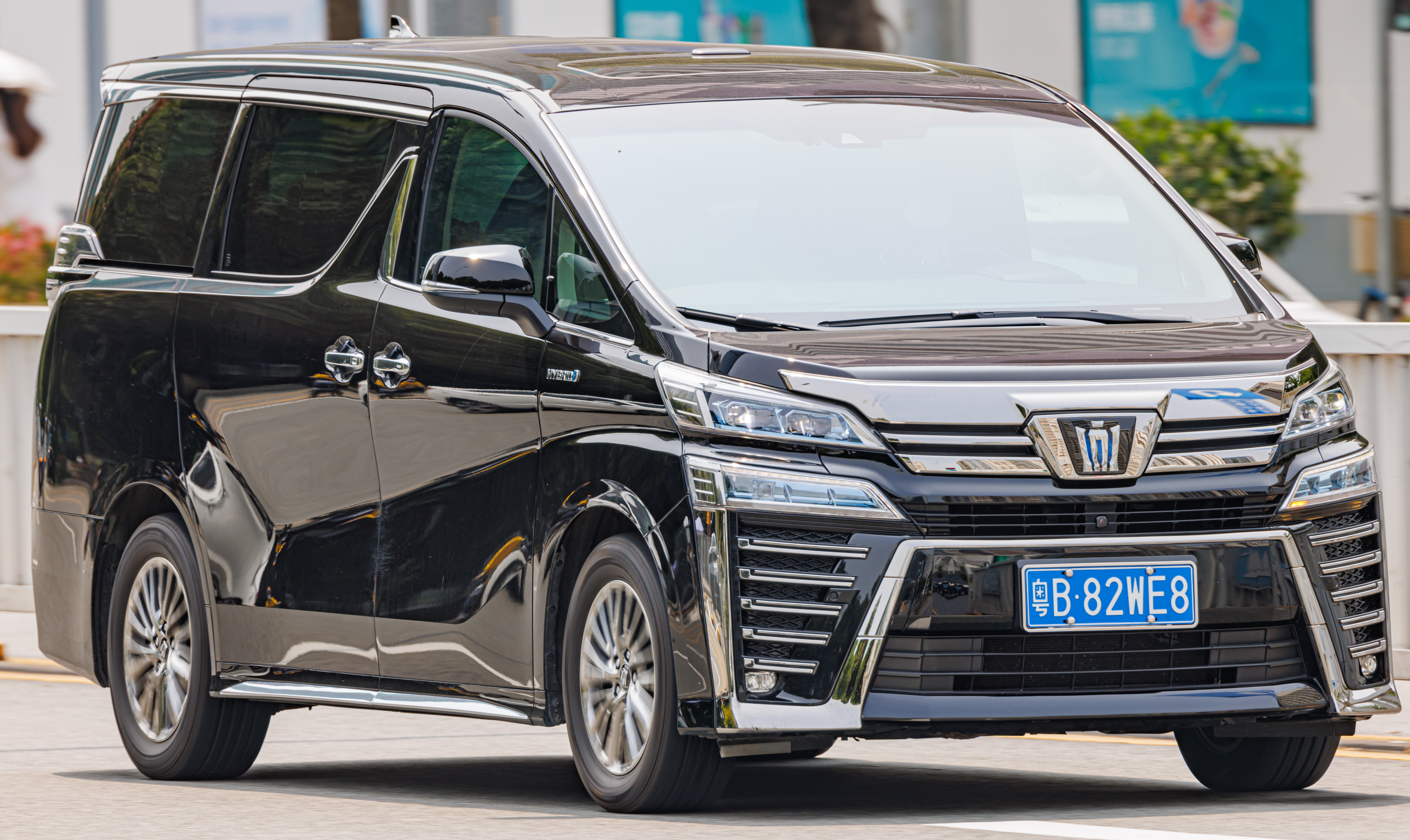
2021–2023
丰田皇冠威尔法AH30
Toyota Crown Vellfire AH30

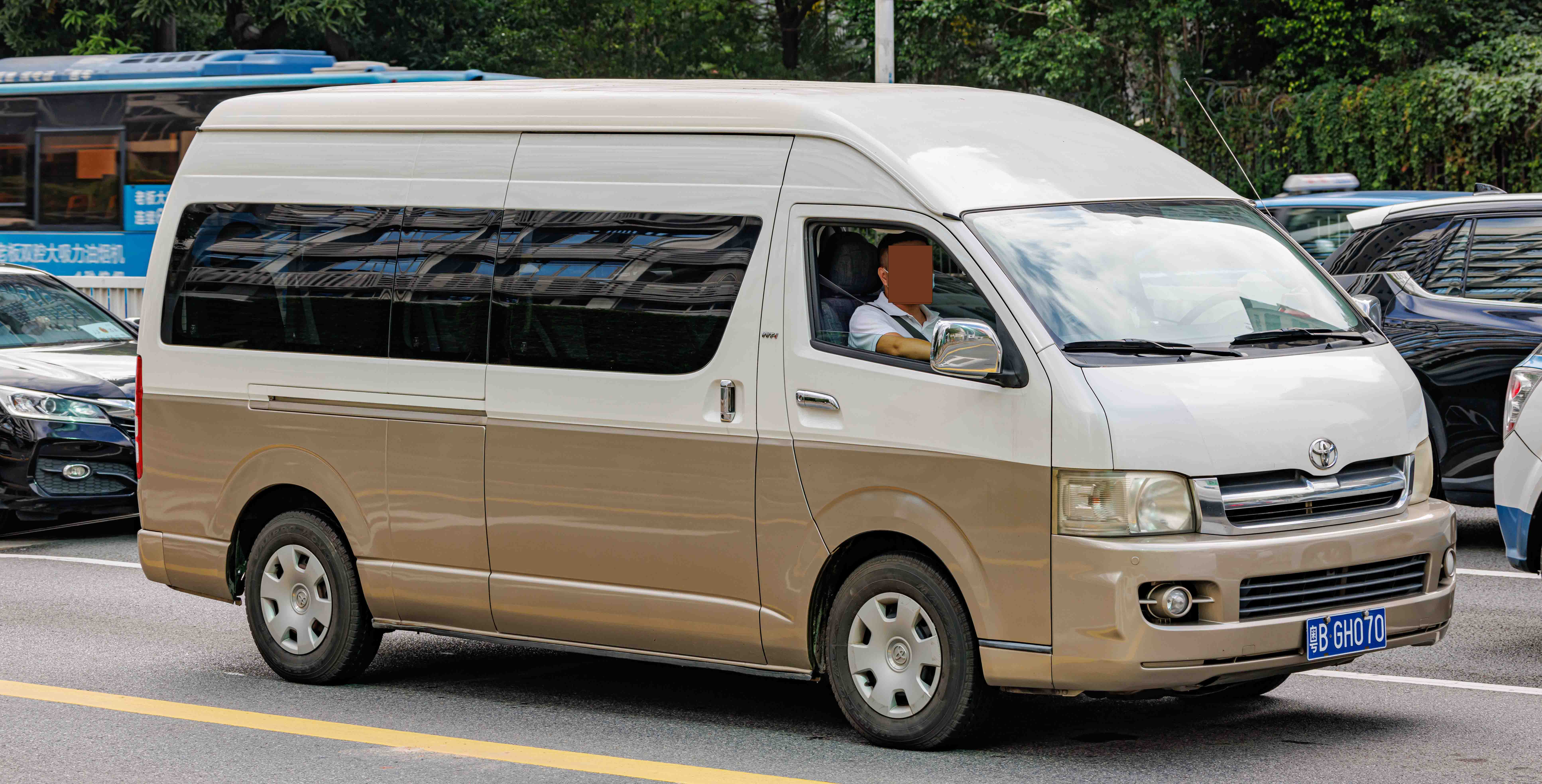
2010–2018
丰田海艾士H200
Toyota Hiace H200

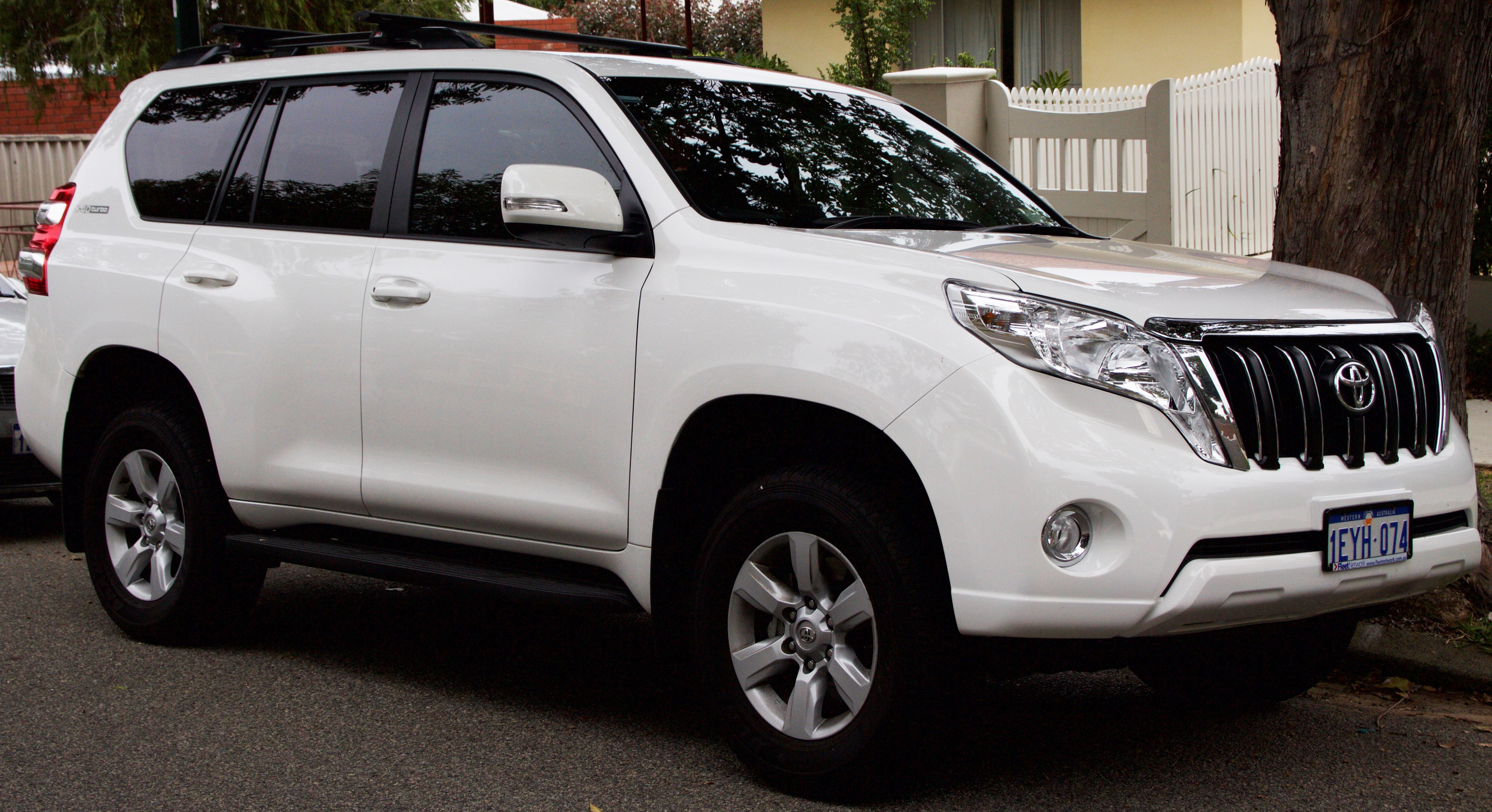
2010–2014
丰田普拉多J150 2.7L (进口)
Toyota Land Cruiser Prado J150 2.7L (imported)

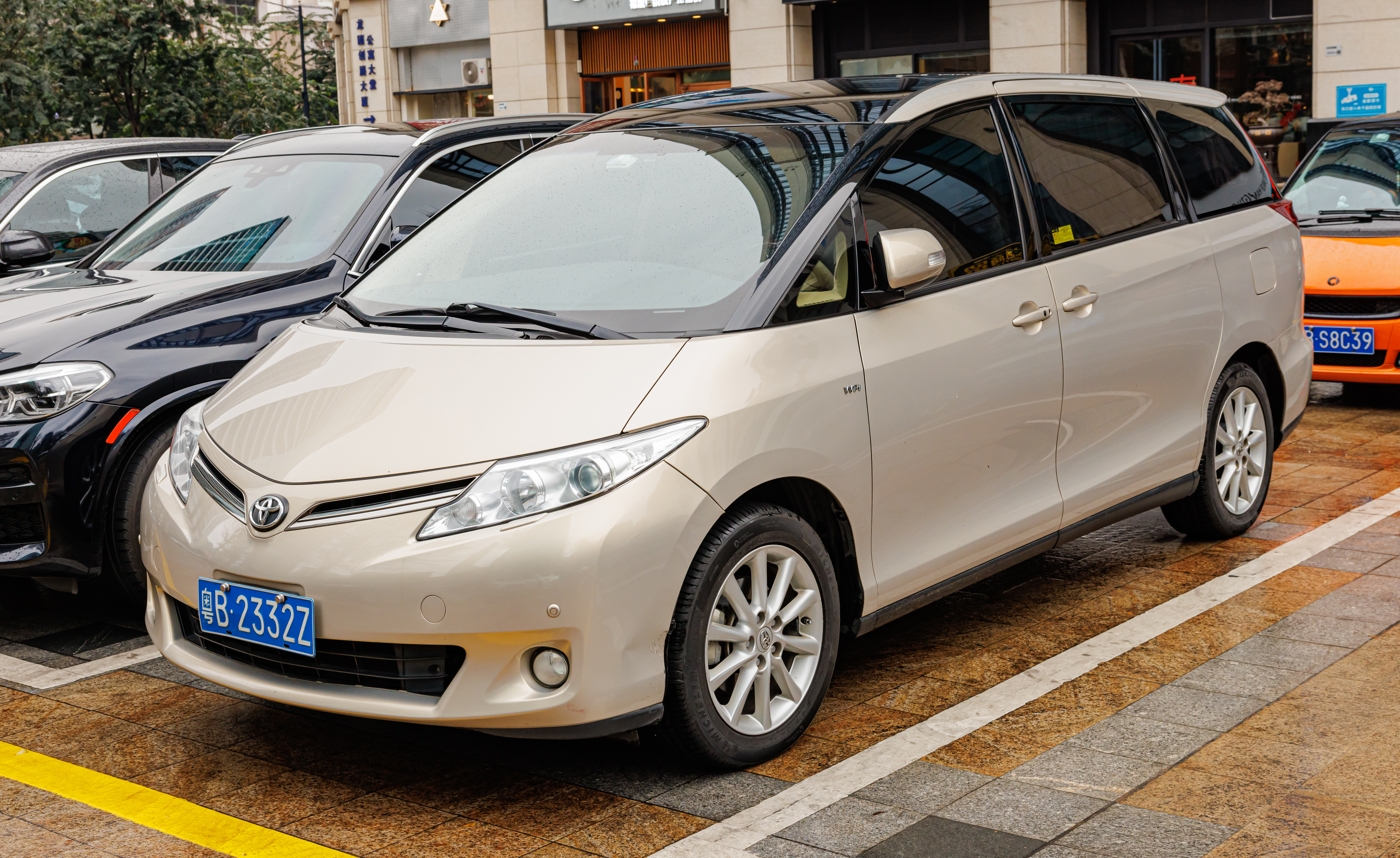
2010–2018
丰田普瑞维亚XR50
Toyota Previa XR50

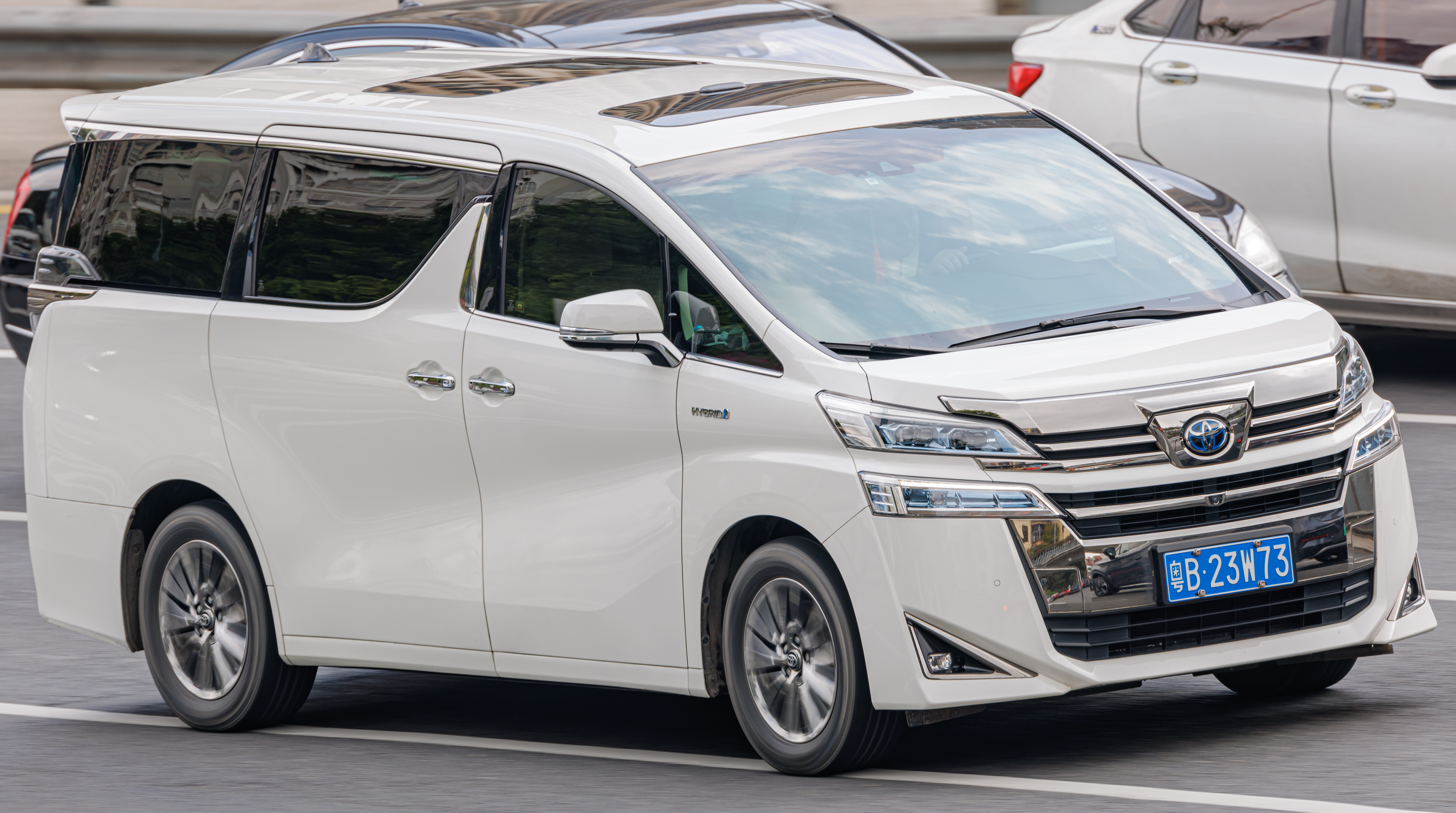
2019–2021
丰田威尔法双擎AH30
Toyota Vellfire Hybrid AH30

==== Toyota (Imported by GAC Toyota) ====
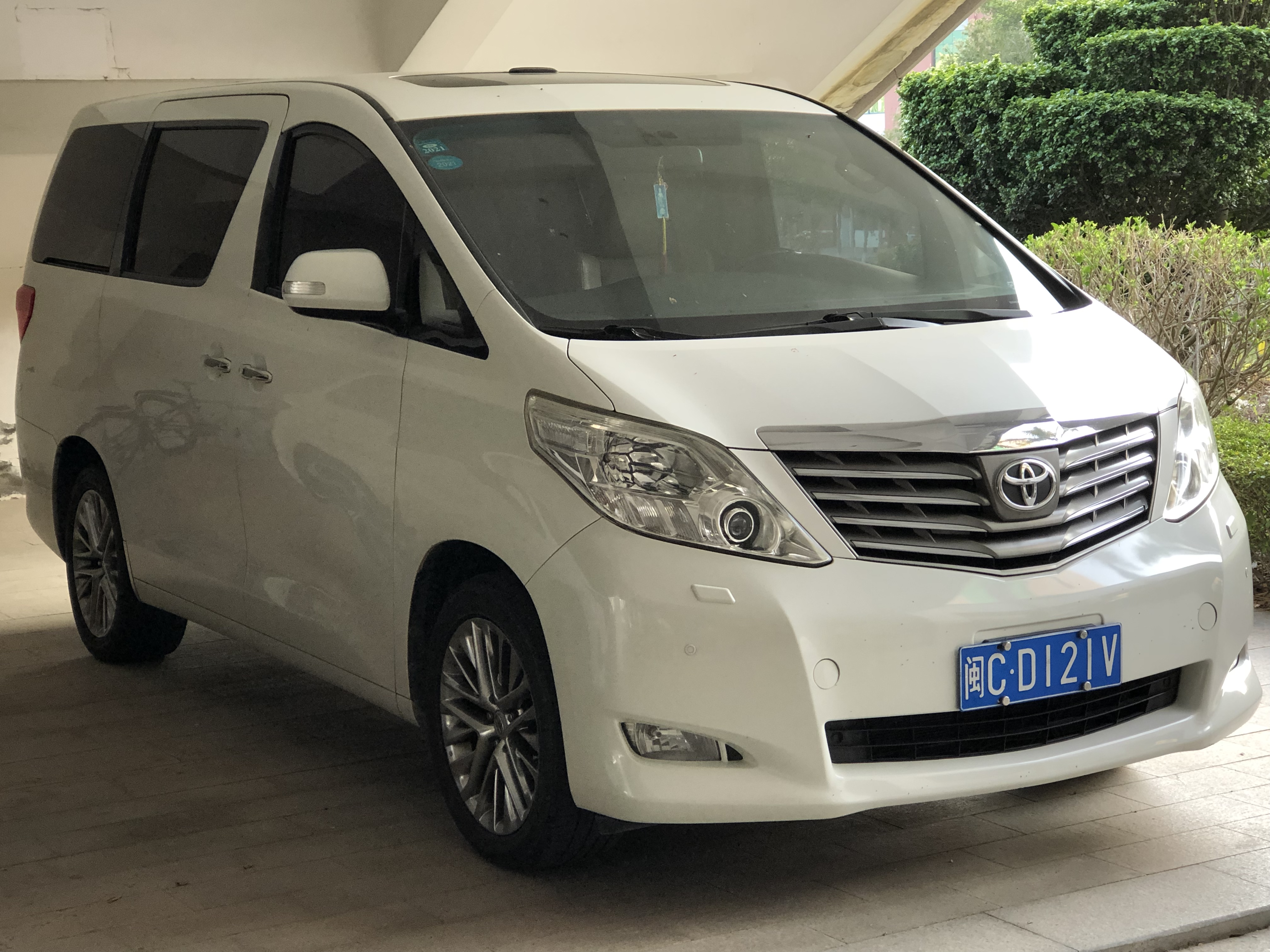
2010–2012
丰田埃尔法AH20
Toyota Alphard AH20

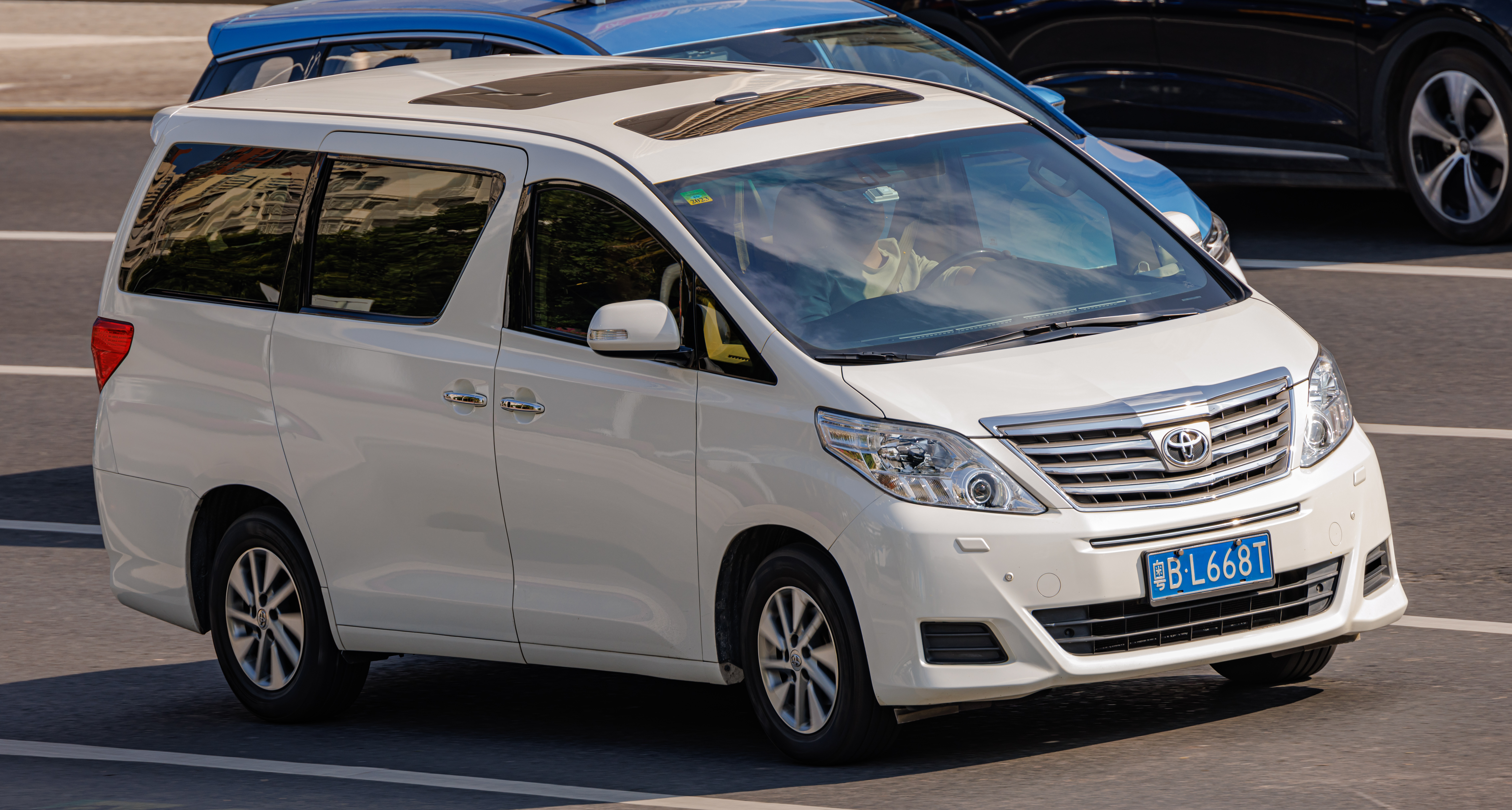
2012–2015
丰田埃尔法AH20
Toyota Alphard AH20

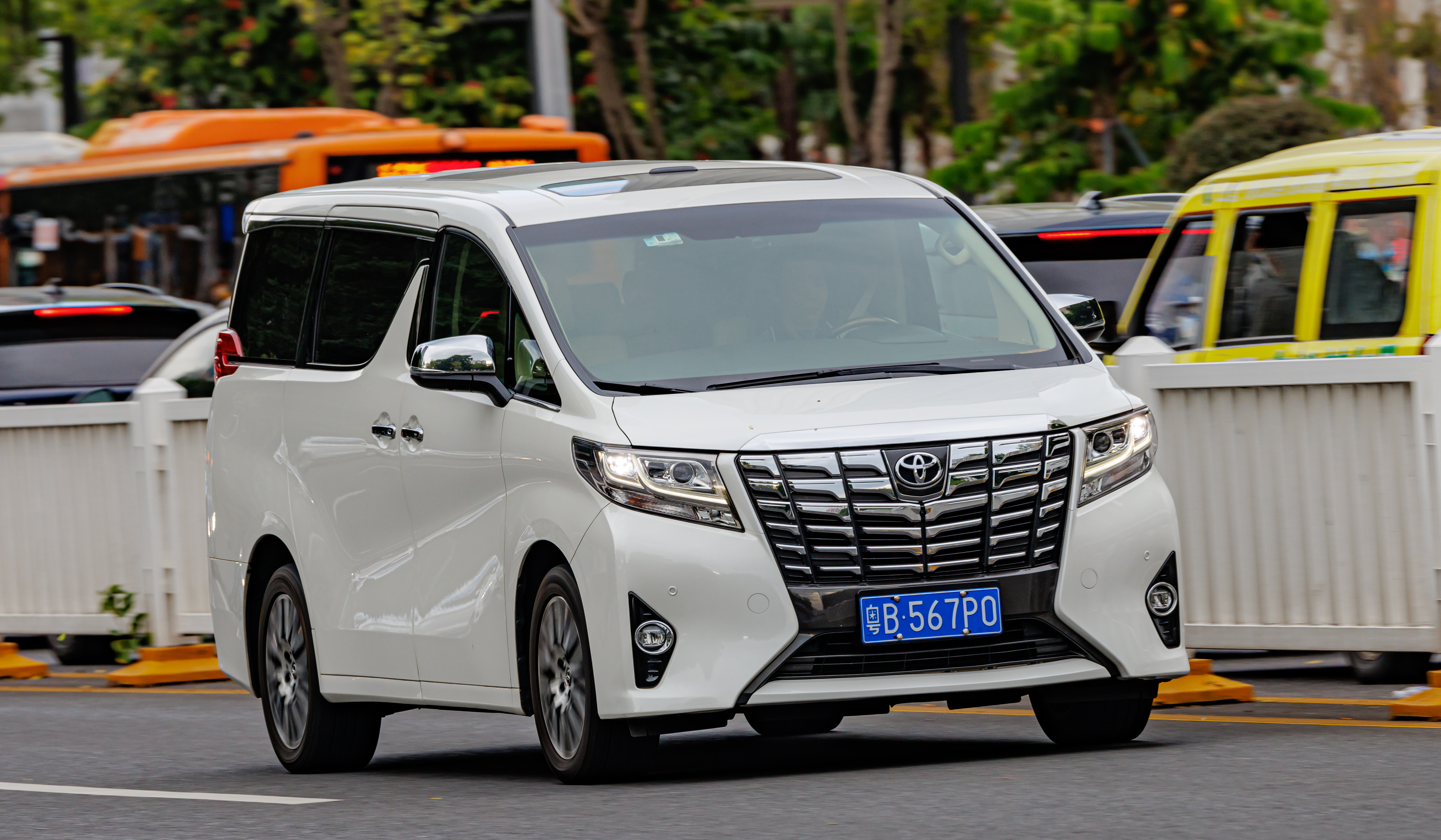
2015–2018
丰田埃尔法AH30
Toyota Alphard AH30

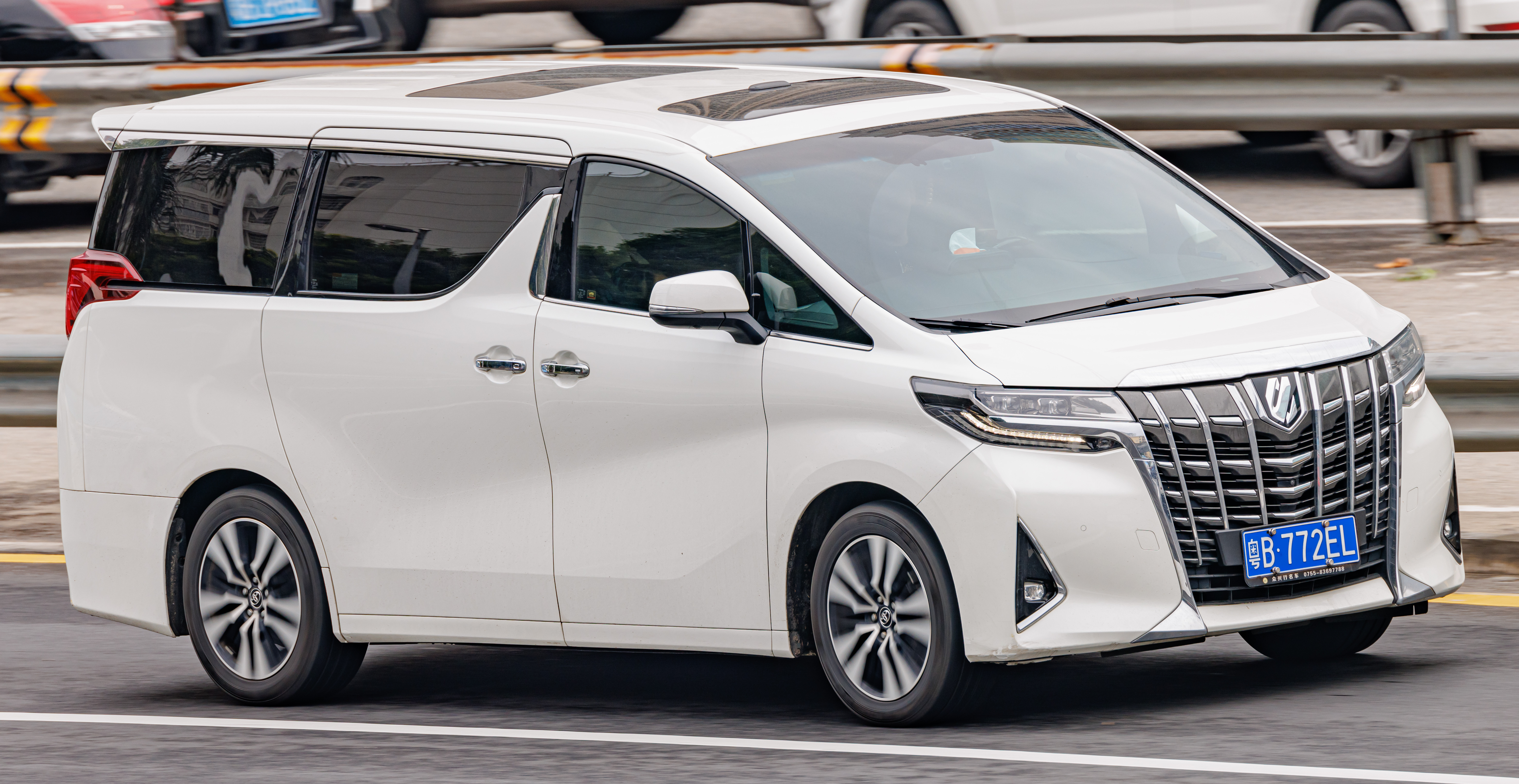
2018–2019
丰田埃尔法AH30
Toyota Alphard AH30

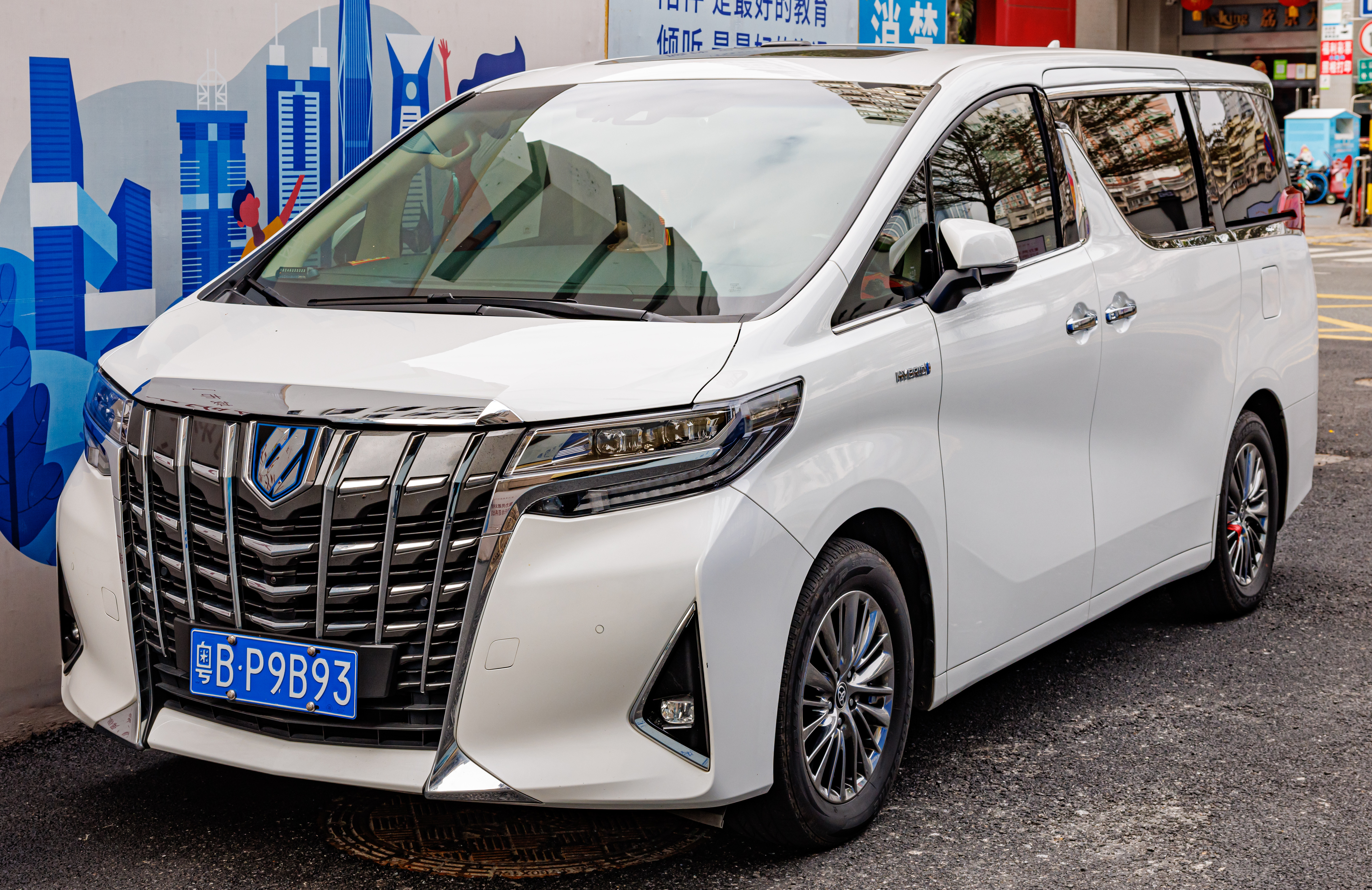
2019–2023
丰田埃尔法双擎AH30
Toyota Alphard Hybrid AH30

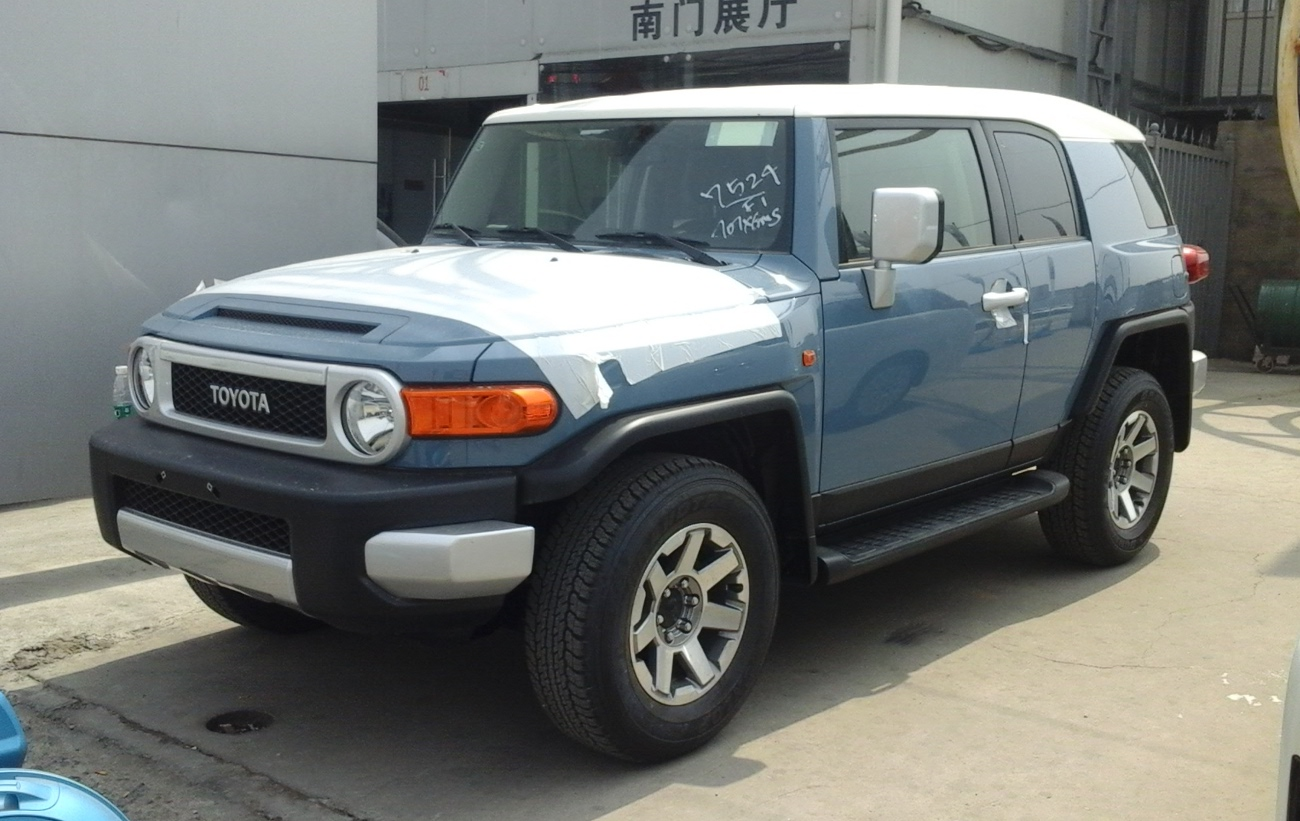
2007–2013
丰田FJ酷路泽
Toyota FJ Cruiser

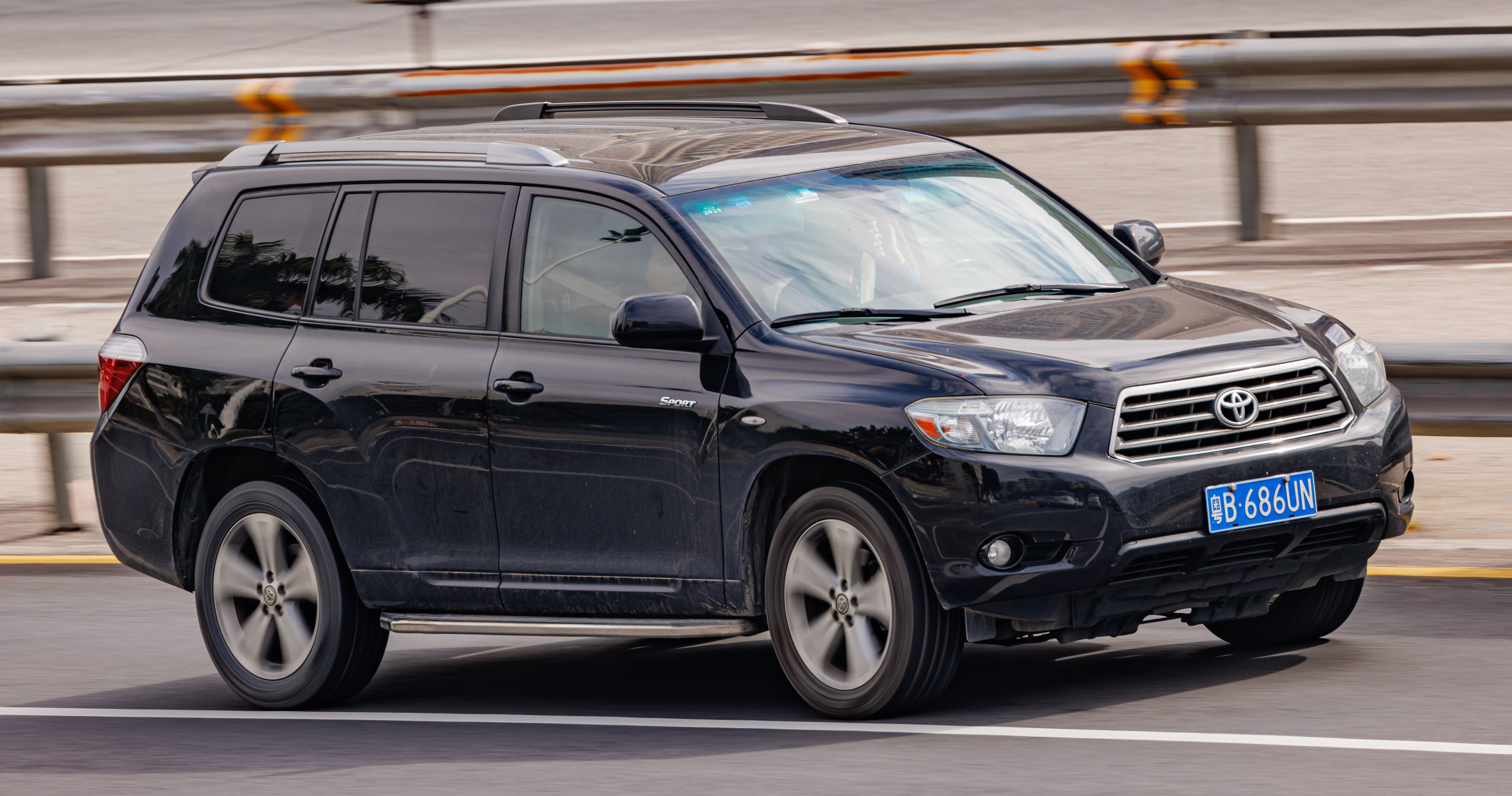
2007–2009
丰田汉兰达XU40
Toyota Highlander XU40

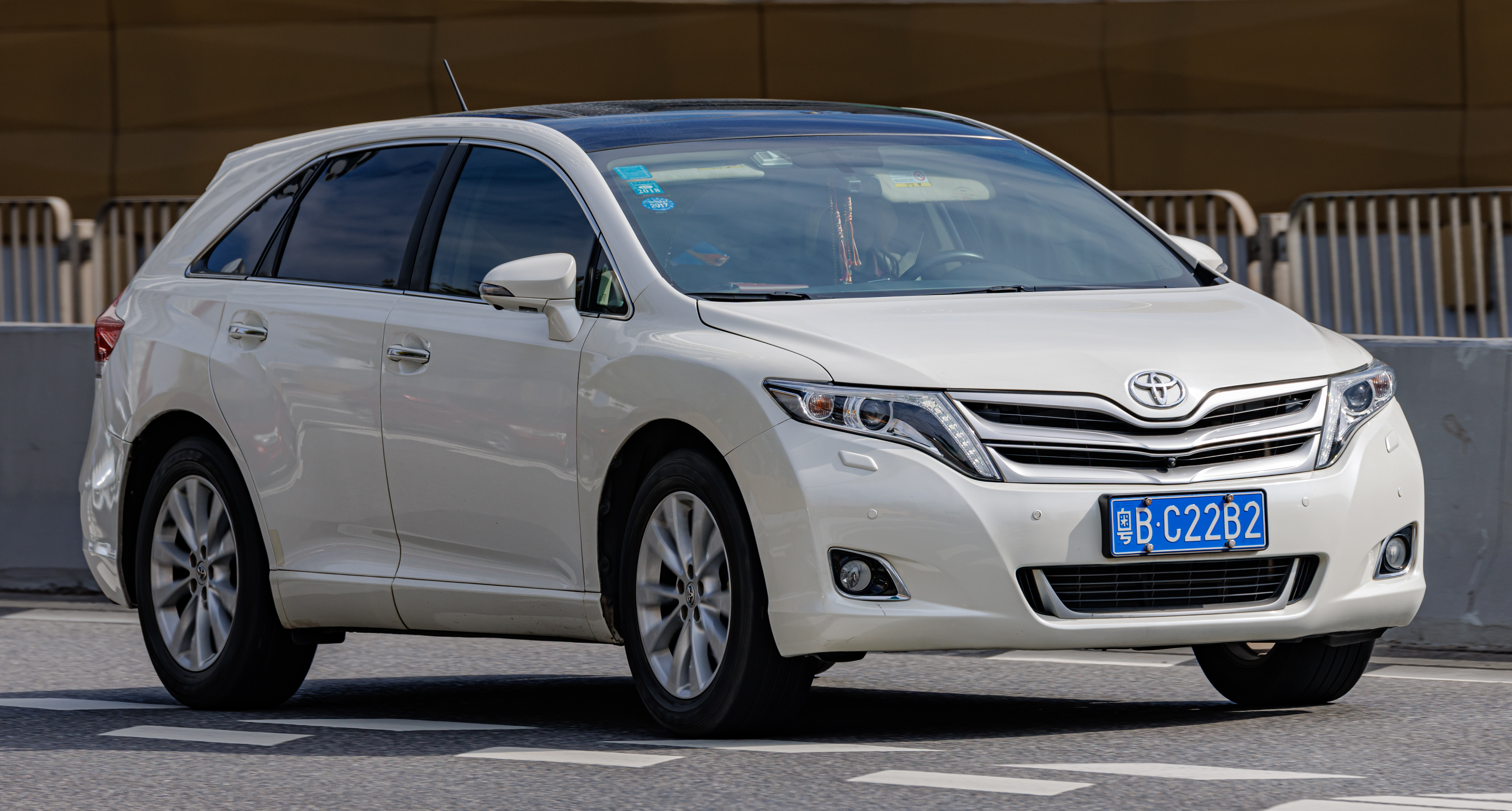
2013
丰田威飒
Toyota Venza

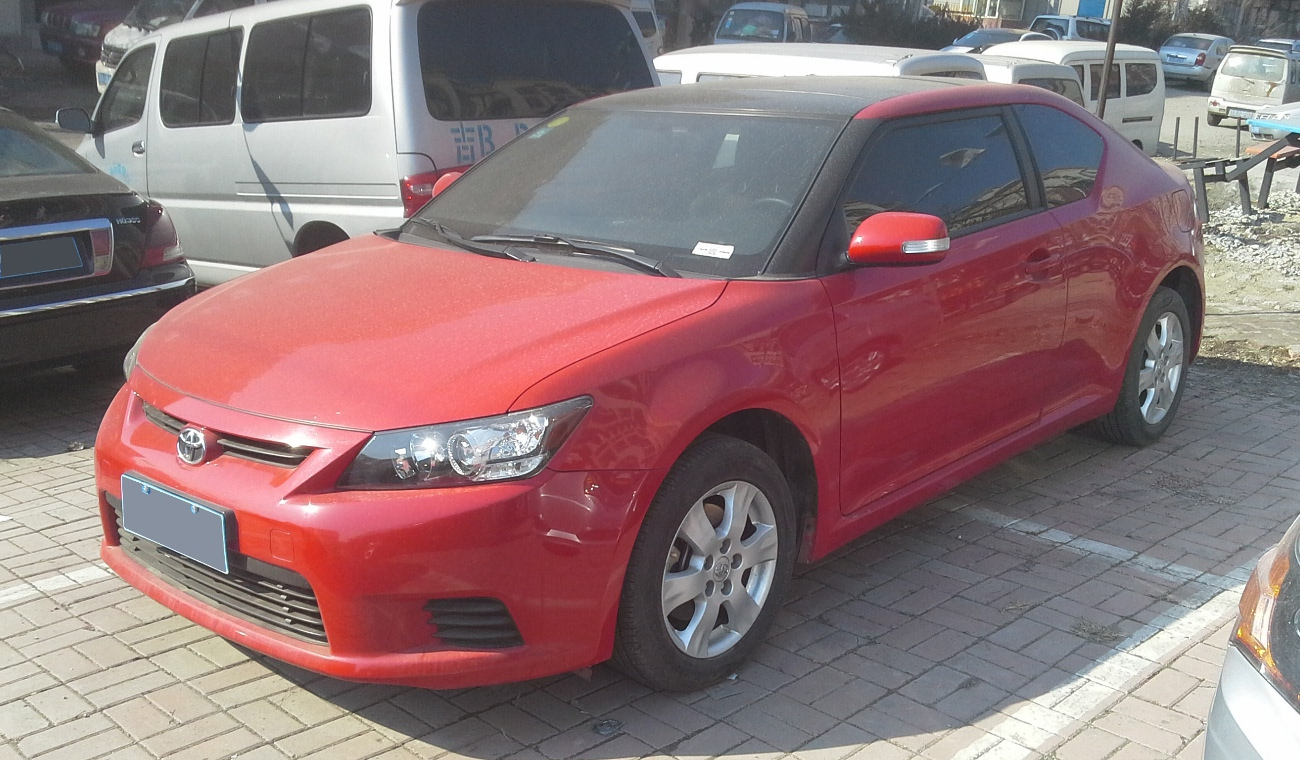
2011–2014
丰田杰路驰
Toyota Zelas

==== Lexus ====
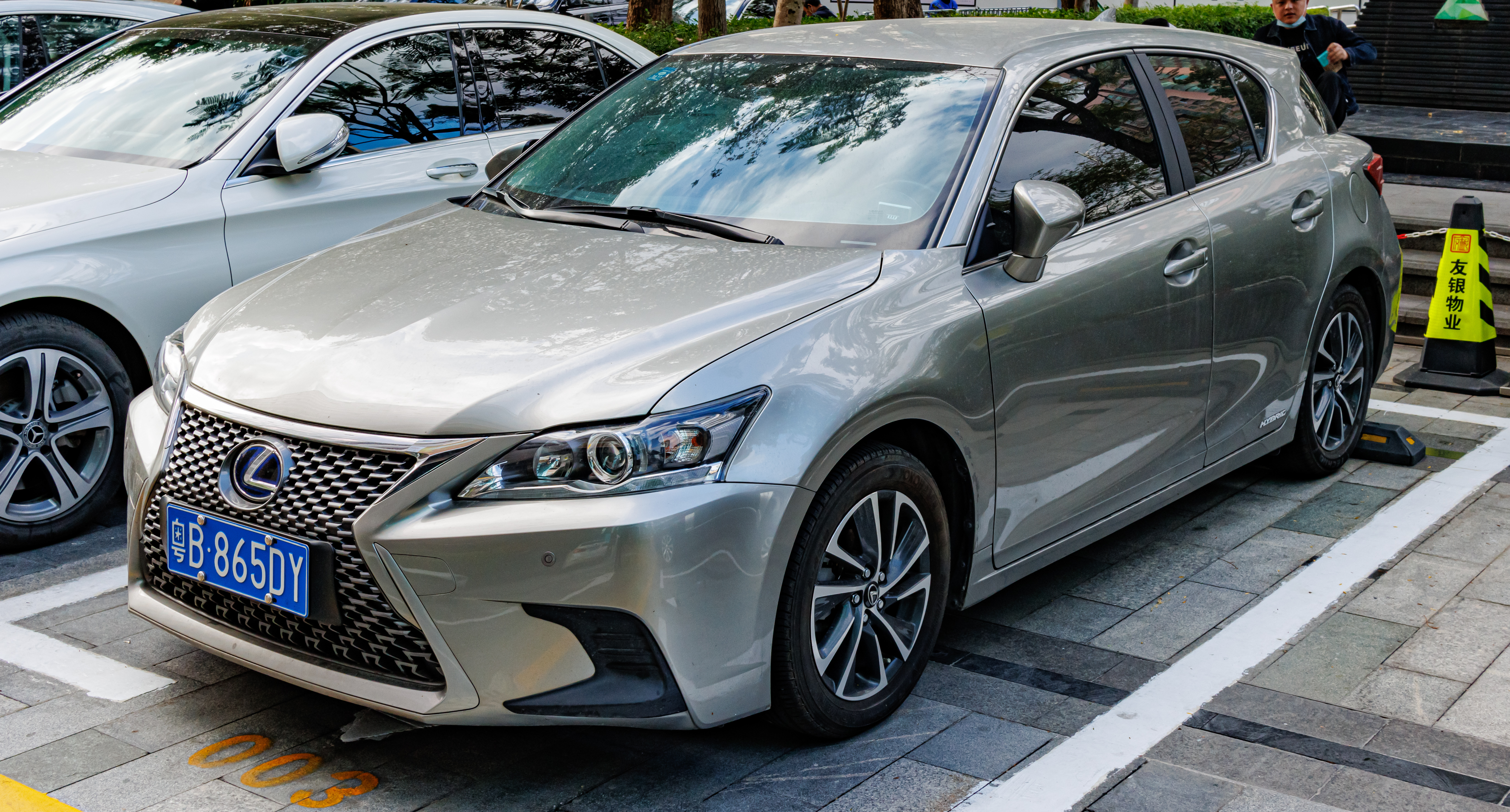
2011–2020
雷克萨斯CT
Lexus CT

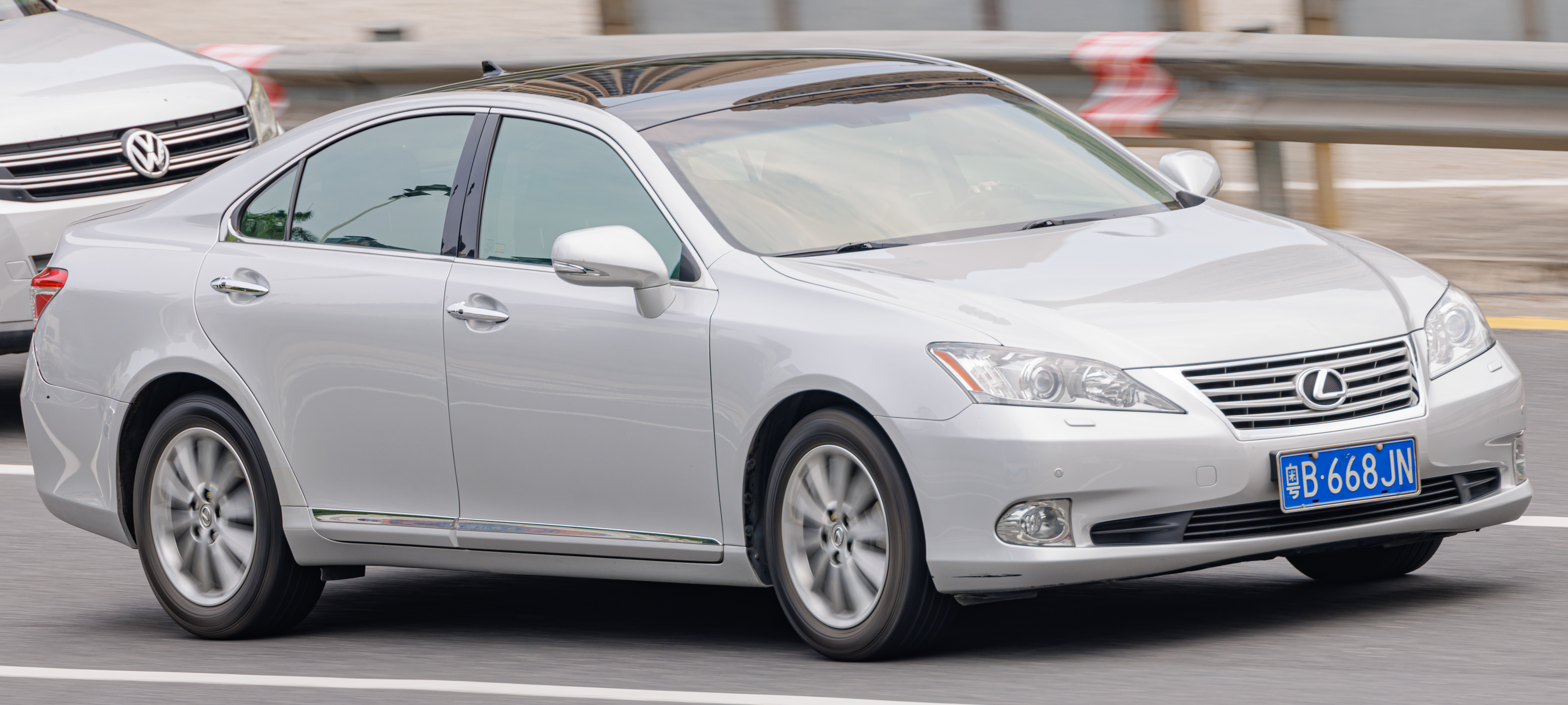
2006–2012
雷克萨斯ES XV40
Lexus ES XV40

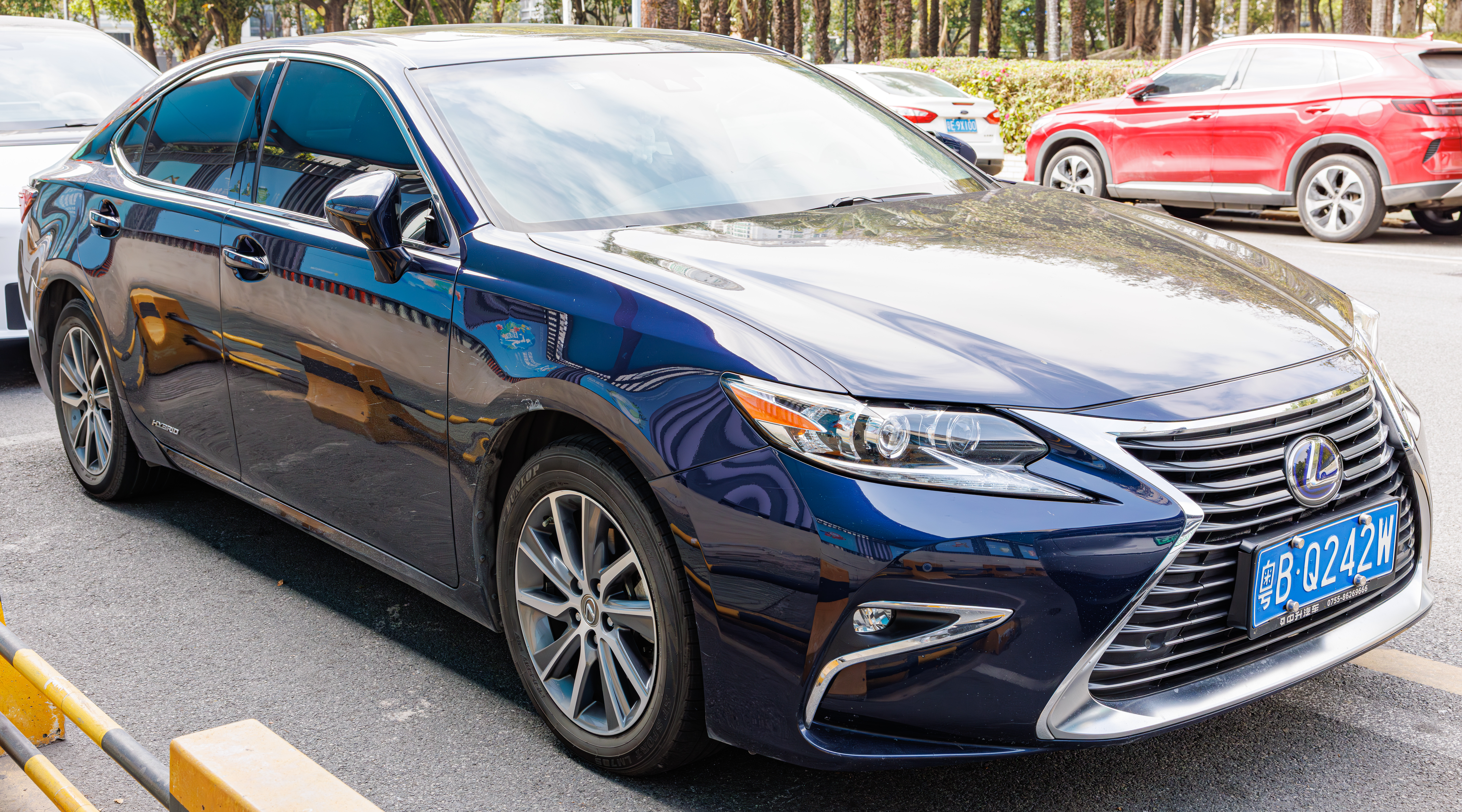
2012–2018
雷克萨斯ES XV60
Lexus ES XV60

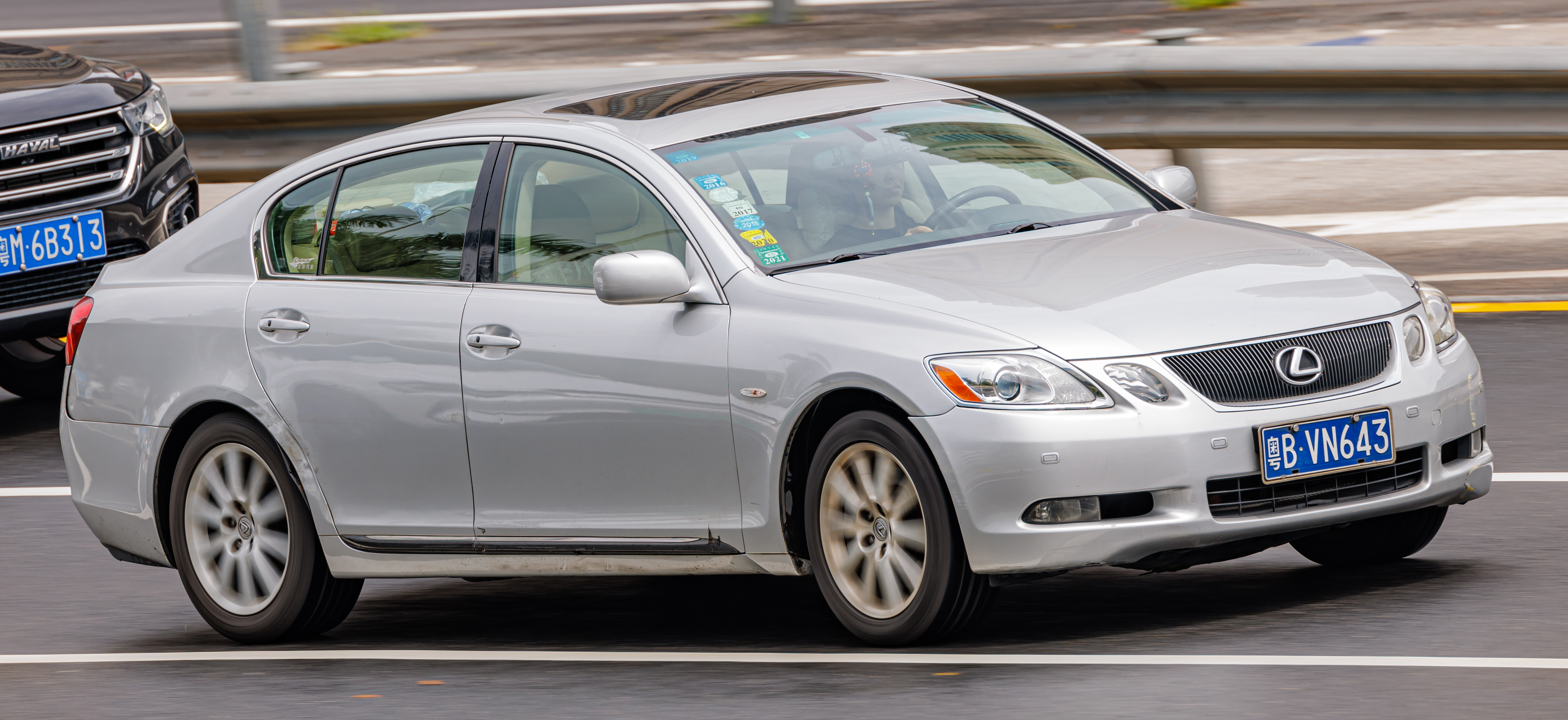
2006–2011
雷克萨斯GS S190
Lexus GS S190

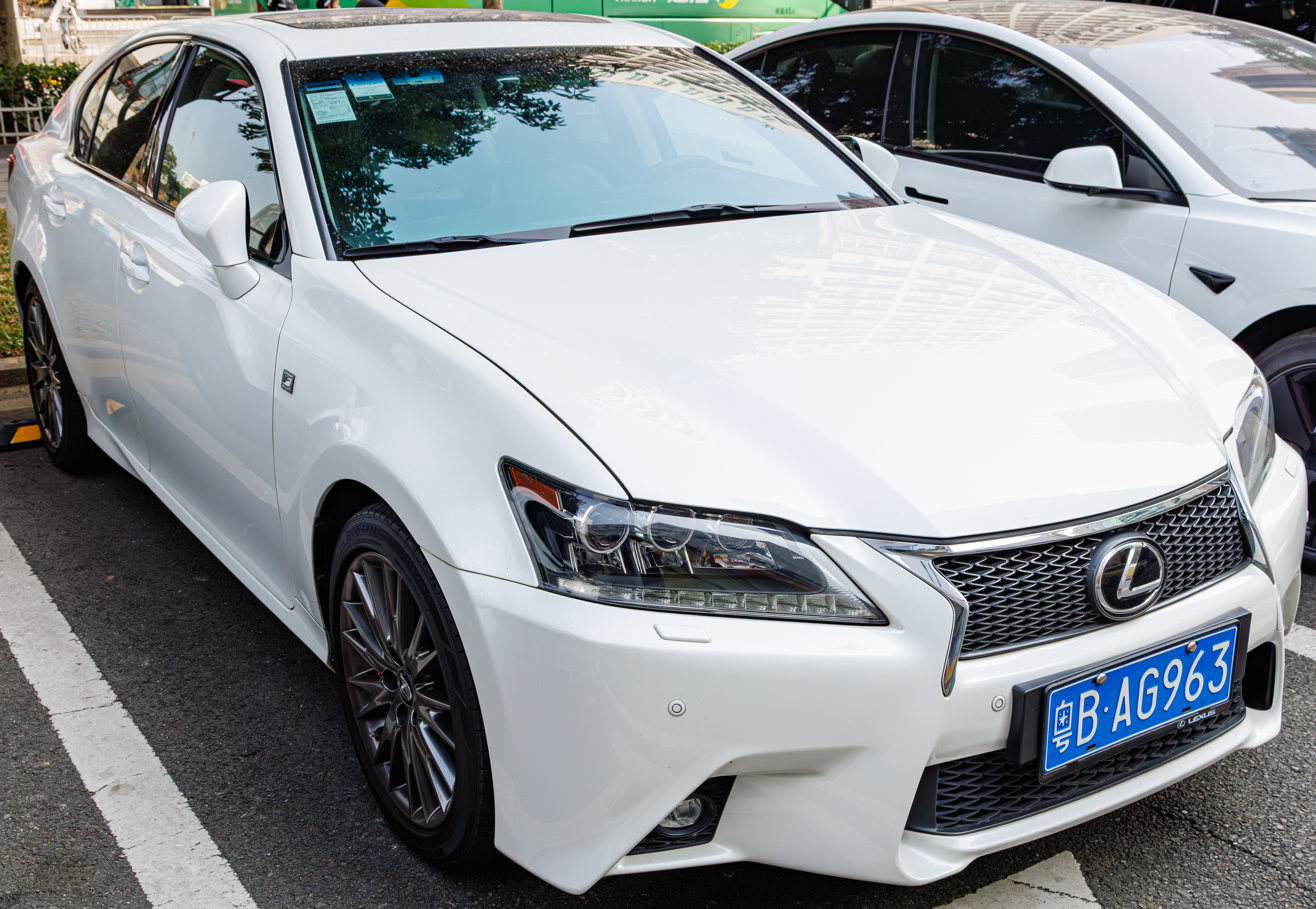
2011–2016
雷克萨斯GS L10
Lexus GS L10

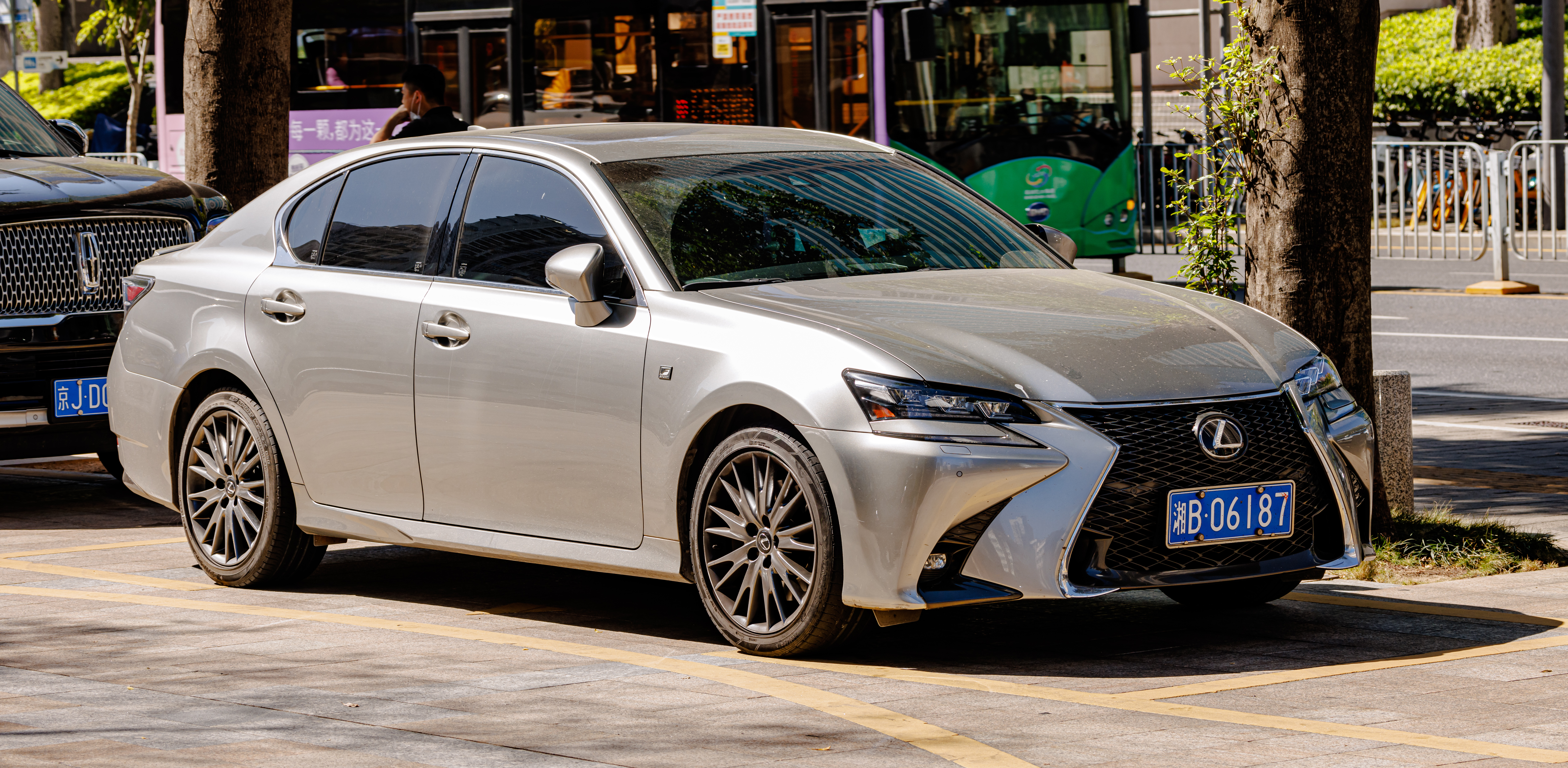
2016–2020
雷克萨斯GS L10
Lexus GS L10

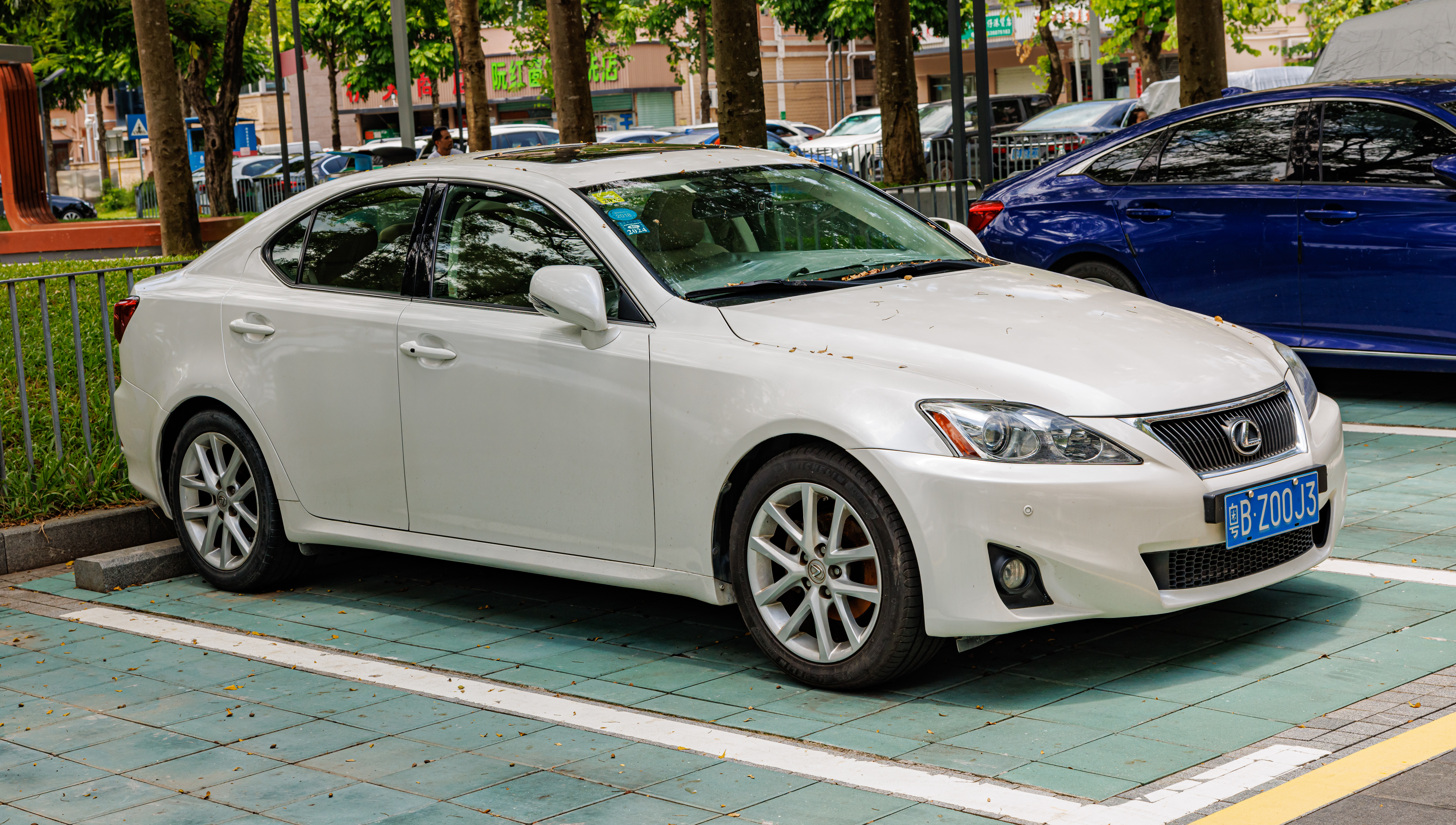
2006–2013
雷克萨斯IS XE20
Lexus IS XE20

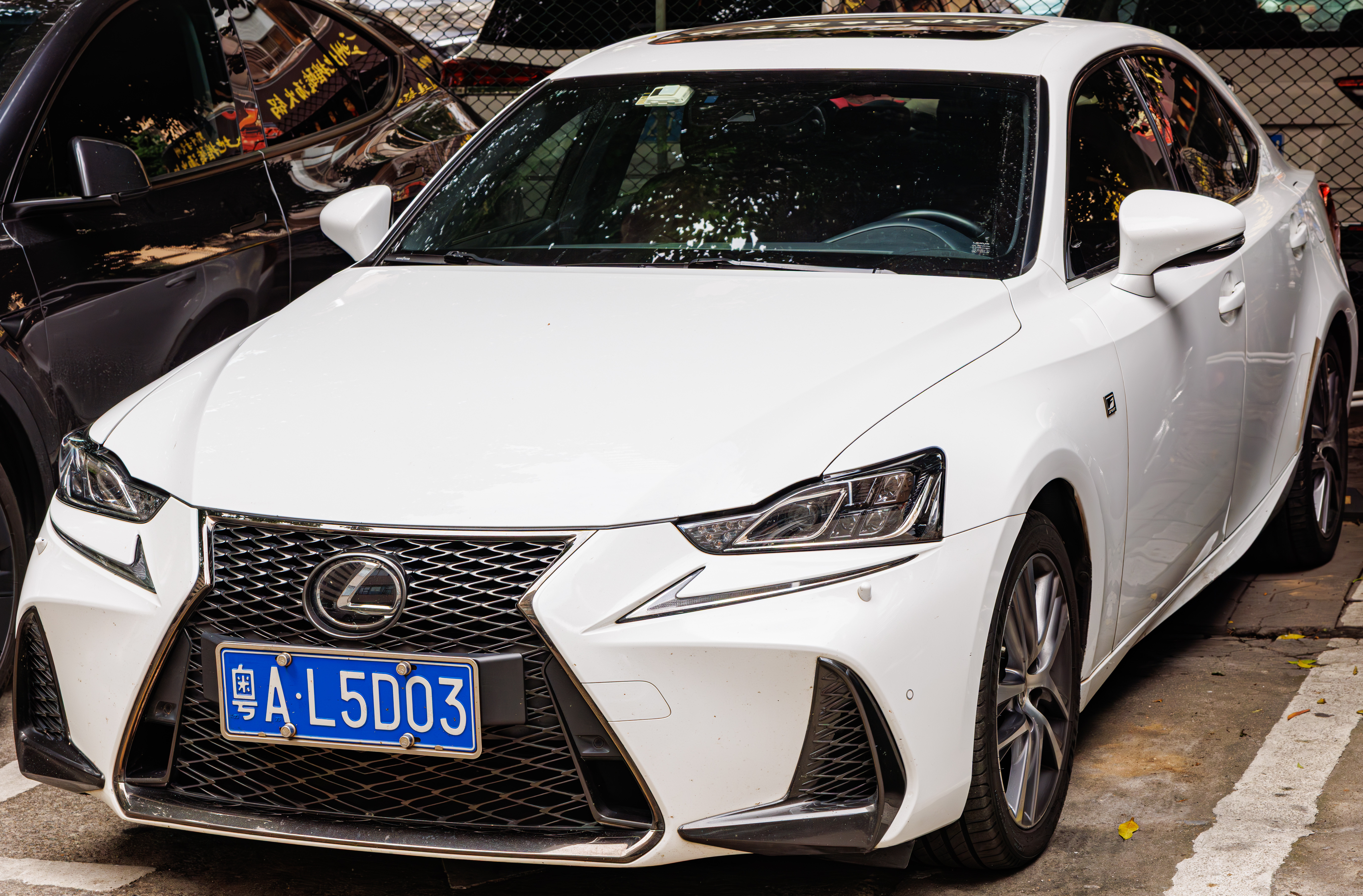
2013–2019
雷克萨斯IS XE30
Lexus IS XE30

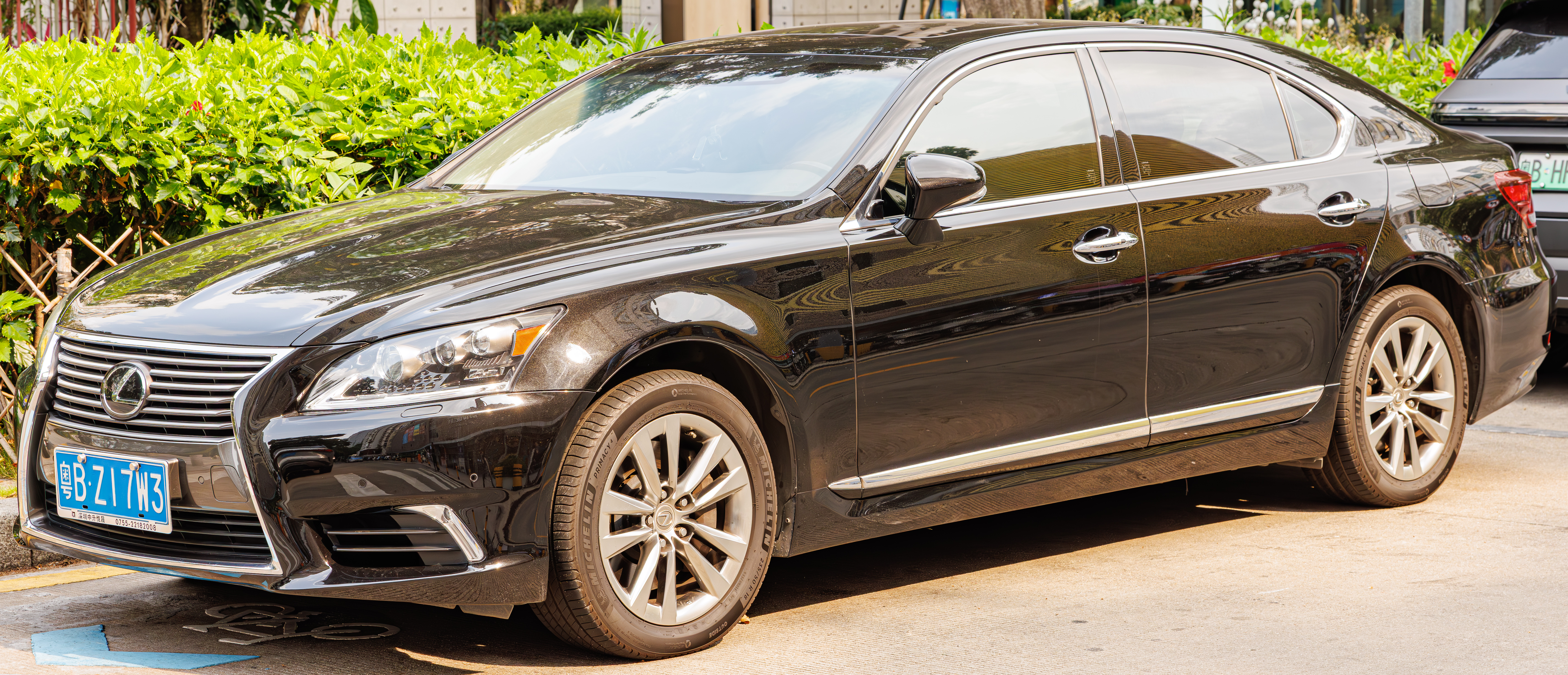
2006–2017
雷克萨斯LS XF40
Lexus LS XF40

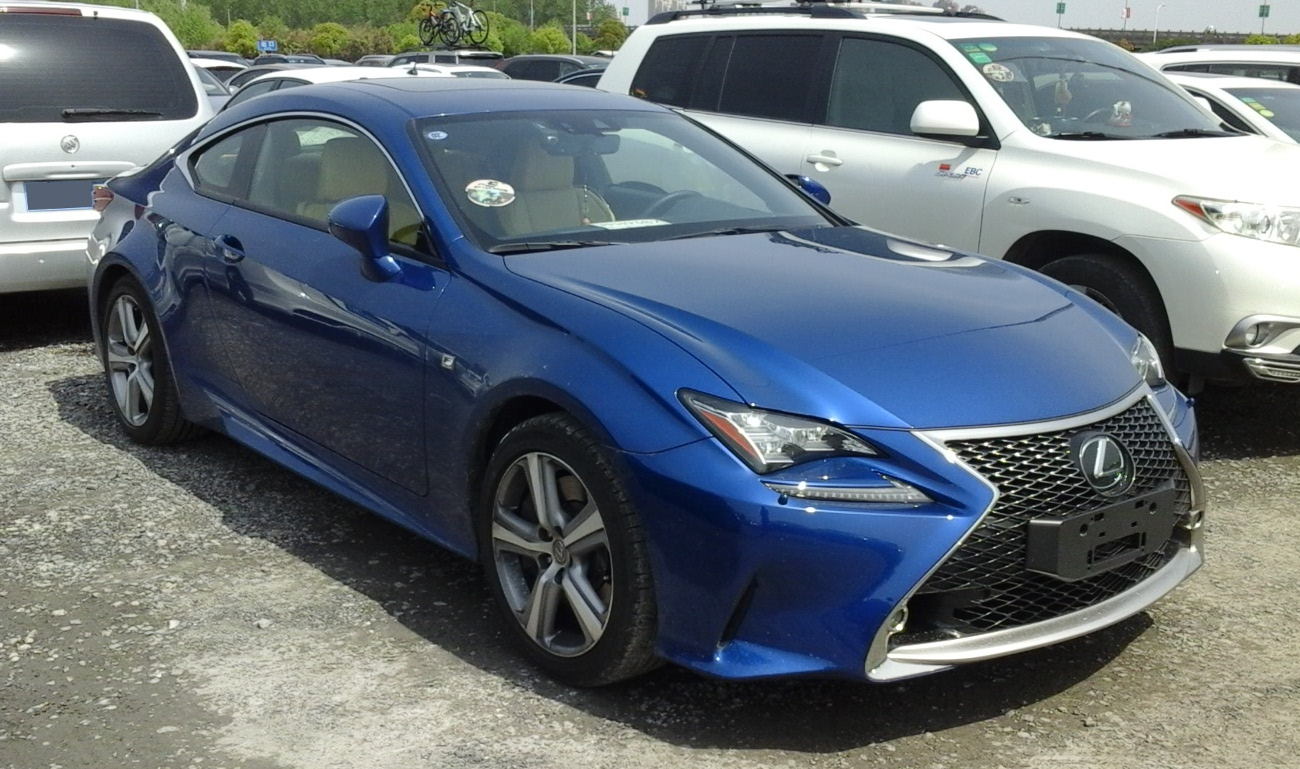
2014–2022
雷克萨斯RC
Lexus RC

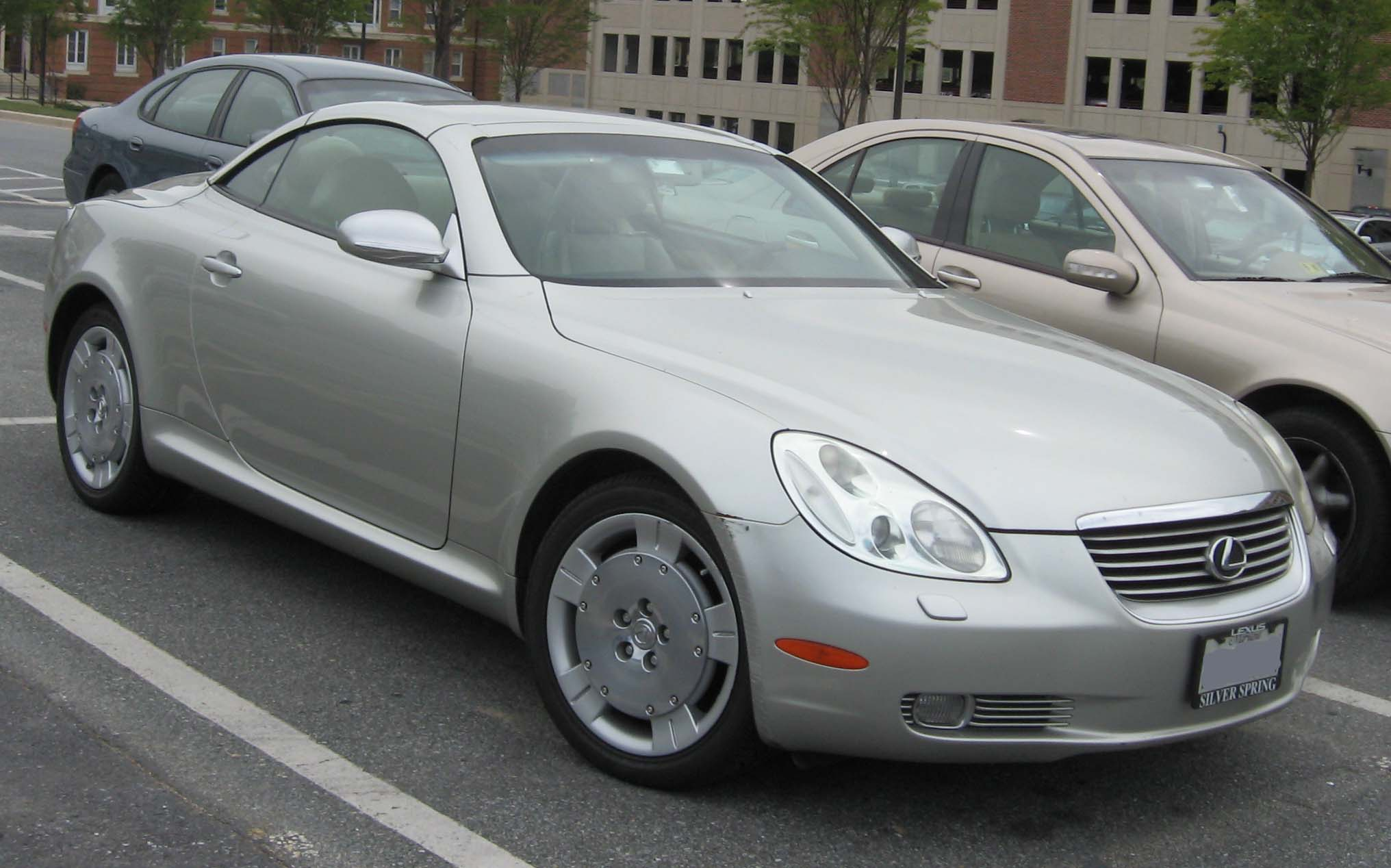
2005–2010
雷克萨斯SC
Lexus SC

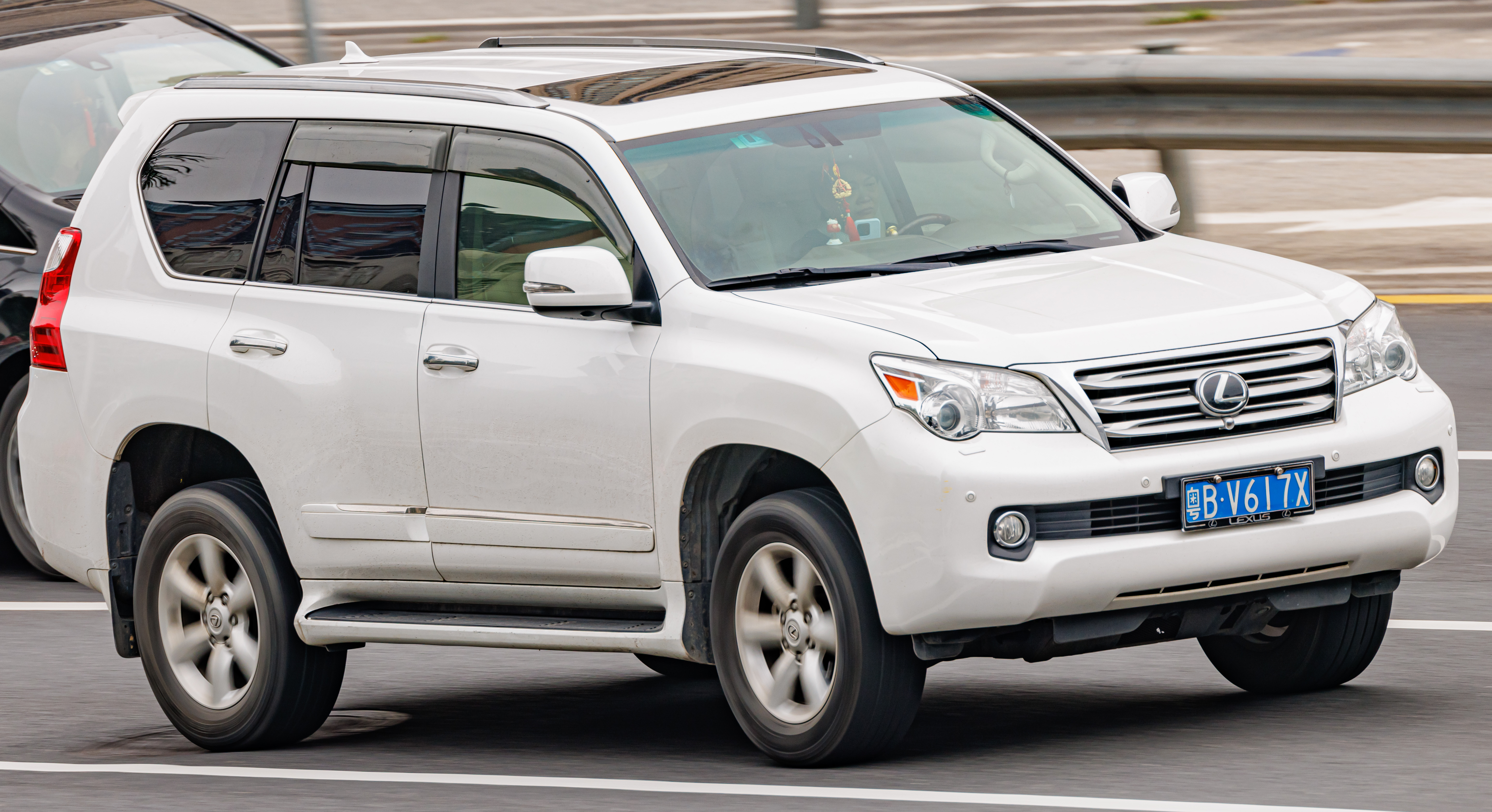
2010–2014
雷克萨斯GX J150
Lexus GX J150

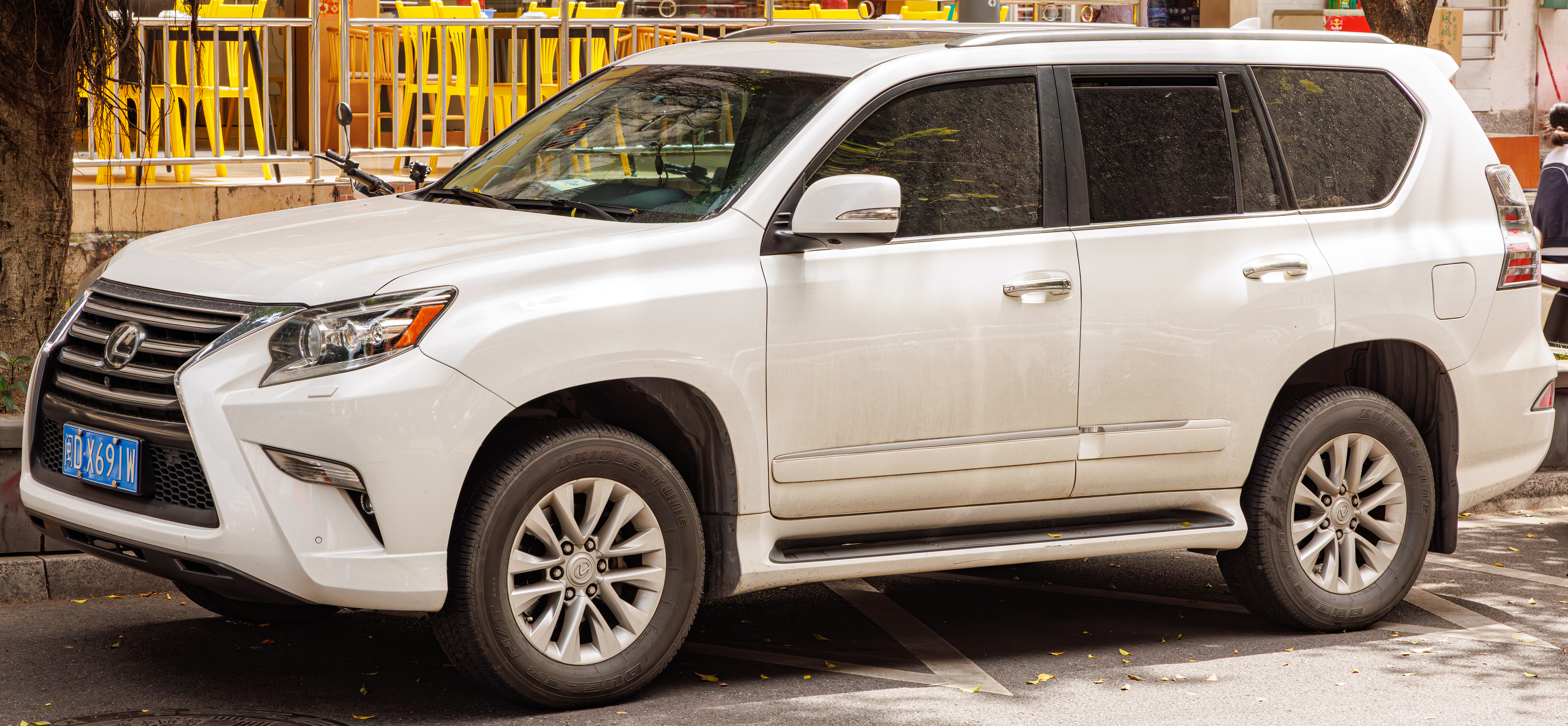
2014–2019
雷克萨斯GX J150
Lexus GX J150

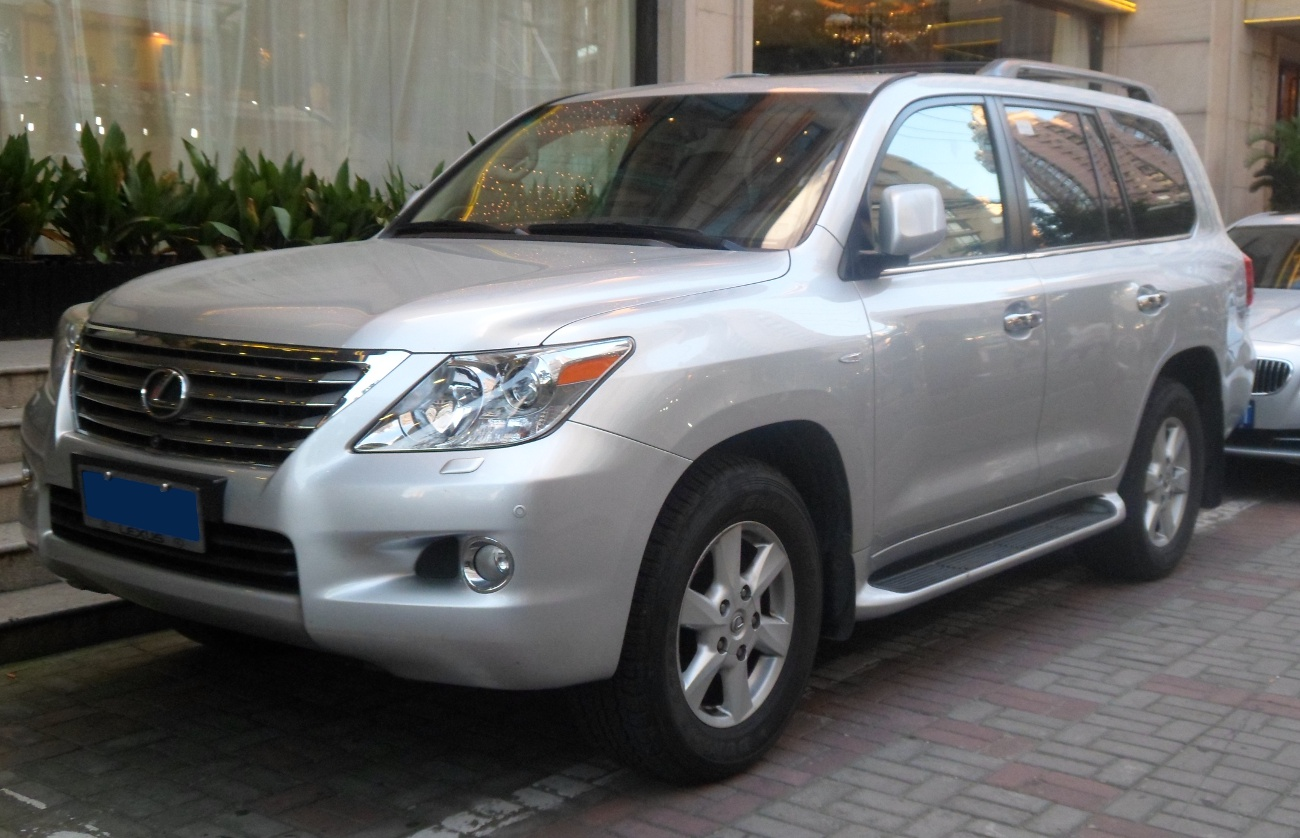
2008–2012
雷克萨斯LX J200
Lexus LX J200

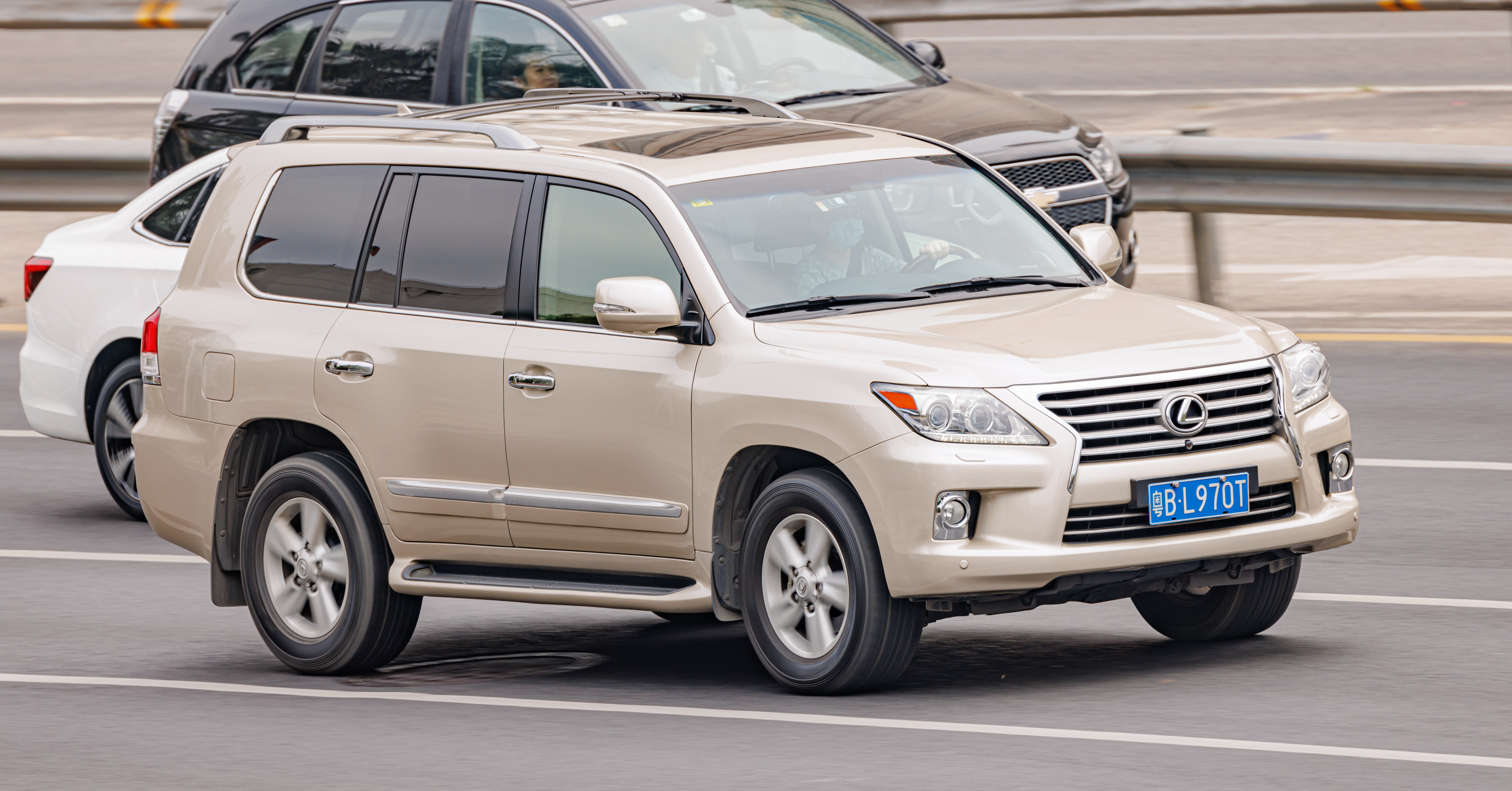
2012–2015
雷克萨斯LX J200
Lexus LX J200

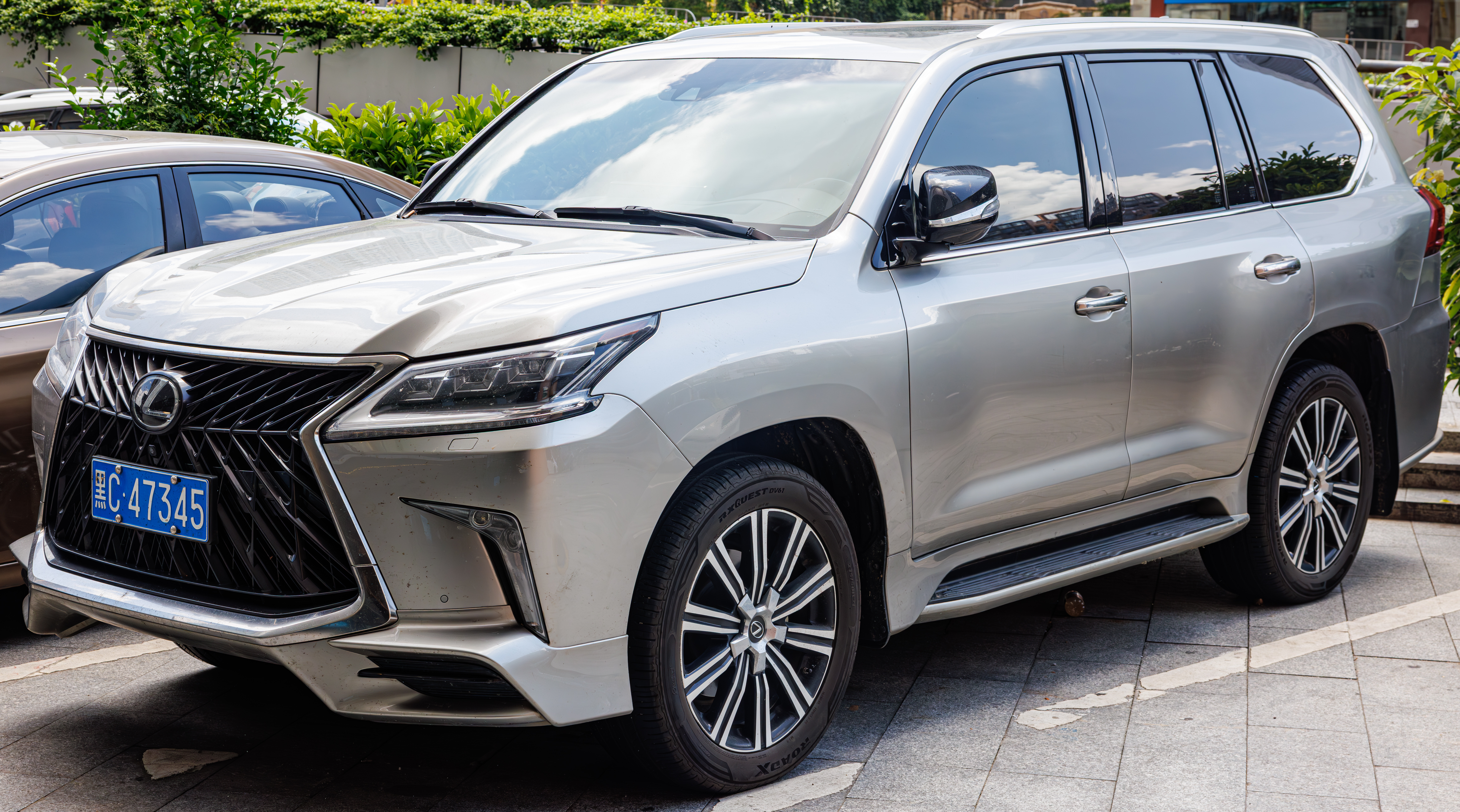
2015–2020
雷克萨斯LX J200
Lexus LX J200

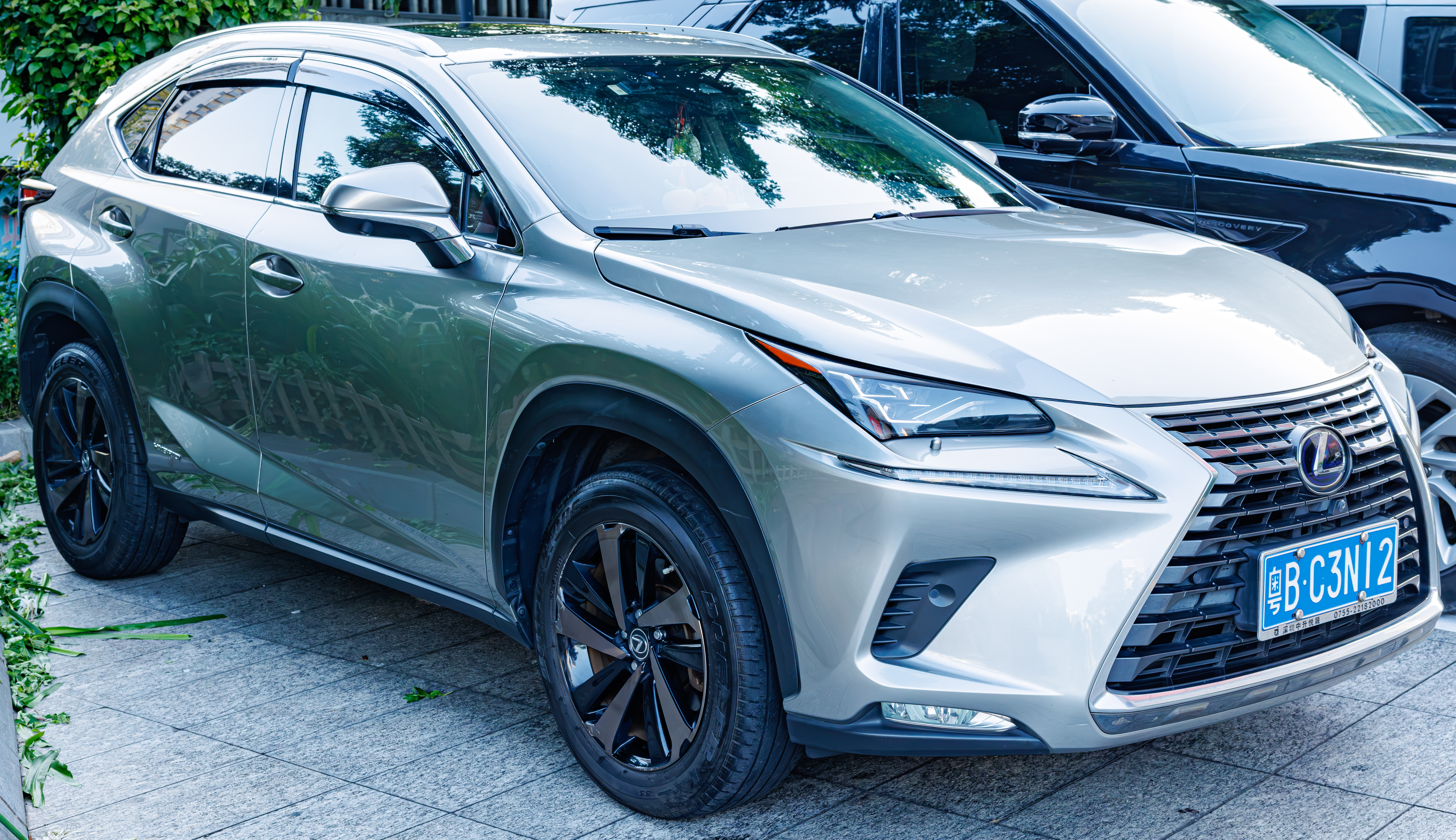
2014–2021
雷克萨斯NX AZ10
Lexus NX AZ10

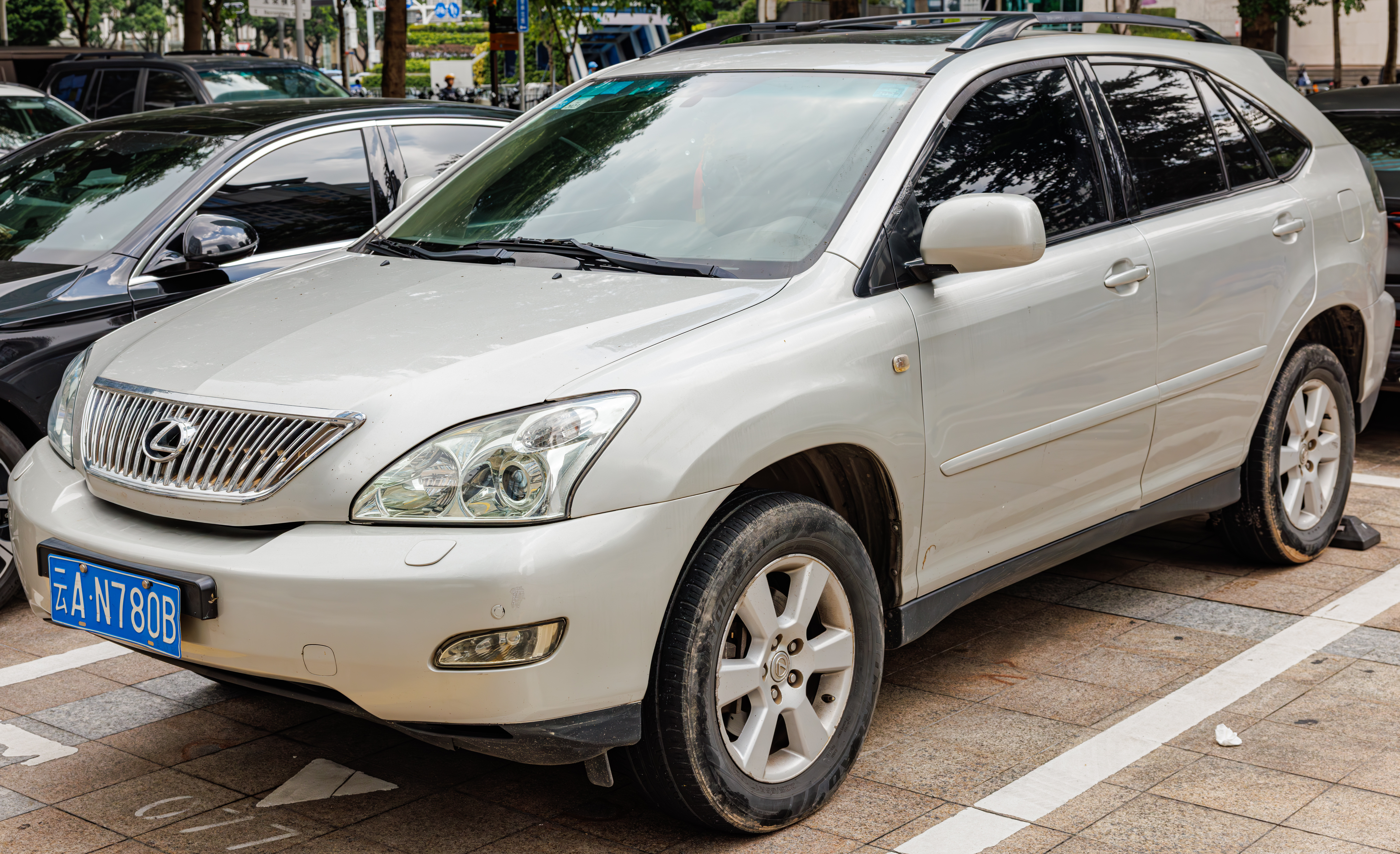
2005–2008
雷克萨斯RX XU30
Lexus RX XU30

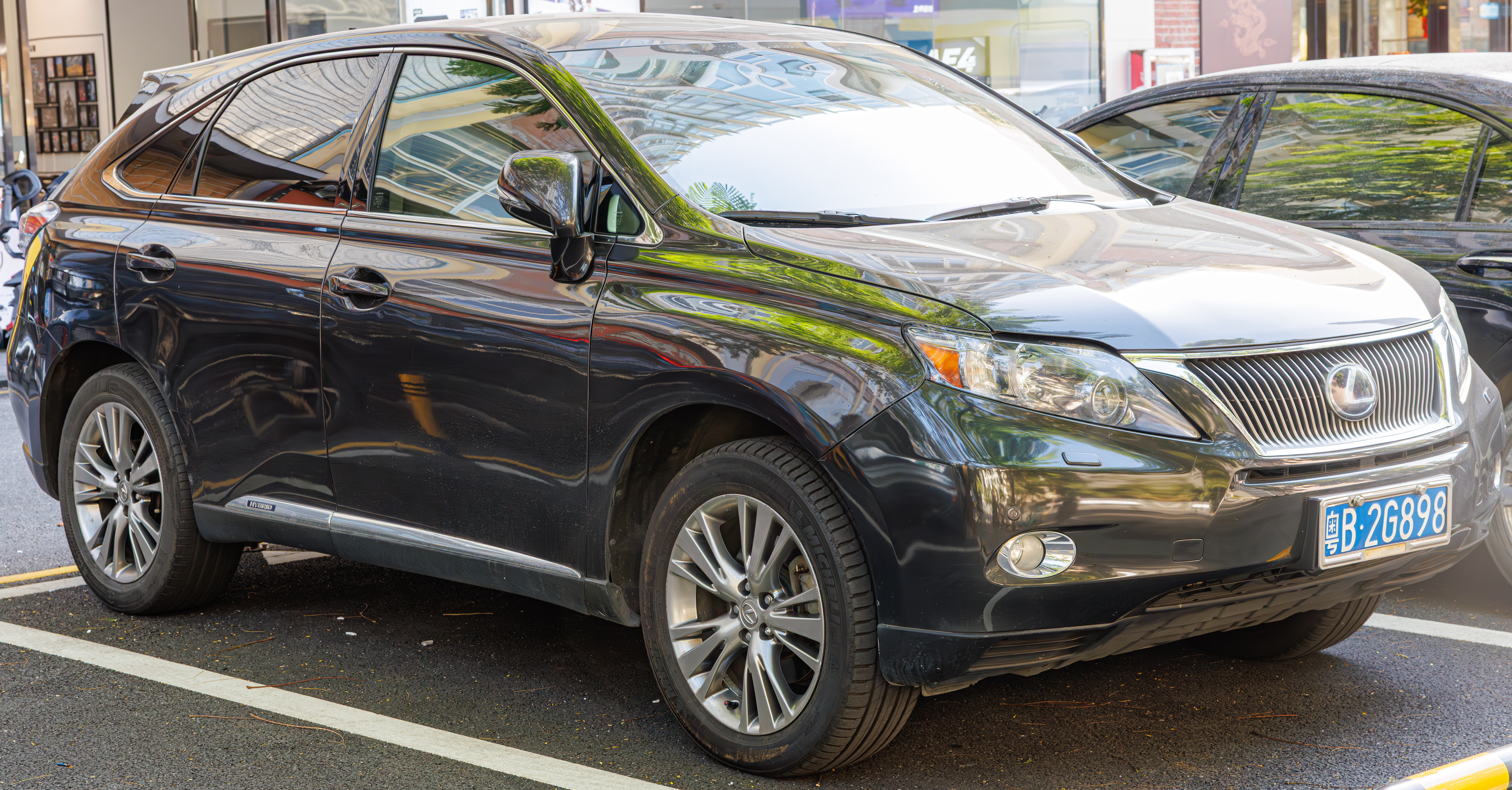
2008–2012
雷克萨斯RX AL10
Lexus RX AL10

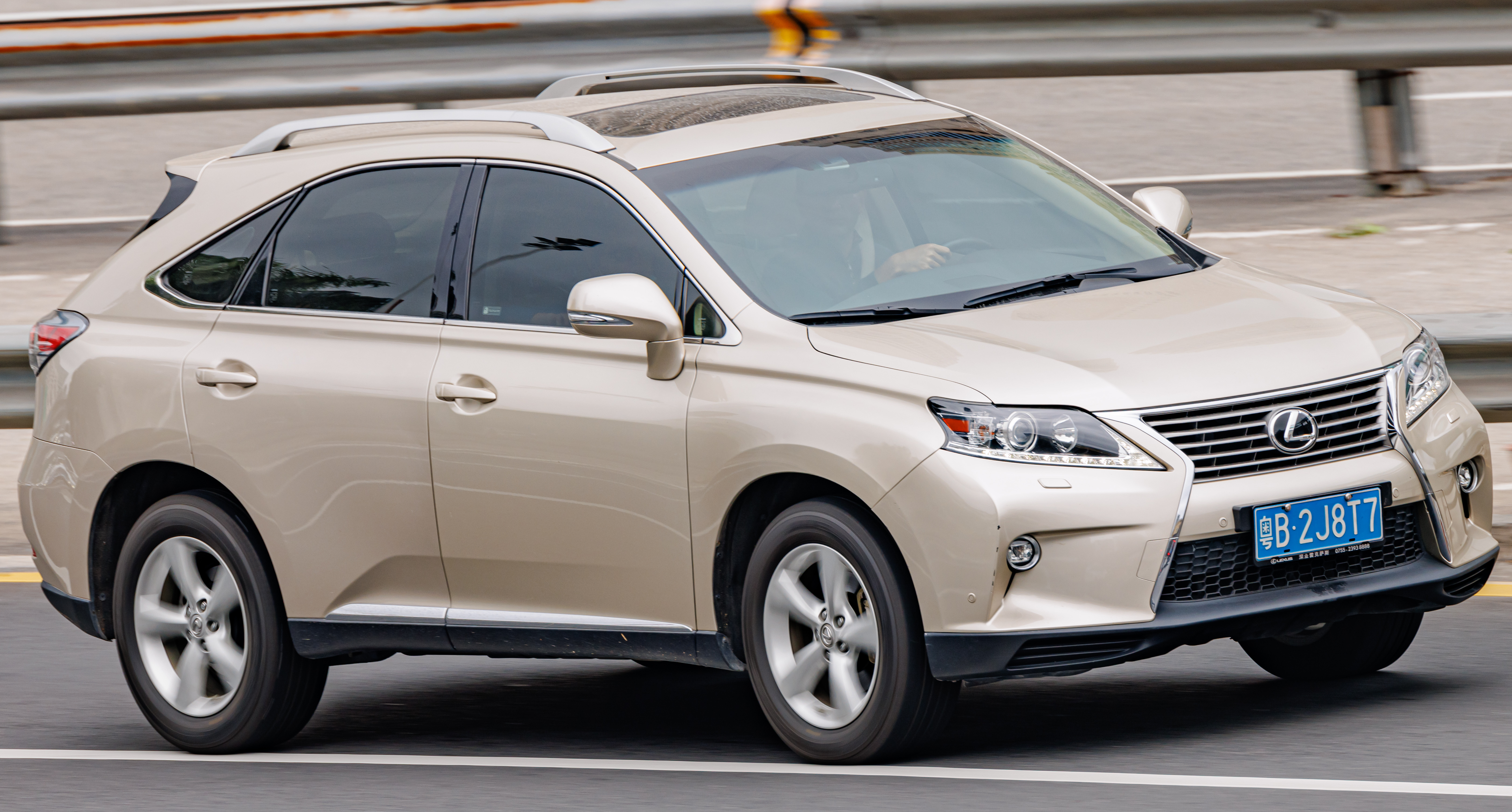
2012–2015
雷克萨斯RX AL10
Lexus RX AL10

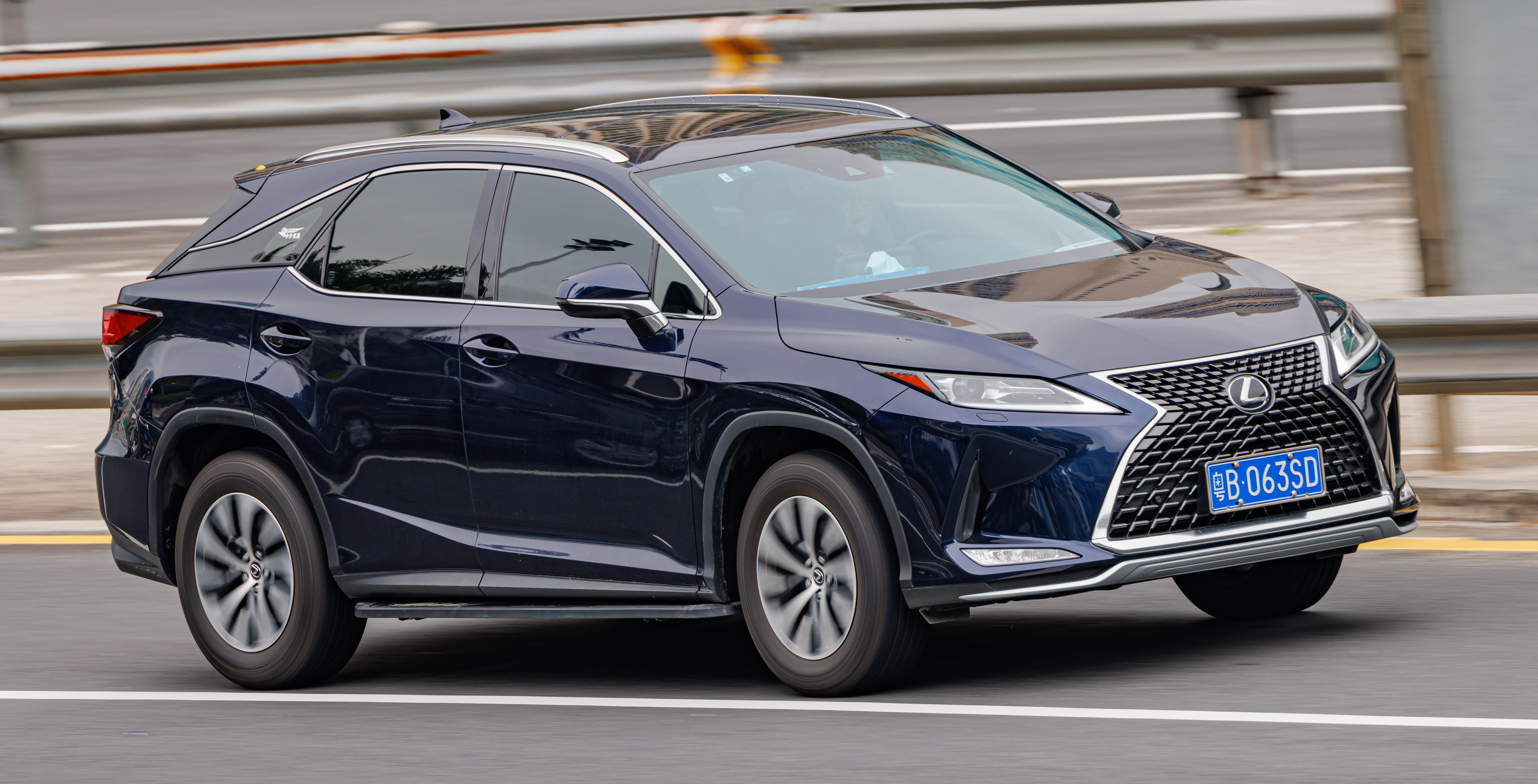
2015–2022
雷克萨斯RX AL20
Lexus RX AL20

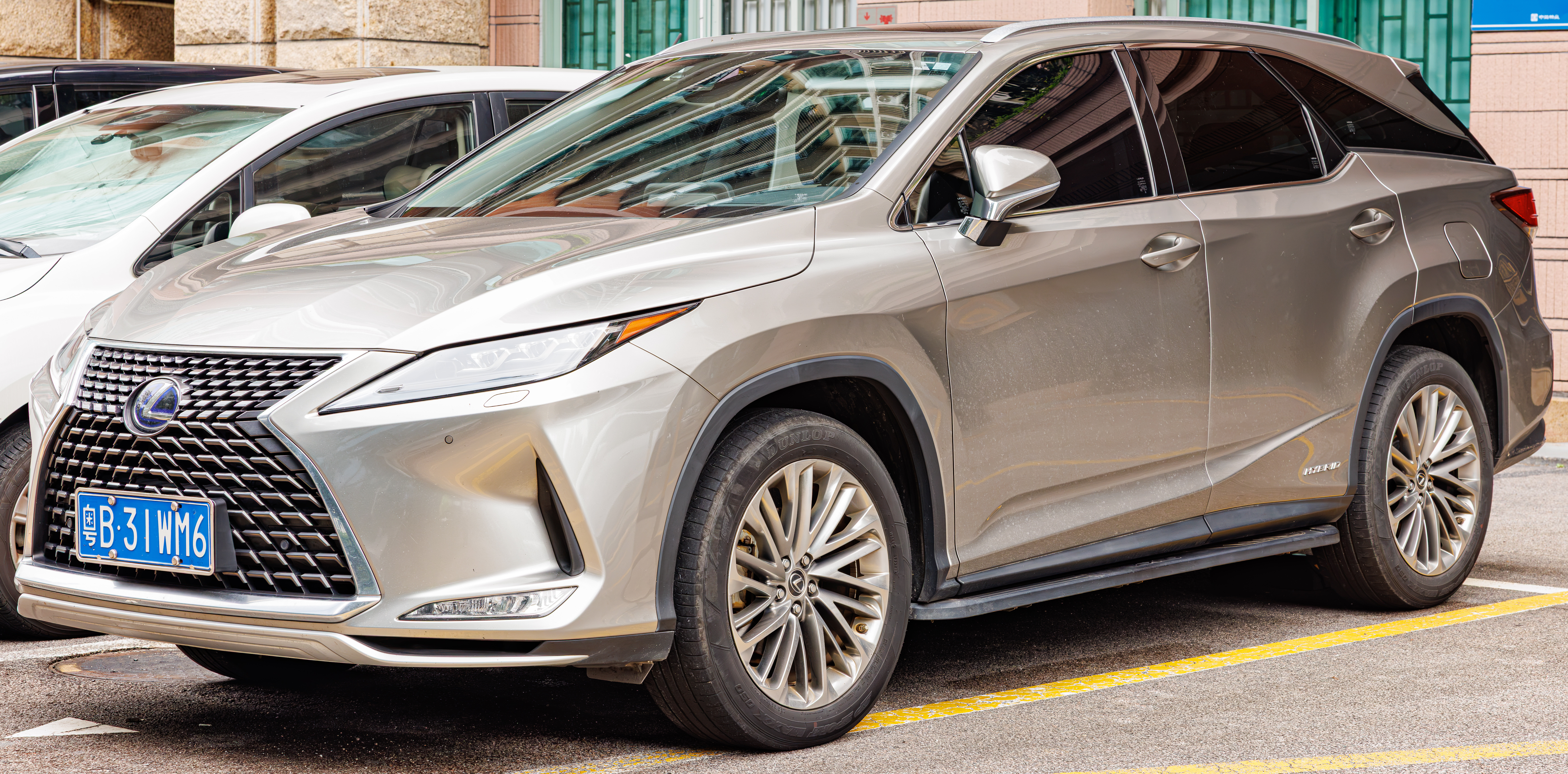
2019–2022
雷克萨斯RX L
Lexus RX L

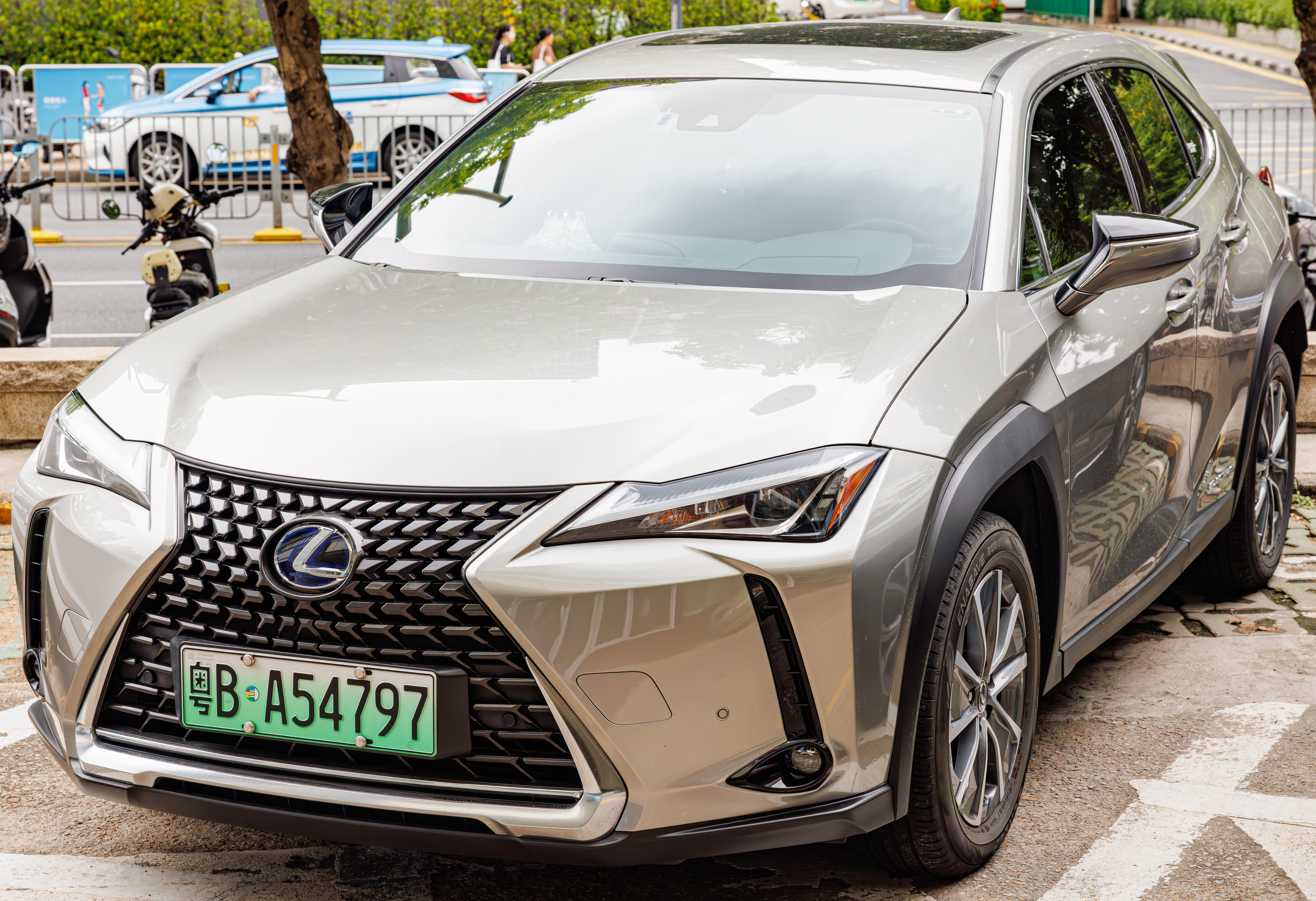
2019–2025
雷克萨斯UX
Lexus UX

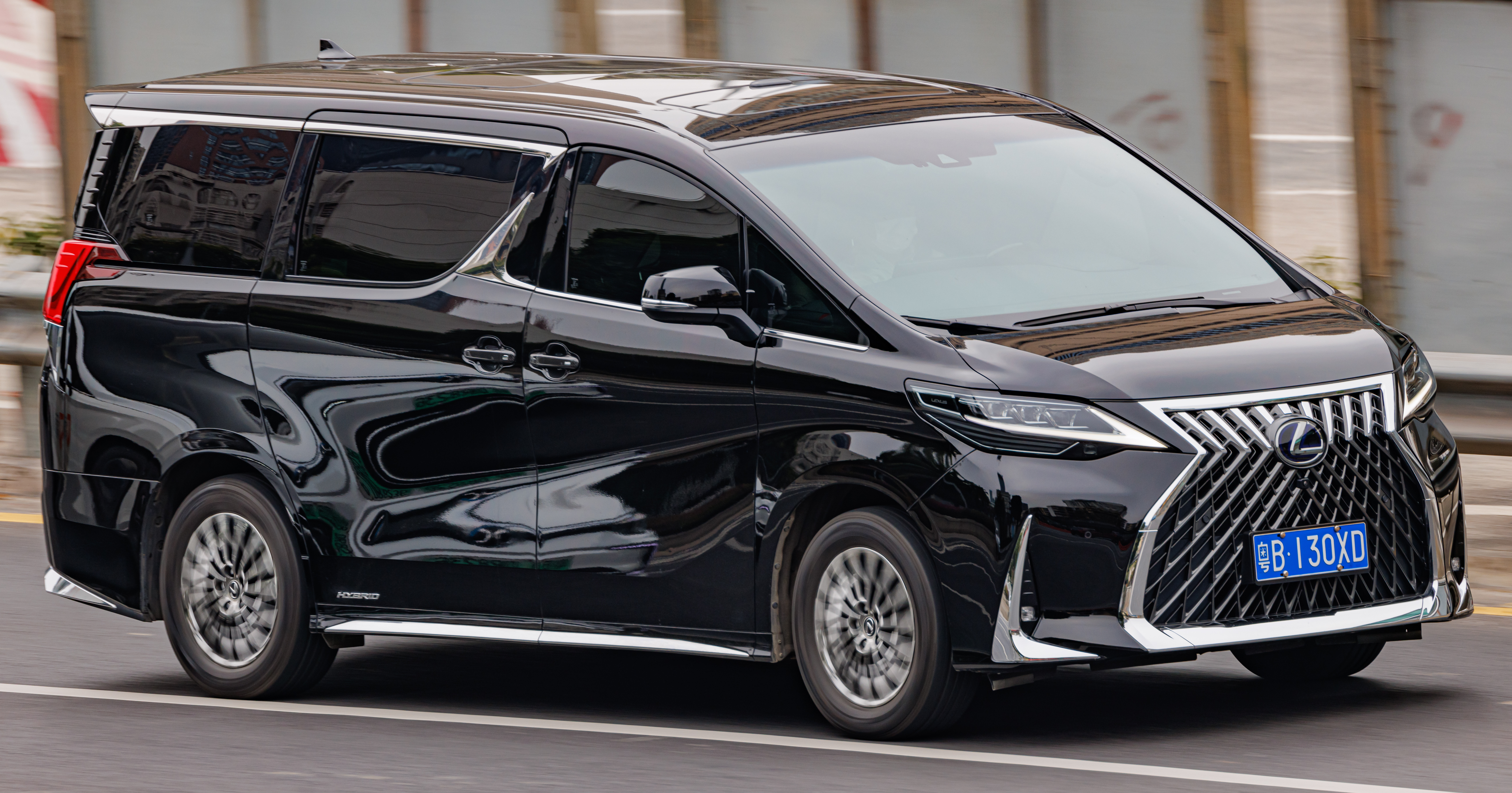
2020–2023
雷克萨斯LM AH30
Lexus LM AH30

==== Toyota Gazoo Racing (TGR) ====
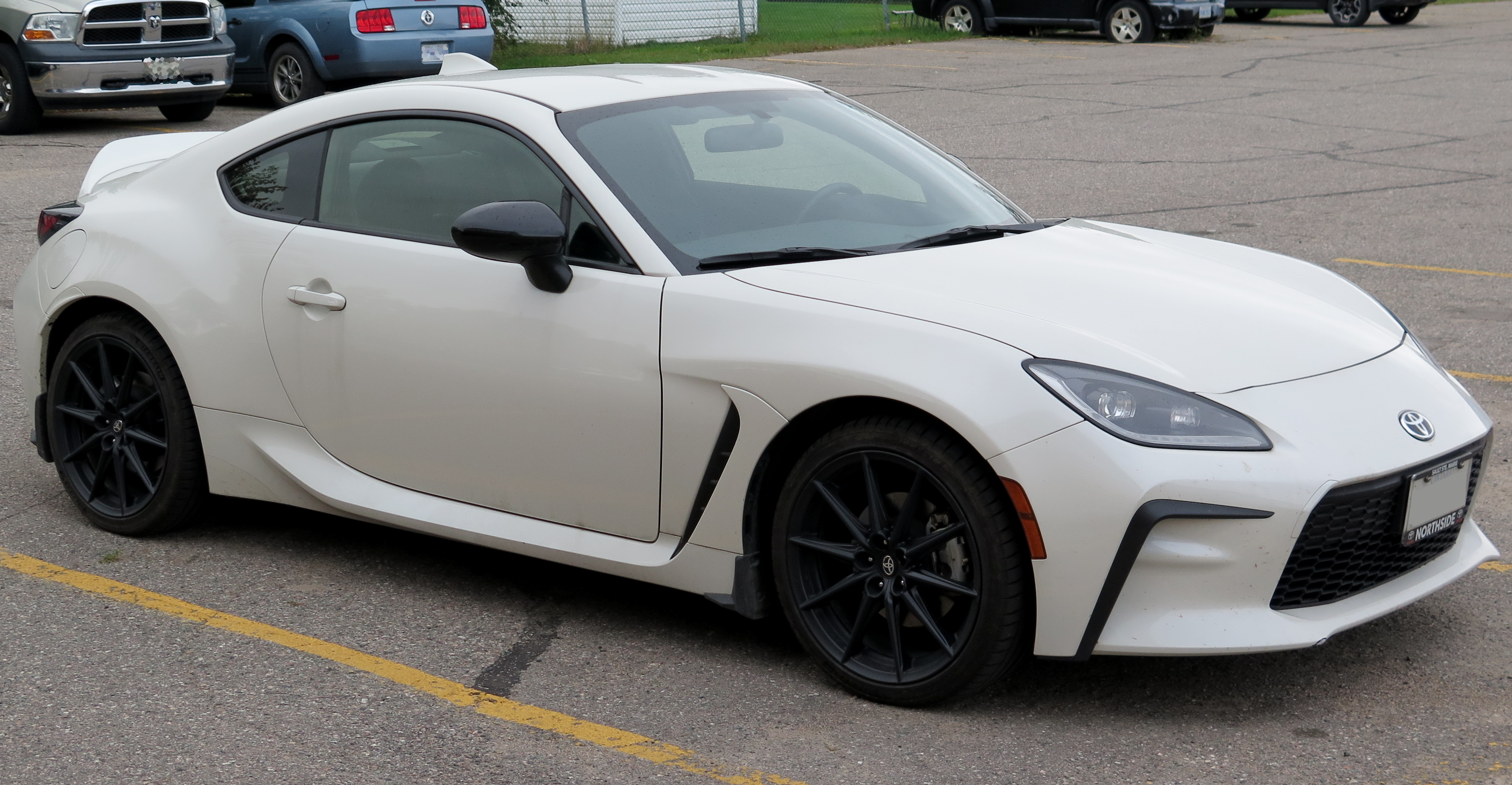
2022–2025
丰田GR86
Toyota GR86

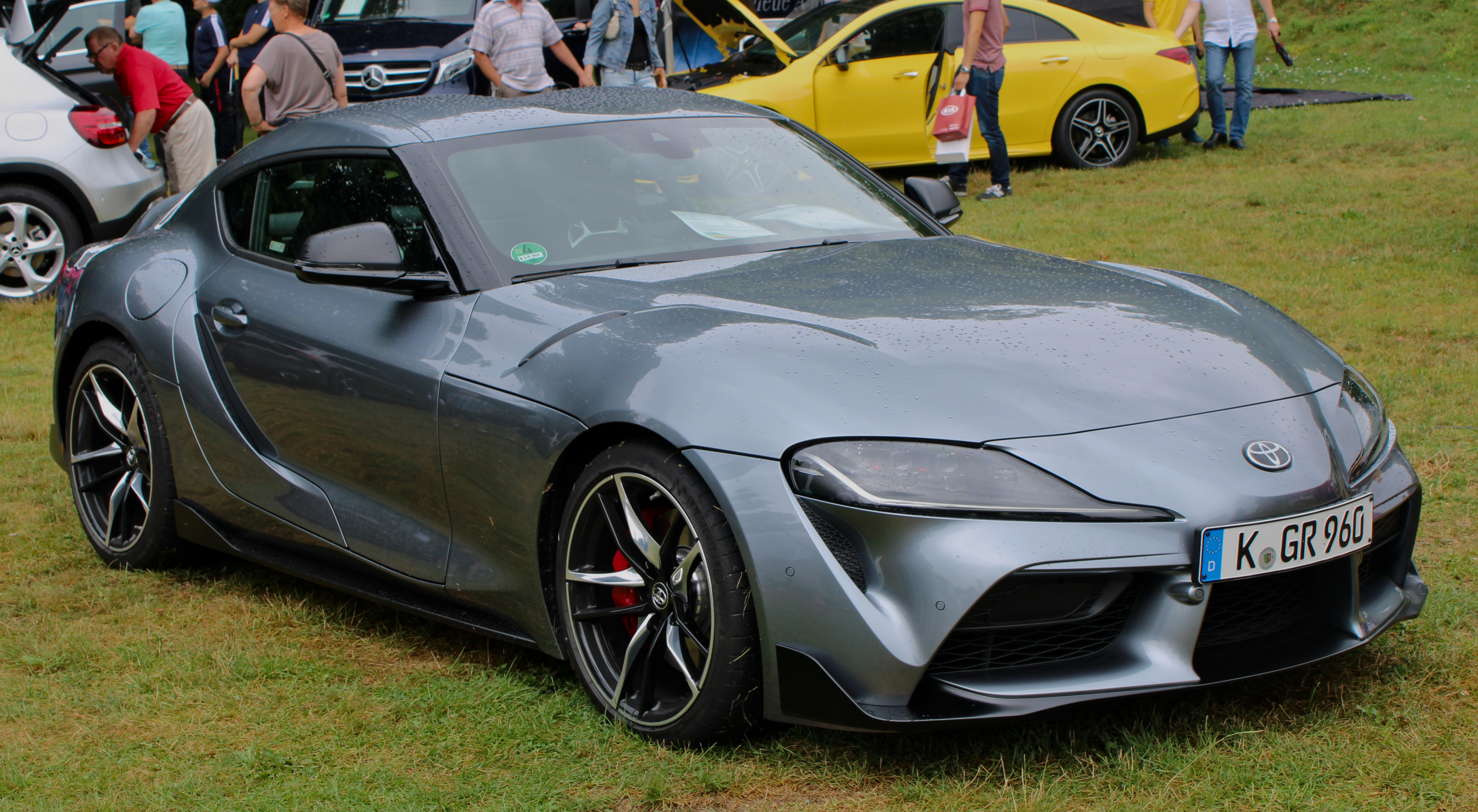
2021–2026
丰田Supra
Toyota GR Supra

== See also ==
- FAW Toyota
- GAC Toyota
