= Sailing at the 2024 Summer Olympics – Qualification =

This article details the qualifying phase for sailing at the 2024 Summer Olympics. 312 quota places for the Games are entitled to the sailors coming from their respective National Olympic Committees (NOCs), based on the results at designated regattas supervised by World Sailing. Host nation France reserves a single boat in each of the ten sailing classes, whereas four quota places (two per gender) are distributed to the NOCs competing in the men's singlehander ILCA 7 and women's singlehander ILCA 6 under the Tripartite Commission.

The qualification period commenced at the 2023 Sailing World Championships in The Hague, Netherlands, where 107 places, about forty percent of the total quota, will be awarded to the highest-ranked NOCs across ten different sailing classes. Subsequently, each class will award one quota place at their respective continental championship regattas (Africa, Asia, Central & South America, Europe, North America & Caribbean, and Oceania) with the exception of the ILCA classes, which will award quota places as follows. Seven places will be distributed to sailors representing the highest-finishing, not previously qualified NOCs at each of the 2024 Men's singlehander ILCA 7 and Women's singlehander ILCA 6 World Championships. Each Singlehander continental qualification event will award two quota places with the exception of Asia, which will award three quote places – one quota place at the 2023 Asian Games in China and two quota places at the Asian Olympic qualifier event in Thailand.

The remainder of the total quota places for all classes will be awarded to the eligible NOCs at the 2024 Last Chance Regatta in Hyères, France (39 boats in total) and as part of the World Sailing Emerging Nations Program (two boats per gender each in windsurfing and dinghy).

== Timeline ==
Event	Date	Venue
World Qualification Events
2023 Sailing World Championships	August 10–20, 2023	(Netherlands) The Hague
2024 ILCA 6 World Championship	January 3–10, 2024	(Argentina) Mar del Plata
2024 ILCA 7 World Championship	January 24–31, 2024	(Australia) Adelaide
Africa Qualification Events
2023 African Continental Regatta (all classes except 470)	December 1–9, 2023	(Egypt) Soma Bay
2024 470 World Championships	February 24 – March 3, 2024	(Spain) Palma de Mallorca
Asia Qualification Events
2022 Asian Games (iQFoil, Formula Kite, ILCA 6 and ILCA 7)	September 19–27, 2023	(China) Hangzhou; Competitions held in Ningbo
2023 ASAF Championships (all except iQFoil and Formula Kite)	December 10–21, 2023	(Thailand) Chon Buri
Europe Qualification Events
2023 Formula Kite European Championships	September 16–24, 2023	(United Kingdom) Portsmouth
2023 49er, 49erFX, and Nacra 17 European Championships	November 8–13, 2023	(Portugal) Vilamoura
2024 IQFoil World Championships	January 26 – February 3, 2024	(Spain) Lanzarote
2024 ILCA Senior European Championships (ILCA 6 and ILCA 7)	February 16–23, 2024	(Greece) Athens
2024 470 World Championships	February 24 – March 3, 2024	(Spain) Palma de Mallorca
North America Qualification Events
2023 Pan American Games (all classes except 470)	October 28 – November 5, 2023	(Chile) Algarrobo
2024 470 World Championships	February 24 – March 3, 2024	(Spain) Palma de Mallorca
South America Qualification Events
2023 Pan American Games (all classes except 470)	October 28 – November 5, 2023	(Chile) Algarrobo
2024 470 World Championships	February 24 – March 3, 2024	(Spain) Palma de Mallorca
Oceania Qualification Events
2023 Sail Sydney	December 9–15, 2023	(Australia) Sydney
Last Chance Regatta
2024 Semaine Olympique Française	April 18–27, 2024	(France) Hyères

== Quota places ==
Below are the number of boats. 470, 49er, 49erFX, and Nacra 17 classes consist of two crew members in each boat.

Event	2023 WC	2024 WC	AFR	ASI	EUR	NAM	SAM	OCE	2024 LCR	ENP	Hosts	UNI	Total
Men
IQFoil class	11	0	1	1	1	1	1	1	5	1	1	0	24
Formula Kite class	8	0	1	1	1	1	1	1	5	0	1	0	20
ILCA 7 class	16	7	2	3	2	2	2	2	3	1	1	2	43
49er class	10	0	1	1	1	1	1	1	3	0	1	0	20
Women
IQFoil class	11	0	1	1	1	1	1	1	5	1	1	0	24
Formula Kite class	8	0	1	1	1	1	1	1	5	0	1	0	20
ILCA 6 class	16	7	2	3	2	2	2	2	3	1	1	2	43
49er FX class	10	0	1	1	1	1	1	1	3	0	1	0	20
Mixed
470 class	8	0	1	1	1	1	1	1	4	0	1	0	19
Nacra 17 class	9	0	1	1	1	1	1	1	3	0	1	0	19

== Qualification summary ==
Nation	Men				Women				Mixed		Total	
Nation	IQFoil	Formula Kite	ILCA 7	49er	IQFoil	Formula Kite	ILCA 6	49erFX	470	Nacra 17	Boats	Athletes
Algeria	Yes										1	1
Angola			Yes						Yes		2	3
Antigua and Barbuda		Yes									1	1
Argentina	Yes		Yes		Yes	Yes	Yes			Yes	6	7
Aruba	Yes		Yes								2	2
Australia	Yes		Yes	Yes	Yes	Yes	Yes	Yes	Yes	Yes	8	11
Austria		Yes		Yes	Yes	Yes			Yes	Yes	6	9
Belgium			Yes	Yes			Yes	Yes		Yes	5	8
Bermuda							Yes				1	1
Brazil	Yes	Yes	Yes	Yes			Yes	Yes	Yes	Yes	8	12
British Virgin Islands			Yes								1	1
Canada				Yes		Yes	Yes	Yes			4	6
Cayman Islands							Yes				1	1
Chile			Yes				Yes				2	2
China	Yes	Yes		Yes	Yes	Yes	Yes	Yes	Yes	Yes	9	13
Colombia		Yes									1	1
Croatia		Yes	Yes	Yes	Yes		Yes				5	6
Cyprus		Yes	Yes		Yes		Yes				4	4
Czech Republic					Yes			Yes			2	3
Denmark	Yes		Yes	Yes			Yes	Yes		Yes	5	8
Egypt			Yes				Yes				2	2
El Salvador			Yes								1	1
Estonia			Yes		Yes						2	2
Fiji			Yes				Yes				2	2
Finland	Yes		Yes				Yes	Yes		Yes	5	7
France	Yes	Yes	Yes	Yes	Yes	Yes	Yes	Yes	Yes	Yes	10	14
Germany	Yes	Yes	Yes	Yes	Yes	Yes	Yes	Yes	Yes	Yes	10	14
Great Britain	Yes	Yes	Yes	Yes	Yes	Yes	Yes	Yes	Yes	Yes	10	14
Greece	Yes	Yes							Yes		3	4
Guatemala			Yes								1	1
Hong Kong	Yes		Yes	Yes	Yes						4	5
Hungary			Yes				Yes				2	2
India			Yes				Yes				2	2
Ireland			Yes	Yes			Yes				3	4
Israel	Yes	Yes	Yes		Yes	Yes	Yes		Yes		7	8
Italy	Yes	Yes	Yes		Yes	Yes	Yes	Yes	Yes	Yes	9	12
Japan	Yes							Yes	Yes	Yes	4	7
Kuwait							Yes				1	1
Lithuania	Yes						Yes				2	2
Malaysia			Yes				Yes				2	2
Mauritius		Yes				Yes					2	2
Mexico					Yes		Yes				2	2
Montenegro			Yes								1	1
Mozambique							Yes				1	1
Netherlands	Yes		Yes	Yes	Yes	Yes	Yes	Yes		Yes	8	11
New Zealand	Yes	Yes	Yes	Yes	Yes	Yes	Yes	Yes		Yes	9	12
Norway			Yes		Yes		Yes	Yes			4	5
Peru			Yes		Yes		Yes				3	3
Poland	Yes	Yes		Yes	Yes	Yes	Yes	Yes			7	9
Portugal			Yes			Yes	Yes		Yes		4	5
Puerto Rico			Yes								1	1
Romania							Yes				1	1
Saint Lucia			Yes								1	1
Samoa			Yes				Yes				2	2
Singapore		Yes	Yes								2	2
Slovakia	Yes										1	1
Slovenia		Yes	Yes		Yes		Yes		Yes		5	6
South Korea			Yes								1	1
Spain	Yes		Yes	Yes	Yes	Yes	Yes	Yes	Yes	Yes	9	13
Sweden			Yes		Yes		Yes	Yes	Yes	Yes	6	9
Switzerland	Yes			Yes		Yes	Yes		Yes		5	7
Thailand		Yes	Yes			Yes	Yes				4	4
Turkey			Yes		Yes	Yes	Yes		Yes	Yes	6	8
United States	Yes	Yes		Yes	Yes	Yes	Yes	Yes	Yes	Yes	9	13
Uruguay				Yes			Yes				2	3
Total: 65 NOCs	24	20	43	20	24	20	43	20	19	19	252	330

== Men's events ==
=== Men's windsurfer – IQFoil ===
#	Nation	Event	Rank	Qualified sailor	Selected sailor
1	France	Host nation	—N/a		Nicolas Goyard
2	Netherlands	2023 World Championships	1	Luuc van Opzeeland	Luuc van Opzeeland
3	Germany	2023 World Championships	2	Sebastian Kördel	Sebastian Kördel
4	Italy	2023 World Championships	3	Nicolò Renna	Nicolò Renna
5	Great Britain	2023 World Championships	5	Sam Sills	Sam Sills
6	Israel	2023 World Championships	6	Yoav Omer	Tom Reuveny
7	New Zealand	2023 World Championships	7	Josh Armit	Josh Armit
8	Australia	2023 World Championships	9	Grae Morris	Grae Morris
9	Spain	2023 World Championships	11	Ignacio Baltasar	Ignacio Baltasar
10	Poland	2023 World Championships	13	Paweł Tarnowski	Paweł Tarnowski
11	Brazil	2023 World Championships	16	Mateus Isaac	Mateus Isaac
12	Switzerland	2023 World Championships	21	Elia Colombo	Elia Colombo
13	China	2022 Asian Games	1	Bi Kun	Huang Jingye
14	Aruba	2023 Pan American Games (NAM)	2	Ethan Westera	Ethan Westera
15	Argentina	2023 Pan American Games (SAM)	4	Francisco Saubidet	Francisco Saubidet
16	Algeria	2023 African Regatta	1	Rami Boudrouma	Rami Boudrouma
—		2023 Sail Sydney (Oceania)			
17	Denmark	2024 World Championships (Europe)	17	Johan Søe	Johan Søe
18	Japan	2024 Last Chance Regatta	1	Makoto Tomizawa	Makoto Tomizawa
19	United States	2024 Last Chance Regatta	2	Noah Lyons	Noah Lyons
20	Greece	2024 Last Chance Regatta	3	Byron Kokkalanis	Byron Kokkalanis
21	Lithuania	2024 Last Chance Regatta	4	Rytis Jasiūnas	Rytis Jasiūnas
22	Hong Kong	2024 Last Chance Regatta	5	Cheng Ching Yin	Cheng Ching Yin
23	Slovakia	Emerging Nations Program	8	Robert Kubín	Robert Kubín
24	Finland	Developing Nations Program Reallocation	7	Jakob Eklund	Jakob Eklund

=== Men's kite – Formula Kite ===
#	Nation	Event	Rank	Qualified sailor	Selected sailor
1	France	Host nation	—N/a		Axel Mazella
2	Singapore	2023 World Championships	1	Maximilian Maeder	Maximilian Maeder
3	Slovenia	2023 World Championships	2	Toni Vodišek	Toni Vodišek
4	Austria	2023 World Championships	4	Valentin Bontus	Valentin Bontus
5	Italy	2023 World Championships	5	Riccardo Pianosi	Riccardo Pianosi
6	Cyprus	2023 World Championships	6	Denis Taradin	Denis Taradin
7	China	2023 World Championships	7	Huang Qibin	Huang Qibin
8	Croatia	2023 World Championships	8	Martin Dolenc	Martin Dolenc
9	Brazil	2023 World Championships	9	Bruno Lobo	Bruno Lobo
10	Germany	2023 European Championships	4	Jannis Maus	Jannis Maus
11	Thailand	2022 Asian Games	3	Jonathan Weston	Jonathan Weston
12	Antigua and Barbuda	2023 Pan American Games (NAM)	2	Tiger Tyson	Tiger Tyson
13	Colombia	2023 Pan American Games (SAM)	6	Victor Bolaños	Victor Bolaños
14	Mauritius	2023 African Regatta	1	Jean Lauri Fenouillot	Jean Lauri Fenouillot
15	New Zealand	2023 Sail Sydney (Oceania)	2	Lukas Walton-Keim	Lukas Walton-Keim
16	Great Britain	2024 Last Chance Regatta	1	Connor Bainbridge	Connor Bainbridge
17	Poland	2024 Last Chance Regatta	2	Maksymilian Żakowski	Maksymilian Żakowski
18	United States	2024 Last Chance Regatta	4	Markus Edegran	Markus Edegran
19	Greece	2024 Last Chance Regatta	5	Kameron Maramenidis	Kameron Maramenidis
20	Israel	2024 Last Chance Regatta	6	Dor Zarka	Dor Zarka

=== Men's One-Person Dinghy – ILCA 7 ===
#	Nation	Event	Rank	Qualified sailor	Selected sailor
1	France	Host nation	—N/a		Jean-Baptiste Bernaz
2	Australia	2023 World Championships	1	Matthew Wearn	Matthew Wearn
3	Great Britain	2023 World Championships	2	Michael Beckett	Michael Beckett
4	New Zealand	2023 World Championships	3	George Gautrey	Tom Saunders
5	Italy	2023 World Championships	5	Lorenzo Chiavarini	Lorenzo Chiavarini
6	Cyprus	2023 World Championships	6	Pavlos Kontides	Pavlos Kontides
7	Netherlands	2023 World Championships	7	Duko Bos	Duko Bos
8	Spain	2023 World Championships	8	Joaquín Blanco	Joaquín Blanco
9	Norway	2023 World Championships	9	Hermann Tomasgaard	Hermann Tomasgaard
10	Germany	2023 World Championships	12	Philipp Buhl	Philipp Buhl
11	Peru	2023 World Championships	14	Stefano Peschiera	Stefano Peschiera
12	Belgium	2023 World Championships	15	William de Smet	William de Smet
13	Finland	2023 World Championships	18	Kaarle Tapper	Kaarle Tapper
14	Hungary	2023 World Championships	19	Jonatán Vadnai	Jonatán Vadnai
15	Croatia	2023 World Championships	21	Tonči Stipanović	Tonči Stipanović
16	Ireland	2023 World Championships	23	Finn Lynch	Finn Lynch
17	Portugal	2023 World Championships	24	Eduardo Marques	Eduardo Marques
18	Singapore	2022 Asian Games	1	Ryan Lo	Ryan Lo
19	Puerto Rico	2023 Pan American Games (NAM)	6	Pedro Luis Fernández	Pedro Luis Fernández
20	Aruba	2023 Pan American Games (NAM)	7	Just van Aanholt	Just van Aanholt
21	Argentina	2023 Pan American Games (SAM)	4	Francisco Guaragna Rigonat	Francisco Guaragna Rigonat
22	Brazil	2023 Pan American Games (SAM)	5	Bruno Fontes	Bruno Fontes
23	Egypt	2023 African Regatta	1	Aly Badawy	Aly Badawy
24	Angola	2023 African Regatta	2	Flipe Francisco Andre	Flipe Francisco Andre
25	Samoa	2023 Sail Sydney (Oceania)	6	Eroni Leilua	Eroni Leilua
26	Fiji	2023 Sail Sydney (Oceania)	22	Viliame Ratului	Viliame Ratului
27	Hong Kong	2023 ASAF Championships (Asia)	1	Nicholas Halliday	Nicholas Halliday
28	Thailand	2023 ASAF Championships (Asia)	2	Arthit Mikhail Romanyk	Arthit Mikhail Romanyk
29	Guatemala	2024 ILCA World Championships	13	Juan Ignacio Maegli	Juan Ignacio Maegli
30	Montenegro	2024 ILCA World Championships	21	Milivoj Dukić	Milivoj Dukić
31	Chile	2024 ILCA World Championships	24	Clemente Seguel	Clemente Seguel
32	Denmark	2024 ILCA World Championships	25	Johan Schubert	Johan Schubert
33	India	2024 ILCA World Championships	26	Vishnu Saravanan	Vishnu Saravanan
34	Turkey	2024 ILCA World Championships	28	Yalçın Çitak	Yalçın Çitak
—	Sweden	2024 ILCA World Championships	30	Emil Bengtson	
35	Israel	2024 ILCA European Championships	8	Omer Vilenchik	Omer Vilenchik
36	Slovenia	2024 ILCA European Championships	11	Žan Luka Zelko	Žan Luka Zelko
37	South Korea	2024 Last Chance Regatta	1	Ha Jee-min	Ha Jee-min
38	Estonia	2024 Last Chance Regatta	2	Karl-Martin Rammo	Karl-Martin Rammo
39	Malaysia	2024 Last Chance Regatta	3	Khairulnizam Mohd Afendy	Khairulnizam Mohd Afendy
40	Poland	2024 Last Chance Regatta	4	Michał Krasodomski	Michał Krasodomski
41	El Salvador	Emerging Nations Program	9	Enrique Arathoon	Enrique Arathoon
42	British Virgin Islands	Universality places	—N/a		Thad Lettsome
43	Saint Lucia	Universality places	—N/a		Luc Chevrier

=== Men's skiff – 49er ===
#	Nation	Event	Rank	Qualified sailor	Selected sailor
1	France	Host nation	—N/a		Erwan Fischer; Clément Piquin
2	Netherlands	2023 World Championships	1	Bart Lambriex; Floris van de Werken	Bart Lambriex; Floris van de Werken
3	Switzerland	2023 World Championships	2	Sébastien Schneiter; Arno De Planta	Sébastien Schneiter; Arno De Planta
4	Spain	2023 World Championships	3	Florián Trittel; Diego Botín	Florián Trittel; Diego Botín
5	New Zealand	2023 World Championships	4	Isaac McHardie; William McKenzie	Isaac McHardie; William McKenzie
6	United States	2023 World Championships	5	Andrew Mollerus; Ian MacDiarmid	Ian Barrows; Hans Henken
7	Great Britain	2023 World Championships	6	James Peters; Fynn Sterritt	James Peters; Fynn Sterritt
8	Poland	2023 World Championships	7	Łukasz Przybytek; Jacek Piasecki	Dominik Buksak; Szymon Wierzbicki
9	Croatia	2023 World Championships	8	Šime Fantela; Mihovil Fantela	Šime Fantela; Mihovil Fantela
10	Denmark	2023 World Championships	11	Frederik Rask; Jakob Precht Jensen	Nikolaj Buhl; Daniel Nyborg
11	Austria	2023 World Championships	12	Benjamin Bildstein; David Hussl	Benjamin Bildstein; David Hussl
12	Canada	2023 Pan American Games (NAM)	3	William Jones; Justin Barnes	William Jones; Justin Barnes
13	Uruguay	2023 Pan American Games (SAM)	2	Hernán Umpierre; Fernando Diz	Hernán Umpierre; Fernando Diz
14	Ireland	2023 European Championships	8	Robert Dickson; Sean Waddilove	Robert Dickson; Sean Waddilove
—		2023 African Regatta			
15	Australia	2023 Sail Sydney (Oceania)	1	Jim Colley; Shaun Connor	Jim Colley; Shaun Connor
16	China	2023 ASAF Championships (Asia)	1	Wen Zaiding; Liu Tian	Wen Zaiding; Liu Tian
17	Germany	2024 Last Chance Regatta	1	Jakob Meggendorfer; Andreas Spranger	Jakob Meggendorfer; Andreas Spranger
18	Belgium	2024 Last Chance Regatta	2	Yannick Lefèbvre; Jan Heuninck	Yannick Lefèbvre; Jan Heuninck
19	Brazil	2024 Last Chance Regatta	3	Marco Grael; Gabriel Simões	Marco Grael; Gabriel Simões
20	Hong Kong	Developing Nations Program Reallocation	7	Akira Sakai; Russell Aylsworth	Akira Sakai; Russell Aylsworth

== Women's events ==
=== Women's windsurfer – IQFoil ===
#	Nation	Event	Rank	Qualified sailor	Selected sailor
1	France	Host nation	—N/a		Hélène Noesmoen
2	Israel	2023 World Championships	1	Shahar Tibi	Sharon Kantor
3	Great Britain	2023 World Championships	3	Emma Wilson	Emma Wilson
4	Norway	2023 World Championships	4	Mina Mobekk	Mina Mobekk
5	China	2023 World Championships	8	Yan Zheng	Yan Zheng
6	Mexico	2023 World Championships	9	Mariana Aguilar	Mariana Aguilar
7	Italy	2023 World Championships	10	Marta Maggetti	Marta Maggetti
8	Netherlands	2023 World Championships	11	Sara Wennekes	Sara Wennekes
9	Spain	2023 World Championships	12	Pilar Lamadrid	Pilar Lamadrid
10	Croatia	2023 World Championships	14	Palma Čargo	Palma Čargo
11	Poland	2023 World Championships	19	Maja Dziarnowska	Maja Dziarnowska
12	New Zealand	2023 World Championships	22	Veerle ten Have	Veerle ten Have
13	Hong Kong	2022 Asian Games	2	Ma Kwan Ching	Ma Kwan Ching
14	United States	2023 Pan American Games (NAM)	2	Dominique Stater	Dominique Stater
15	Argentina	2023 Pan American Games (SAM)	4	Chiara Ferretti	Chiara Ferretti
—		2023 African Regatta			
—	Australia	2023 Sail Sydney (Oceania)	1	Samantha Costin	
16	Germany	2024 World Championships (Europe)	18	Theresa Steinlein	Theresa Steinlein
17	Czech Republic	2024 Last Chance Regatta	1	Kateřina Švíková	Kateřina Švíková
18	Sweden	2024 Last Chance Regatta	3	Johanna Hjertberg	Johanna Hjertberg
—	Individual Neutral Athletes	2024 Last Chance Regatta	4	Anastasiya Valkevich	
19	Turkey	2024 Last Chance Regatta	5	Merve Vatan	Merve Vatan
20	Slovenia	2024 Last Chance Regatta	6	Lina Eržen	Lina Eržen
21	Estonia	Emerging Nations Program	7	Ingrid Puusta	Ingrid Puusta
22	Austria	Developing Nations Program Reallocation	18	Lorena Abicht	Lorena Abicht
—	Switzerland	Developing Nations Program Reallocation	22	Elena Šandera	
23	Peru	Reallocation	8	María Belén Bazo	María Belén Bazo
24	Cyprus	Reallocation	10	Natasa Lappa	Natasa Lappa

=== Women's kite – Formula Kite ===
#	Nation	Event	Rank	Qualified sailor	Selected sailor
1	France	Host nation	—N/a		Lauriane Nolot
2	Great Britain	2023 World Championships	2	Eleanor Aldridge	Eleanor Aldridge
3	Netherlands	2023 World Championships	5	Annelous Lammerts	Annelous Lammerts
4	United States	2023 World Championships	7	Daniela Moroz	Daniela Moroz
5	China	2023 World Championships	5	Chen Jingyue	Chen Jingyue
6	Australia	2023 World Championships	11	Breiana Whitehead	Breiana Whitehead
7	Israel	2023 World Championships	12	Maya Ashkenazi	Gal Zukerman
8	Germany	2023 World Championships	14	Leonie Meyer	Leonie Meyer
9	Italy	2023 World Championships	15	Maggie Pescetto	Maggie Pescetto
10	Spain	2023 European Championships	6	Gisela Pulido	Gisela Pulido
11	Thailand	2022 Asian Games	2	Benyapa Jantawan	Benyapa Jantawan
12	Canada	2023 Pan American Games (NAM)	6	Emily Bugeja	Emily Bugeja
13	Argentina	2023 Pan American Games (SAM)	2	Catalina Turienzo	Catalina Turienzo
14	Mauritius	2023 African Regatta	1	Julie Paturau	Julie Paturau
15	New Zealand	2023 Sail Sydney (Oceania)	2	Lucy Bilger	Justina Kitchen
16	Switzerland	2024 Last Chance Regatta	1	Elena Lengwiler	Elena Lengwiler
17	Poland	2024 Last Chance Regatta	2	Julia Damasiewicz	Julia Damasiewicz
18	Turkey	2024 Last Chance Regatta	4	Derin Atakan	Derin Atakan
19	Austria	2024 Last Chance Regatta	5	Alina Kornelli	Alina Kornelli
20	Portugal	2024 Last Chance Regatta	7	Mafalda Pires de Lima	Mafalda Pires de Lima

=== Women's One-Person Dinghy – ILCA 6 ===
#	Nation	Event	Rank	Qualified sailor	Selected sailor
1	France	Host nation	—N/a		Louise Cervera
2	Hungary	2023 World Championships	1	Mária Érdi	Mária Érdi
3	Switzerland	2023 World Championships	2	Maud Jayet	Maud Jayet
4	Denmark	2023 World Championships	3	Anne-Marie Rindom	Anne-Marie Rindom
5	Netherlands	2023 World Championships	4	Marit Bouwmeester	Marit Bouwmeester
6	United States	2023 World Championships	5	Charlotte Rose	Erika Reineke
7	Belgium	2023 World Championships	6	Emma Plasschaert	Emma Plasschaert
8	Sweden	2023 World Championships	7	Josefin Olsson	Josefin Olsson
—	Portugal	2023 World Championships	8	Vasileia Karachaliou	
9	Italy	2023 World Championships	9	Carolina Albano	Chiara Benini Floriani
10	Australia	2023 World Championships	10	Mara Stransky	Zoe Thomson
11	Great Britain	2023 World Championships	11	Hannah Snellgrove	Hannah Snellgrove
12	Germany	2023 World Championships	13	Julia Büsselberg	Julia Büsselberg
13	Poland	2023 World Championships	18	Agata Barwińska	Agata Barwińska
14	Norway	2023 World Championships	19	Line Flem Høst	Line Flem Høst
15	Argentina	2023 World Championships	23	Lucía Falasca	Lucía Falasca
16	Canada	2023 World Championships	24	Sarah Douglas	Sarah Douglas
17	Malaysia	2022 Asian Games	1	Nur Shazrin Mohd Latif	Nur Shazrin Mohd Latif
18	Bermuda	2023 Pan American Games (NAM)	10	Adriana Penruddocke	Adriana Penruddocke
19	Cayman Islands	2023 Pan American Games (NAM)	12	Charlotte Webster	Charlotte Webster
20	Peru	2023 Pan American Games (SAM)	5	Florencia Chiarella	Florencia Chiarella
21	Chile	2023 Pan American Games (SAM)	8	Agustina von Appen	María José Poncell
22	Egypt	2023 African Regatta	1	Khouloud Mansy	Khouloud Mansy
23	Mozambique	2023 African Regatta	2	Deizy Nhaquile	Deizy Nhaquile
24	New Zealand	2023 Sail Sydney (Oceania)	4	Greta Pilkington	Greta Pilkington
25	Fiji	2023 Sail Sydney (Oceania)	8	Sophia Morgan	Sophia Morgan
26	China	2023 ASAF Championships (Asia)	1	Gu Min	Gu Min
27	Thailand	2023 ASAF Championships (Asia)	4	Sophia Montgomery	Sophia Montgomery
28	Finland	2024 ILCA World Championships	6	Monika Mikkola	Monika Mikkola
29	Ireland	2024 ILCA World Championships	20	Eve McMahon	Eve McMahon
30	Uruguay	2024 ILCA World Championships	29	Dolores Moreira	Dolores Moreira
31	Spain	2024 ILCA World Championships	34	Ana Moncada Sánchez	Ana Moncada Sánchez
32	Brazil	2024 ILCA World Championships	35	Gabriella Kidd	Gabriella Kidd
33	Turkey	2024 ILCA World Championships	36	Ecem Güzel	Ecem Güzel
34	Mexico	2024 ILCA World Championships	37	Elena Oetling	Elena Oetling
35	Israel	2024 ILCA World Championships	38	Shay Kakon	Shay Kakon
36	Lithuania	2024 ILCA European Championships	2	Viktorija Andrulytė	Viktorija Andrulytė
37	Croatia	2024 ILCA European Championships	4	Elena Vorobeva	Elena Vorobeva
38	Romania	2024 Last Chance Regatta	1	Ebru Bolat	Ebru Bolat
39	Cyprus	2024 Last Chance Regatta	2	Marilena Makri	Marilena Makri
40	Slovenia	2024 Last Chance Regatta	3	Lin Pletikos	Lin Pletikos
41	India	Emerging Nations Program	5	Nethra Kumanan	Nethra Kumanan
42	Kuwait	Universality places	—N/a		Ameena Shah
43	Samoa	Universality places	—N/a		Vaimooia Ripley

=== Women's skiff – 49erFX ===
#	Nation	Event	Rank	Qualified sailor	Selected sailor
1	France	Host nation	—N/a		Charline Picon; Sarah Steyaert
2	Sweden	2023 World Championships	1	Vilma Bobeck; Rebecca Netzler	Vilma Bobeck; Rebecca Netzler
3	Netherlands	2023 World Championships	2	Odile van Aanholt; Annette Duetz	Odile van Aanholt; Annette Duetz
4	Australia	2023 World Championships	3	Olivia Price; Evie Haseldine	Olivia Price; Evie Haseldine
5	Belgium	2023 World Championships	4	Isaura Maenhaut; Anouk Geurts	Isaura Maenhaut; Anouk Geurts
6	Great Britain	2023 World Championships	5	Freya Black; Saskia Tidey	Freya Black; Saskia Tidey
7	New Zealand	2023 World Championships	6	Jo Aleh; Molly Meech	Jo Aleh; Molly Meech
8	United States	2023 World Championships	7	Stephanie Roble; Maggie Shea	Stephanie Roble; Maggie Shea
9	Norway	2023 World Championships	8	Pia Dahl Andersen; Nora Edland	Helene Næss; Marie Rønningen
10	Spain	2023 World Championships	9	Támara Echegoyen; Paula Barceló	Támara Echegoyen; Paula Barceló
11	Denmark	2023 World Championships	10	Johanne Schmidt; Andrea Schmidt	Johanne Schmidt; Andrea Schmidt
12	Canada	2023 Pan American Games (NAM)	3	Alexandra Ten Hove; Mariah Millen	Antonia Lewin-LaFrance; Georgia Lewin-LaFrance
13	Brazil	2023 Pan American Games (SAM)	1	Martine Grael; Kahena Kunze	Martine Grael; Kahena Kunze
14	Italy	2023 European Championships	2	Jana Germani; Giorgia Bertuzzi	Jana Germani; Giorgia Bertuzzi
—		2023 African Regatta			
—		2023 Sail Sydney (Oceania)			
15	China	2023 ASAF Championships (Asia)	1	Hu Xiaoyu; Shan Mengyuan	Hu Xiaoyu; Shan Mengyuan
16	Poland	2024 Last Chance Regatta	1	Aleksandra Melzacka; Sandra Jankowiak	Aleksandra Melzacka; Sandra Jankowiak
17	Germany	2024 Last Chance Regatta	3	Marla Bergmann; Hanna Wille	Marla Bergmann; Hanna Wille
18	Finland	2024 Last Chance Regatta	4	Ronja Grönblom; Veera Hokka	Ronja Grönblom; Veera Hokka
19	Japan	Developing Nations Program Reallocation	6	Misaki Tanaka; Sera Nagamatsu	Misaki Tanaka; Sera Nagamatsu
20	Czech Republic	Developing Nations Program Reallocation	10	Zofia Burska; Sára Tkadlecová	Zofia Burska; Sára Tkadlecová

== Mixed events ==
=== Mixed two-person dinghy – 470 ===
#	Nation	Event	Rank	Qualified sailor	Selected sailor
1	France	Host nation	—N/a		Jérémie Mion; Camille Lecointre
2	Japan	2023 World Championships	1	Keiju Okada; Miho Yoshioka	Keiju Okada; Miho Yoshioka
3	Spain	2023 World Championships	2	Jordi Xammar; Nora Brugman	Jordi Xammar; Nora Brugman
4	Austria	2023 World Championships	4	Lara Vadlau; Lukas Mähr	Lara Vadlau; Lukas Mähr
5	Germany	2023 World Championships	5	Anastasiya Winkel; Malte Winkel	Anna Markfort; Simon Diesch
6	Sweden	2023 World Championships	6	Anton Dahlberg; Lovisa Karlsson	Anton Dahlberg; Lovisa Karlsson
7	Israel	2023 World Championships	7	Noa Lasri; Nitai Hasson	Noa Lasri; Nitai Hasson
8	Portugal	2023 World Championships	10	Pedro Costa; Carolina João	Pedro Costa; Carolina João
9	Switzerland	2023 World Championships	12	Yves Mermod; Maja Siegenthaler	Yves Mermod; Maja Siegenthaler
10	Australia	2023 Sail Sydney (Oceania)	2	Nia Jerwood; Conor Nicholas	Nia Jerwood; Conor Nicholas
11	China	2023 ASAF Championships (Asia)	1	Xu Ming; Tu Yahan	Xu Zangjun; Lü Yixiao
12	Angola	2024 World Championships (Africa)	59	Matias Montinho; Manuela Paulo	Matias Montinho; Manuela Paulo
13	Great Britain	2024 World Championships (Europe)	2	Vita Heathcote; Chris Grube	Vita Heathcote; Chris Grube
14	United States	2024 World Championships (NAM)	26	Stuart McNay; Lara Dallman-Weiss	Stuart McNay; Lara Dallman-Weiss
15	Brazil	2024 World Championships (SAM)	27	Henrique Haddad; Isabel Swan	Henrique Haddad; Isabel Swan
16	Italy	2024 Last Chance Regatta	1	Giacomo Ferrari; Alessandra Dubbini	Bruno Festo; Elena Berta
17	Slovenia	2024 Last Chance Regatta	3	Tina Mrak; Jakob Božič	Tina Mrak; Jakob Božič
18	Greece	2024 Last Chance Regatta	4	Ariadne-Paraskevi Spanaki; Odysseas-Emmanouil Spanakis	Ariadne-Paraskevi Spanaki; Odysseas-Emmanouil Spanakis
19	Turkey	2024 Last Chance Regatta	5	Lara Nalbantoğlu; Deniz Çınar	Lara Nalbantoğlu; Deniz Çınar

=== Mixed multihull – Nacra 17 ===
#	Nation	Event	Rank	Qualified sailor	Selected sailor
1	France	Host nation	—N/a		Tim Mourniac; Lou Berthomieu
2	Italy	2023 World Championships	1	Ruggero Tita; Caterina Banti	Ruggero Tita; Caterina Banti
3	Great Britain	2023 World Championships	2	John Gimson; Anna Burnet	John Gimson; Anna Burnet
4	Sweden	2023 World Championships	3	Emil Järudd; Hanna Jonsson	Emil Järudd; Hanna Jonsson
5	Netherlands	2023 World Championships	4	Laila van der Meer; Bjarne Bouwer	Laila van der Meer; Bjarne Bouwer
6	Germany	2023 World Championships	7	Paul Kohlhoff; Alica Stuhlemmer	Paul Kohlhoff; Alica Stuhlemmer
7	New Zealand	2023 World Championships	8	Micah Wilkinson; Erica Dawson	Micah Wilkinson; Erica Dawson
8	Argentina	2023 World Championships	9	Mateo Majdalani; Eugenia Bosco	Mateo Majdalani; Eugenia Bosco
9	Finland	2023 World Championships	10	Sinem Kurtbay; Akseli Keskinen	Sinem Kurtbay; Akseli Keskinen
10	Spain	2023 World Championships	11	Tara Pacheco; Andrés Barrio García	Tara Pacheco; Andrés Barrio García
11	United States	2023 Pan American Games (NAM)	2	Sarah Newberry-Moore; David Liebenberg	Sarah Newberry-Moore; David Liebenberg
12	Brazil	2023 Pan American Games (SAM)	3	Samuel Albrecht; Gabriela Nicolino	João Siemsen; Marina Arndt
13	Austria	2023 European Championships	4	Lukas Haberl; Tanja Frank	Lukas Haberl; Tanja Frank
—		2024 African Regatta			
14	Australia	2023 Sail Sydney (Oceania)	1	Brin Liddell; Rhiannon Brown	Brin Liddell; Rhiannon Brown
15	China	2023 ASAF Championships (Asia)	1	Mai Huicong; Chen Linlin	Mai Huicong; Chen Linlin
16	Denmark	2024 Last Chance Regatta	1	Natacha Saouma-Pedersen; Mathias Borreskov	Natacha Saouma-Pedersen; Mathias Borreskov
17	Turkey	2024 Last Chance Regatta	2	Alican Kaynar; Beste Kaynakçı	Alican Kaynar; Beste Kaynakçı
18	Belgium	2024 Last Chance Regatta	3	Lucas Claeyssens; Eline Verstraelen	Lucas Claeyssens; Eline Verstraelen
19	Japan	Developing Nations Program Reallocation	5	Shibuki Iitsuka; Oura Nishida Capiglia	Shibuki Iitsuka; Oura Nishida Capiglia
