= 2023 Sailing World Championships – Women's Formula Kite =

Women's Formula Kite at the 2023 Sailing World Championships
- Venue: The Hague, the Netherlands
- Dates: 14–20 August
- Competitors: 53 from 30 nations

Medalists
gold medal	Lauriane Nolot	France
silver medal	Ellie Aldridge	Great Britain
bronze medal	Lily Young	Great Britain

The women's Formula Kite competition at the 2023 Sailing World Championships was the women's kiteboarding event and was held in The Hague, the Netherlands, 14–20 August 2023. The entries were limited to 60 boards. The competitors participated in an opening series that was planned to 20 races, followed by a medal series. The medal series was planned for 19 August.

The competition served as a qualifying event for the 2024 Olympic sailing competition with 8 out of 20 national quota being distributed at the event.

== Summary ==
The entry list included US sailor, six-time World champion Daniela Moroz. This included the 2022 Formula Kite World Championships in Cagliari. The entry list also included Lauriane Nolot of France, who had won the Trofeo Princesa Sofía in Palma, the Semaine Olympique Française in Hyères and the Paris 2024 Test Event earlier in the year. Moreover, in the Sailing World Cup, Jessie Kampman of France (not present) had won the Allianz Regatta.

In difficult conditions, Moroz started by winning two races out of three on the first day, recording an eighth place in the third. No wind limited the possibility to sail on 18 August.

Nolot took ten race wins of 16 throughout the opening series, resulting in that she only needed one race win in the final. From the opening series results, Nolot and Aldrigde qualified directly to the final; Nolot carrying two wins forward and Aldridge carrying one. Nolot also won the championship title ahead of Brits Ellie Aldridge and Lily Young.

With the final results, national quotas were awarded Great Britain, the United States, the Netherlands, China, Australia, Israel, Germany and Italy.

== Results ==
=== Opening series ===
Results of individual races
Pos	Helmsman	Country	I	II	III	IV	V	VI	VII	VIII	IX	X	XI	XII	XIII	XIV	XV	XVI	Tot	Pts
1	Lauriane Nolot	France	7^{†}	1	1	2	DNC 28^{†}	1	1	1	2	1	1	1	4^{†}	4	1	1	57	18
2	Ellie Aldridge	Great Britain	13^{†}	DNF 28^{†}	2	2	2	1	2	1	1	2	1	3	2	2	3	7^{†}	72	24
3	Lily Young	Great Britain	DNF 28^{†}	2	2	1	2	DSQ 28^{†}	2	3	UFD 28^{†}	6	2	4	9	9	5	2	133	49
4	Katie Dabson	Great Britain	1	DNF 28^{†}	5	3	3	2	3	DSQ 28^{†}	7	5	5	5	13	20^{†}	6	3	137	61
5	Daniela Moroz	United States	STP 2	1	8	9	DNF 28^{†}	5	10^{†}	5	1	3	UFD 28^{†}	2	1	3	4	8	118	52
6	Annelous Lammerts	Netherlands	6	3	UFD 28^{†}	3	DNF 28^{†}	3	5	11^{†}	8	2	3	4	5	10	7	4	130	63
7	Chen Jingyue	China	16^{†}	12	15	5	1	5	12	2	2	1	DNF 28^{†}	1	12	1	10	17^{†}	140	79
8	Poema Newland	France	17	DNF 28^{†}	DNC 28^{†}	4	1	2	3	2	4	3	DNF 28^{†}	19	8	12	2	9	170	86
9	Madeleine Anderson	Great Britain	19^{†}	6	1	7	4	4	4	4	6	12^{†}	11	15^{†}	10	8	8	10	129	83
10	Liu Weidong	China	9	10	5	4	10	14^{†}	7	7	UFD 28^{†}	4	9	2	14^{†}	7	12	5	147	91
11	Breiana Whitehead	Australia	10	6	4	10	7	10	10	3	5	11^{†}	4	20^{†}	3	19^{†}	11	12	145	95
12	Maya Ashkenazi	Israel	5	5	9^{†}	5	3	8	7	8	5	5	12^{†}	5	21	6	23^{†}	15	142	98
13	Gal Zukerman	Israel	2	13^{†}	4	13	9	4	5	RDG 7.1	4	19^{†}	12	8	7	13	14	25^{†}	159.1	102.1
14	Leonie Meyer	Germany	2	5	3	1	4	11	1	4	3	14^{†}	6	12^{†}	DNF 26^{†}	DNC 26	18	22	158	106
15	Maggie Pescetto	Italy	3	7	7	9	5	7	11^{†}	11^{†}	6	6	8	3	DNF 26^{†}	16	19	19	163	115
16	Gisela Pulido	Spain	DNF 28^{†}	DCT 28^{†}	7	11	6	8	6	5	DSQ 28^{†}	4	2	DNF 28	19	5	9	6	200	116
17	Alina Kornelli	Austria	4	9	3	18^{†}	13	9	13	8	7	7	14^{†}	10	6	22^{†}	13	14	170	116
18	Alexia Fancelli	France	3	8	8	8	6	9	12^{†}	12^{†}	9	8	4	6	DNF 26^{†}	18	15	18	170	120
19	Sofia Tomasoni	Italy	6	4	DNF 28^{†}	6	DNF 28^{†}	6	9	12	RDG 11.6	9	7	13	18^{†}	11	16	11	195.6	121.6
20	Magdalena Woyciechowska	Poland	11^{†}	4	11^{†}	6	5	7	9	7	3	9	5	7	22	14	24^{†}	24	168	122
21	Julia Damasiewicz	Poland	8	10	10	DNF 28^{†}	DNF 28^{†}	6	6	6	11	10	15	7	11	17	21^{†}	13	207	130
22	Lysa Caval	France	8	8	6	8	12	13^{†}	4	DNF 28^{†}	8	10	6	8	15	24^{†}	17	20	195	130
23	Elena Lengwiler	Switzerland	18	3	19^{†}	12	8	3	8	6	9	16	DNF 28^{†}	6	17	23	25^{†}	16	217	145
24	Justina Kitchen	New Zealand	4	11	RET 28^{†}	10	8	14	8	9	17^{†}	7	9	11	20	21^{†}	20	21	218	152
25	Héloïse Pégourié	France	5	2	6	7	11	12	14	9	UFD 28^{†}	UFD 28^{†}	10	DNC 28^{†}	16	15	22	23	236	152
26	Wang Si	China	12	12	9	13	7	10	15	16^{†}	DNC 28^{†}	UFD 28^{†}	3	9	10	1	1	1	175	103
27	Izabela Satrjan	Poland	7	DNF 28^{†}	13	14^{†}	12	11	17^{†}	13	12	12	10	10	4	3	2	2	170	111
28	Chloé Revil	France	DNF 28^{†}	DNF 28^{†}	12	15^{†}	9	12	11	10	10	13	13	11	2	2	6	3	185	114
29	Nina Arcisz	Poland	12	14^{†}	10	12	11	13	14^{†}	14^{†}	10	8	11	9	7	4	5	7	161	119
30	Derin Atakan	Turkey	20	7	UFD 28^{†}	11	10	15	16	15	UFD 28^{†}	UFD 28^{†}	8	12	1	8	4	6	217	133
31	Noora Ruskola	Finland	15	11	14	19^{†}	17^{†}	15	16^{†}	10	13	13	13	14	3	5	9	4	191	139
32	Catalina Turienzo	Argentina	9	9	13	16	DNF 28^{†}	17	13	17	11	11	19^{†}	DNC 28^{†}	9	6	3	5	214	139
33	Mafalda Pires de Lima	Portugal	16^{†}	DNF 28^{†}	12	14	15	17^{†}	15	13	14	15	14	15	5	11	7	8	219	158
34	Maria do Socorro Reis	Brazil	19	DNF 28^{†}	14	15	14	16	17	14	UFD 28^{†}	UFD 28^{†}	7	13	15	7	8	11	254	170
35	Anaïs Mai Desjardins	France	13	16	11	17	15	19^{†}	18	20^{†}	UFD 28^{†}	14	15	14	6	10	11	12	239	172
36	Derin Deniz Sorguç	Turkey	11	15	DNF 28^{†}	16	DNF 28^{†}	18^{†}	18	16	15	17	16	16	8	9	10	9	250	176
37	Mariska Wildenberg	Netherlands	14	DNF 28^{†}	16	DNF 28^{†}	14	18	19	19	15	DNF 28^{†}	16	17	12	12	12	10	278	194
38	Benyapa Jantawan	Thailand	STP 15	DNC 28^{†}	16	17	18	19^{†}	20^{†}	15	13	16	17	16	18	14	13	13	268	201
39	Zoé Boutang	France	10	DNF 28^{†}	17	21^{†}	13	16	20^{†}	18	18	20	19	18	11	13	15	14	271	202
40	Dominika Braunová	Czech Republic	21^{†}	17	18	20^{†}	16	21^{†}	19	17	12	15	18	18	17	15	14	15	273	211
41	Karolina Larsson	Sweden	15	15	17	25^{†}	20	22^{†}	22	20	16	UFD 28^{†}	20	21	13	17	18	16	305	230
42	Lizeth Loaiza	Colombia	DNF 28^{†}	14	15	18	16	20	21^{†}	21	16	18	17	17	DNC 29^{†}	20	17	21	308	230
43	Lee Young-eun	South Korea	18	13	18	22^{†}	19	20	21^{†}	18	19	21^{†}	18	19	19	19	16	19	299	235
44	Julie Paturau	Mauritius	DNF 28^{†}	DNF 28^{†}	DNC 28^{†}	20	19	21	22	22	14	18	22	20	14	16	20	17	329	245
45	Marie-Eve Mayrand	Canada	20	DNF 28^{†}	DNC 28^{†}	21	21	25^{†}	24	19	17	17	21	22	16	18	19	18	334	253
46	Emily Bugeja	Canada	17	DNF 28^{†}	19	19	18	22	24	24	21	DNF 28^{†}	DNC 28^{†}	23	21	21	22	20	355	271
47	Marija Dolenc	Croatia	21	DNF 28^{†}	21	22	17	23	23	23	20	DNF 28^{†}	DNC 28^{†}	21	20	22	21	22	360	276
48	Monika Žižlavská	Czech Republic	DNF 28^{†}	DNF 28^{†}	DNF 28	23	22	23	25	21	DNF 28	22	20	22	23	DNF 29^{†}	24	23	389	304
49	Aija Ambrasa	Latvia	DNF 28^{†}	DNF 28^{†}	DNF 28^{†}	24	23	24	23	22	DNF 28	DNF 28	22	24	22	23	23	24	394	310
50	Nataliya Leshko	Canada	DNF 28^{†}	DNC 28^{†}	20	23	DNF 28	DNF 28	DNF 28	25	18	19	23	DNF 28	DNF 29^{†}	DNF 29	DNF 29	DNF 29	412	327
51	Saki Kajiwara	Japan	DNF 28^{†}	DNF 28^{†}	DNF 28	DNF 28	24	DNF 28	DNF 28	DNF 28	DNF 28	DNF 28	DNF 28	UFD 28	DNF 29^{†}	24	DNF 29	DNF 29	443	358
52	Maria Ashida	Mexico	DNF 28^{†}	DNF 28^{†}	DNC 28	DNF 28	DNF 28	DNC 28	DNF 28	DNC 28	DNF 28	DNF 28	21	UFD 28	DNC 29^{†}	DNF 29	DNF 29	DNF 29	445	360
53	Mareike Weber	Germany	DNF 28^{†}	DNF 28^{†}	DNC 28	DNF 28	DNF 28	DNC 28	DNF 28	DNC 28	DNF 28	DNF 28	DNC 28	DNC 28	DNC 29^{†}	DNF 29	DNC 29	DNC 29	452	367

Scoring system: low-point system; Source:
Legend: DCT – Disqualified after causing a tangle in an incident; DNC – Did not come to the starting area; DNF – Did not finish; DSQ – Disqualified; RDG – Redress given; RET – Retired; STP – Standard penalty imposed; UFD – "U" flag disqualification; † – Discarded race not counted in the overall result;

=== Medal series ===
==== Semi-final A ====
Results of individual races
Pos	Crew	Country	CF	I
1	Lily Young	Great Britain	WW	W
2	Annelous Lammerts	Netherlands	W	3
3	Chen Jingyue	China		2
4	Liu Weidong	China		4

Scoring system: most wins; Source:
Legend: – Advance to final;

==== Semi-final B ====
Results of individual races
Pos	Crew	Country	CF	I	II	III	IV
1	Katie Dabson	Great Britain	W	2	4	W	W
2	Poema Newland	France		STP W	W	UFD 5	2
3	Daniela Moroz	United States	WW	3	2	2	RET 5
4	Madeleine Anderson	Great Britain		4	3	UFD 5	3

Scoring system: most wins; Source:
Legend: – Advance to final; RET – Retired; STP – Standard penalty imposed; UFD – "U" flag disqualification;

==== Final ====
Results of individual races
Pos	Crew	Country	CF	I
Gold medal	Lauriane Nolot	France	WW	W
Silver medal	Ellie Aldridge	Great Britain	W	2
Bronze medal	Lily Young	Great Britain		3
4	Katie Dabson	Great Britain		4

Scoring system: most wins; Source:
