= Sailing at the 2024 Summer Olympics – Women's Formula Kite =

Women's Formula Kite at the Games of the XXXIII Olympiad
- Venues: Marseille Marina
- Dates: 4–8 August 2024
- Competitors: 20 from 20 nations

Medalists
1st place, gold medalist(s)		Ellie Aldridge	Great Britain
2nd place, silver medalist(s)		Lauriane Nolot	France
3rd place, bronze medalist(s)		Annelous Lammerts	Netherlands

The Women's Formula Kite was a sailing event part of the Sailing at the 2024 Summer Olympics program in Marseille and took place between 4–8 August 2024. It was the first appearance of women's kiteboarding in the Olympic games. 20 sailors representing 20 countries entered in to the event.

The event began with up to 16 preliminary races in the opening series across four days. The top 10 competitors move on to the medal series. The top two competitors from the opening series advance directly to the final, while positions 3–10 move in to the semi-final.

The eight competitors in the semi-finals were split into two groups of equal strength with a goal of reaching three race victories. The top sailors in each split started the semi-finals with two race victories credited, while the second-ranked sailors started with one race victory. The winner of each semi-final moved on to the final. In the final, the goal was also to reach three race victories. The highest ranked sailor from the opening series starts the final with two race victories, while the second-ranked sailor starts with one race victory.

== Schedule ==
Sun 4 Aug	Mon 5 Aug	Tue 6 Aug	Wed 7 Aug	Thu 8 Aug
Race 1 Race 2 Race 3 Race 4	Race 5	Race 6	Cancelled	Semi-finals; Final

== Preliminary races ==
=== Results ===
Official results (after 6 races). Races 7 to 16 were cancelled due to inadequate wind speeds.

Results of individual races
Pos	Helmsman	Country	I	II	III	IV	V	VI	VII	VIII	IX	X	XI	XII	XIII	XIV	XV	XVI	Tot	Pts
1	Lauriane Nolot	France	2	1	12^{†}	2	6	1	-	-	-	-	-	-	-	-	-	-	24	12
2	Eleanor Aldridge	Great Britain	1	2	2	3	4	21^{†} DNS	-	-	-	-	-	-	-	-	-	-	33	12
3	Daniela Moroz	United States	7^{†}	3	4	1	2	7	-	-	-	-	-	-	-	-	-	-	24	17
4	Annelous Lammerts	Netherlands	14^{†}	4	5	5	7	2	-	-	-	-	-	-	-	-	-	-	37	23
5	Leonie Meyer	Germany	4	7	8^{†}	4	3	6	-	-	-	-	-	-	-	-	-	-	32	24
6	Elena Lengwiler	Switzerland	3	6	1	15.5; RDG	1	21^{†} DNS	-	-	-	-	-	-	-	-	-	-	47.5	26.5
7	Breiana Whitehead	Australia	12^{†}	5	7	6	9	8	-	-	-	-	-	-	-	-	-	-	47	35
8	Maggie Pescetto	Italy	5	21^{†} DSQ	3	10	14	4	-	-	-	-	-	-	-	-	-	-	57	36
9	Julia Damasiewicz	Poland	6	8	11	7	11	21^{†} DNS	-	-	-	-	-	-	-	-	-	-	64	43
10	Gal Zukerman	Israel	10	9	10	11^{†}	5	11	-	-	-	-	-	-	-	-	-	-	56	45
11	Alina Kornelli	Austria	16^{†}	12	13	9	8	5	-	-	-	-	-	-	-	-	-	-	63	47
12	Gisela Pulido	Spain	11	11	6	12^{†}	10	10	-	-	-	-	-	-	-	-	-	-	60	48
13	Catalina Turienzo	Argentina	13	13	19^{†}	14	13	3	-	-	-	-	-	-	-	-	-	-	75	56
14	Mafalda Pires de Lima	Portugal	8	15^{†}	14	13	15	9	-	-	-	-	-	-	-	-	-	-	74	59
15	Jingyue Chen	China	20	14	9	8	16	21^{†} DNS	-	-	-	-	-	-	-	-	-	-	88	67
16	Derin Atakan	Turkey	15	16	15	15	12	21^{†} DNS	-	-	-	-	-	-	-	-	-	-	94	73
17	Justina Kitchen	New Zealand	9	10	21^{†} DNF	16	18	21; DNS	-	-	-	-	-	-	-	-	-	-	95	74
18	Emily Bugeja	Canada	19^{†}	19	18	17	17	12	-	-	-	-	-	-	-	-	-	-	102	83
19	Benyapa Jantawan	Thailand	17	18	16	18	21^{†} DNC	21; DNS	-	-	-	-	-	-	-	-	-	-	111	90
20	Julie Paturau	Mauritius	18	17	17	21^{†} RET	21; DNC	21; DNS	-	-	-	-	-	-	-	-	-	-	115	94

Scoring system: low-point system;
Legend: – Qualified for medal race(s); BFD – Black flag disqualification; DNC – Did not come to the starting area; DNF – Did not finish; DNS – Did not start; DPI – Discretionary penalty imposed; DSQ – Disqualified; OCS – On the course side of the starting line; RDG – Redress given; RET – Retired; UFD – "U" flag disqualification; † – Discarded race not counted in the overall result;

== Medal series ==
Medal series official results:

=== Semi-finals ===
==== Semi-final A ====
Rank	Helmsman	Nation	Earned Wins	Race 1	Race 2	Race 3	Race 4	Race 5	Race 6	Total wins	Notes
1	Daniela Moroz	United States	2	1	—					3	Advanced to Finals
2	Elena Lengwiler	Switzerland	1	2 SCP	—					1	
3	Gal Zukerman	Israel	0	3	—					0	
4	Breiana Whitehead	Australia	0	4 SCP	—					0	

- SCP = Scoring Penalty

==== Semi-final B ====
Rank	Helmsman	Nation	Earned Wins	Race 1	Race 2	Race 3	Race 4	Race 5	Race 6	Total wins	Notes
1	Annelous Lammerts	Netherlands	2	1	—					3	Advanced to Finals
2	Leonie Meyer	Germany	1	2	—					1	
3	Julia Damasiewicz	Poland	0	3	—					0	
4	Maggie Pescetto	Italy	0	4	—					0	

=== Finals ===
Rank	Helmsman	Nation	Earned Wins	Race 1	Race 2	Race 3	Race 4	Race 5	Race 6	Total wins
1st place, gold medalist(s)	Eleanor Aldridge	Great Britain	1	1	1	—				3
2nd place, silver medalist(s)	Lauriane Nolot	France	2	2	3	—				2
3rd place, bronze medalist(s)	Annelous Lammerts	Netherlands	0	4	2	—				0
4	Daniela Moroz	United States	0	3	4 SCP	—				0

- SCP = Scoring Penalty
