= Sailing at the 2024 Summer Olympics – 470 =

470 at the Games of the XXXIII Olympiad
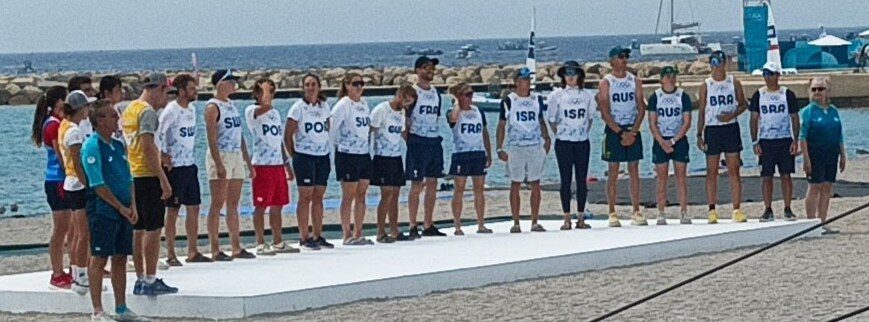
- The 470 dinghy teams
- Venues: Marseille, France
- Dates: 2–7 August 2024
- Competitors: 38 from 19 nations

Medalists
1st place, gold medalist(s)		Lara Vadlau; Lukas Mähr	Austria
2nd place, silver medalist(s)		Keiju Okada; Miho Yoshioka	Japan
3rd place, bronze medalist(s)		Anton Dahlberg; Lovisa Karlsson	Sweden

The Mixed 470 was a sailing event part of the Sailing at the 2024 Summer Olympics program in Marseille and took place between 2–7 August 2024. The event was the first for the Mixed 470 class for double-handed dinghies in the Olympics, replacing the separate men's and women's classes that had previously existed. All crews for the Mixed event must contain one male and one female sailor. A total of 19 crews representing 19 nations entered in to the event scheduled for 10 preliminary races and one medal race.

== Schedule ==
Fri 2 Aug	Sat 3 Aug	Sun 4 Aug	Mon 5 Aug	Tue 6 Aug	Wed 7 Aug	Thu 8 Aug
Race 1 Race 2	Race 3 Race 4	Race 5 Race 6	~~Race 7~~; ~~Race 8~~; Postponed	Race 7 Race 8	~~Medal race~~ Postponed	Medal race

== Results ==
Official results

Results of individual races
Pos	Helmsman	Country	I	II	III	IV	V	VI	VII	VIII	MR	Tot	Pts
1st place, gold medalist(s)	Lara Vadlau; Lukas Mähr	Austria	20^{†} BFD	5	3	1	7	1	5	2	14	58	38
2nd place, silver medalist(s)	Keiju Okada; Miho Yoshioka	Japan	1	2	2	6	14^{†}	12	9	3	6	55	41
3rd place, bronze medalist(s)	Anton Dahlberg; Lovisa Karlsson	Sweden	7	14^{†}	1	2	1	13	11	4	8	61	47
4	Jordi Xammar; Nora Brugman	Spain	5	6^{†}	5	3	6	3	3	6	18	55	49
5	Diogo Costa; Carolina João	Portugal	20^{†} BFD	3	16	14	2	4	2	8	4	73	53
6	Camille Lecointre; Jérémie Mion	France	11	10	13^{†}	4	5	5	6	13	2	69	56
7	Nitai Hasson; Noa Lasry	Israel	10	7	18^{†}	9	8	2	7	14	10	85	67
8	Yves Mermod; Maja Siegenthaler	Switzerland	20^{†} BFD	1	14	16	4	7	1	9	16	88	68
9	Nia Jerwood; Conor Nicholas	Australia	6	20^{†} UFD	7	7	3	16	8	15	12	94	74
10	Henrique Haddad; Isabel Swan	Brazil	12	12	10	12	9	8	13^{†}	1	20	97	84
11	Vita Heathcote; Chris Grube	Great Britain	2	16	8	5	12	20^{†} UFD	15	7	-	85	65
12	Ariadne Spanaki; Odysseas Spanakis	Greece	13	11	6	17^{†}	13	11; DPI	4	10	-	85	68
13	Stu McNay; Lara Dallman-Weiss	United States	9	17	4	13	11	6	18^{†}	12	-	90	72
14	Simon Diesch; Anna Markfort	Germany	8	4	9	10	16	9	19	20^{†} RET	-	95	75
15	Elena Berta; Bruno Festo	Italy	3	13	12	15	10	20^{†} DNF	12	11	-	96	76
16	Deniz Çınar; Lara Nalbantoğlu	Turkey	14	9	15	8	18^{†}	11	14	5	-	94	76
17	Xu Zangjun; Lü Yixiao	China	4	15	11	11	15	14	16^{†}	16	-	102	86
18	Tina Mrak; Jakob Božič	Slovenia	15	8	17	18^{†}	17	15	10	17	-	117	99
19	Matias Montinho; Manuela Paulo	Angola	16	18	20^{†} DNS	20; DNC	19	18; DPI	17	18	-	146	126

Scoring system: low-point system;
Legend: – Qualified for medal race(s); BFD – Black flag disqualification; DNC – Did not come to the starting area; DNF – Did not finish; DNS – Did not start; DPI – Discretionary penalty imposed; OCS – On the course side of the starting line; RDG – Redress given; RET – Retired; UFD – "U" flag disqualification; † – Discarded race not counted in the overall result;
