= 2021 Youth Sailing World Championships – Girl's Formula Kite =

Girl's Formula Kite at the 2021 Youth Sailing World Championships
- Venue: Al-Mussanah, Oman
- Dates: 11–18 December
- Competitors: 10 from 10 nations

Medalists
gold medal	Gal Zukerman	Israel
silver medal	Julia Damasiewicz	Poland
bronze medal	Héloïse Pégourié	France

The girl's Formula Kite competition at the 2021 Youth Sailing World Championships took place between December 11 and 18 2021. 10 sailors from 10 nations were due to compete. Israeli Gal Zukerman won the event.

== Results ==
Rank	Helm	Country	R1	R2	R3	R4	R5	R6	R7	R8	R9	R10	R11	R12	R13	R14	R15	R16	R17	R18	Total	Nett
1	Gal Zukerman	Israel	(1.0)	(1.0)	(1.0)	1.0	1.0	1.0	1.0	1.0	1.0	1.0	1.0	1.0	1.0	1.0	1.0	1.0	1.0	1.0	18.0	15.0
2	Julia Damasiewicz	Poland	2.0	2.0	2.0	2.0	(11.0 RET)	(11.0 RET)	2.0	2.0	2.0	2.0	2.0	2.0	(3.0)	2.0	2.0	2.0	2.0	2.0	55.0	30.0
3	Héloïse Pégourié	France	(4.0)	3.0	3.0	3.0	2.0	2.0	3.0	3.0	(4.0)	3.0	(4.0)	3.0	2.0	3.0	3.0	4.0	3.0	3.0	55.0	43.0
4	Derin Atakan	Turkey	3.0	4.0	4.0	4.0	3.0	4.0	4.0	(5.0)	3.0	4.0	(6.0)	(6.0)	4.0	5.0	4.0	3.0	4.0	4.0	74.0	57.0
5	Irene Tari	Italy	(5.0)	(6.0)	5.0	5.0	4.0	3.0	5.0	(6.0)	5.0	5.0	3.0	4.0	5.0	4.0	5.0	5.0	5.0	5.0	85.0	68.0
6	Ella Geiger	United Kingdom	(7.0)	5.0	6.0	6.0	(11.0 DNF)	5.0	6.0	4.0	6.0	(11.0 DNF)	5.0	5.0	6.0	6.0	6.0	6.0	6.0	6.0	113.0	84.0
7	Marie Prevot	Colombia	(11.0 DNF)	(11.0 DNF)	(11.0 DNF)	11.0 DNF	5.0	11.0 DNF	11.0 DNS	11.0 DNF	7.0	11.0 DNF	11.0 DNF	7.0	11.0 DNS	8.0	7.0	8.0 SP1	7.0	7.0	166.0	133.0
8	Maria Catalina Turienzo	Argentina	6.0	7.0	7.0	7.0	(11.0 RET)	(11.0 DNF)	(11.0 DNS)	11.0 DNS	11.0 DNF	11.0 DNF	11.0 DNS	11.0 DNF	7.0	7.0	11.0 DNS	11.0 DNS	8.0	8.0	167.0	134.0
9	Marija Dolenc	Croatia	(11.0 DNF)	(11.0 DNF)	(11.0 DNF)	11.0 DNF	11.0 DNF	11.0 DNF	11.0 DNS	11.0 DNS	11.0 DNS	11.0 DNS	11.0 DNS	11.0 DNS	11.0 DNS	11.0 DNS	11.0 DNS	11.0 DNF	11.0 DNS	11.0 DNF	198.0	165.0
9	Caroline Locke	United States	(11.0 DNF)	(11.0 DNF)	(11.0 DNF)	11.0 DNF	11.0 DNF	11.0 DNF	11.0 DNS	11.0 DNS	11.0 DNS	11.0 DNF	11.0 DNS	11.0 DNS	11.0 DNS	11.0 DNS	11.0 DNF	11.0 DNF	11.0 DNS	11.0 DNF	198.0	165.0
