= Atakan =

Atakan or Atakhan a Turkish given name and surname, from ata "ancestor" and kan "blood".

== Given name ==
- Atakan Alaftargil (born 1976), Turkish alpine skier
- Atakan Yüksel (born 1985), Turkish wrestler
- Atakan Cangöz (born 1992, Turkish football midfielder (Serik Belediyespor)
- Atakan Karazor (born 1996), German football midfielder (VfB Stuttgart)
- Atakan Çankaya (born 1998), Turkish football midfielder (Ankaragücü)
- Atakan Akkaynak (born 1999), German football midfielder (Çaykur Rizespor)
- Atakan Üner (born 1999), Turkish football winger (Ümraniyespor)
- Atakan Gündüz (born 2001), Turkish football defender (Trabzonspor)

== Surname ==
- Derin Atakan (born 2006), Turkish female kitesurfer
- Nancy Atakan (born 1946), American artist who has lived in Turkey since 1969
- Ruzen Atakan (born 1966), Turkish Cypriot painter
