= Nalbantoğlu =

Nalbantoğlu is a Turkish surname. Notable people with the surname include:

- Lara Nalbantoğlu (born 2001), Turkish female sport sailor
- Muslu Nalbantoğlu (born 1983), Dutch footballer of Turkish descent
