= Diogo Costa (sailor) =

Portuguese sailor

Personal information
- Full name: Diogo Eurico Vaz de Bacelar da Fonseca e Costa
- Nationality: Portugal
- Born: 23 August 1997 (age 29) Porto, Portugal
- Height: 1.74 m (5 ft 9 in)
- Parents: Fernando Luís Lopes da Fonseca e Costa (father); Maria Cecília de Sousa Carneiro Vaz de Bacelar (mother)

Sport
- Sport: Sailing

Diogo Eurico Vaz de Bacelar da Fonseca e Costa (born 23 August 1997) is a Portuguese sailor. He competed in the 2020 Summer Olympics.

Costa placed second in the 2021 470 World Championships with Pedro Costa, qualifying the pair for the 2020 Olympics. He and Carolina João won a place to compete in the 2024 Olympics as did the ILCA 7 sailor Eduardo Marques and the kitefoiler Mafalda Pires de Lima.
