= Puerto Rico at the 2024 Summer Olympics =

- IOC code: PUR
- NOC: Puerto Rico Olympic Committee
- Website: copur.pr (in Spanish)

in Paris, France 26 July 2024 – 11 August 2024
- Competitors: 51 (27 men and 24 women) in 13 sports
- Flag bearers (opening): Sebastian Rivera & Jasmine Camacho-Quinn
- Flag bearer (closing): Luis Castro Rivera
- Medals Ranked 80th: Gold 0 Silver 0 Bronze 2 Total 2

Summer Olympics appearances (overview)
- 1948; 1952; 1956; 1960; 1964; 1968; 1972; 1976; 1980; 1984; 1988; 1992; 1996; 2000; 2004; 2008; 2012; 2016; 2020; 2024

Puerto Rico competed at the 2024 Summer Olympics in Paris from 26 July to 11 August 2024. It was the territory's twentieth consecutive appearance at the Summer Olympics. It was also the fourth consecutive games in which Puerto Rico earned at least one medal, it being the first time this happened in Puerto Rico's Olympic Games history.

Puerto Rico concluded the Olympics with two bronze medals, both won by flag bearers Jasmine Camacho-Quinn and Sebastian Rivera. Jasmine was edged out in a close race in a split-second finish in the Women's 100 metres hurdles, ultimately finishing 3rd. Meanwhile, Sebastian won bronze in the Men's freestyle 65 kg alongside fellow bronze medalist Islam Dudaev of Albania despite losing out to gold medalist Kotaro Kiyooka of Japan, first beating Maxim Saculțan of Moldova, and then Tömör-Ochiryn Tulga of Mongolia after a successful challenge by a single point.

== Medalists ==
The following Puerto Rican competitors won medals at the games. In the by discipline sections below, medalists' names are bolded.

Medal	Name	Sport	Event	Date
Bronze	Jasmine Camacho-Quinn	Athletics	Women's 100 m hurdles	August 10
Bronze	Sebastian Rivera	Wrestling	Men's freestyle 65 kg	August 11

Medals by sport
**Sport**	1st place, gold medalist(s)	2nd place, silver medalist(s)	3rd place, bronze medalist(s)	**Total**
Athletics	0	0	1	**1**
Wrestling	0	0	1	**1**
Total	0	0	2	2

Medals by gender
Gender	1st place, gold medalist(s)	2nd place, silver medalist(s)	3rd place, bronze medalist(s)	Total
Female	0	0	1	**1**
Male	0	0	1	**1**
Mixed	0	0	0	**0**
Total	0	0	2	2

Medals by date
**Date**	1st place, gold medalist(s)	2nd place, silver medalist(s)	3rd place, bronze medalist(s)	**Total**
10 August	0	0	1	**1**
11 August	0	0	1	**1**
Total	0	0	2	2

== Competitors ==
The following is the list of number of competitors in the Games.

Sport	Men	Women	Total
Archery	0	1	1
Athletics	3	5	8
Basketball	12	12	24
Boxing	1	1	2
Diving	0	1	1
Golf	1	0	1
Judo	1	1	2
Sailing	1	0	1
Shooting	0	1	1
Skateboarding	1	0	1
Swimming	1	1	2
Table tennis	2	1	3
Wrestling	4	0	4
Total	27	24	51

== Archery ==
One Puerto Rican archer qualified for the 2024 Summer Olympics women's individual recurve competitions by virtue of her result at the 2024 Pan American Continental Qualification Tournament in Medellín, Colombia.

Athlete	Event	Ranking round		Round of 64	Round of 32	Round of 16	Quarterfinals	Semifinals	Final / BM	
Athlete	Event	Score	Seed	Opposition Score	Opposition Score	Opposition Score	Opposition Score	Opposition Score	Opposition Score	Rank
Alondra Rivera	Women's individual	547	64	Lim S-h (KOR); **L** 0–6	Did not advance					

== Athletics ==
Puerto Rican track and field athletes achieved the entry standards for Paris 2024, either by passing the direct qualifying mark (or time for track and road races) or by world ranking, in the following events (a maximum of 3 athletes each):

Key

- Note–Ranks given for track events are within the athlete's heat only
- **Q** = Qualified for the next round
- **q** = Qualified for the next round as a fastest loser or, in field events, by position without achieving the qualifying target
- **NR** = National record
- **SB** = Seasonal best
- **PB** = Personal best
- N/A = Round not applicable for the event
- Bye = Athlete not required to compete in round

Track & road events

Athlete	Event	Heat		Repechage		Semifinal		Final	
Athlete	Event	Result	Rank	Result	Rank	Result	Rank	Result	Rank
Gladymar Torres	Women's 100 m	11.12 **NR**	5 **q**	—N/a		11.33	6	Did not advance	
Gabby Scott	Women's 400 m	50.74 **NR**	4 **R**	50.52 **NR**	1 **Q**	51.22	7	Did not advance	
**Jasmine Camacho-Quinn**	Women's 100 m hurdles	12.42	1 **Q**	Bye		12.35 **SB**	1 **Q**	12.36	3rd place, bronze medalist(s)
Grace Claxton	Women's 400 m hurdles	56.29	6	55.94	4	Did not advance			
Rachelle de Orbeta	Women's 20 km walk	—N/a						1:33:33	29

Field events

Athlete	Event	Qualification		Final	
Athlete	Event	Result	Rank	Result	Rank
Luis Castro	Men's high jump	2.20	15	Did not advance	
Jerome Vega	Men's hammer throw	71.61	26	Did not advance	

Combined events – Men's decathlon

Athlete	Event	100 m	LJ	SP	HJ	400 m	110H	DT	PV	JT	1500 m	Final	Rank
Ayden Owens-Delerme	Result	10.35 s	7.66 m **SB**	15.17 m	2.02 m **SB**	46.17 s	14.09 s	43.36 m	4.80 m	51.17 m	4:40.39 s **SB**	8437	9
Ayden Owens-Delerme	Points	1011	975	800	822	1000	963	733	849	606	678	8437	9

== Basketball ==
=== 5×5 basketball ===
Summary

Team	Event	Group stage				Quarterfinal	Semifinal	Final / BM	
Team	Event	Opposition Score	Opposition Score	Opposition Score	Rank	Opposition Score	Opposition Score	Opposition Score	Rank
Puerto Rico men's	Men's tournament	South Sudan; **L** 79–90	Serbia; **L** 66–107	United States; **L** 83–104	4	Did not advance			
Puerto Rico women's	Women's tournament	Serbia; **L** 55–58	Spain; **L** 62–63	China; **L** 58–80	4	Did not advance			

==== Men's tournament ====
The Puerto Rico men's national basketball team qualified for the Olympics by winning the 2024 Olympic Qualifying Tournament in San Juan, Puerto Rico, two decades after their last appearance in the 2004 Summer Olympics.

Team roster The roster was announced on 7 July 2024.

Puerto Rico men's national basketball team roster
Players
Coaches

Pos.	No.	Name	Age – Date of birth	Height	Club	Ctr.
SF	0	Isaiah Pineiro	29 – 2 February 1995	2.01 m (6 ft 7 in)	Palencia	(Spain)
F/C	1	George Conditt IV	23 – 22 August 2000	2.12 m (6 ft 11 in)	Gran Canaria	(Spain)
PG	3	Jordan Howard	28 – 6 January 1996	1.80 m (5 ft 11 in)	Obradoiro	(Spain)
SG	9	Davon Reed	29 – 11 June 1995	1.96 m (6 ft 5 in)	Memphis Hustle	(United States)
PG	10	Jose Alvarado	26 – 12 April 1998	1.83 m (6 ft 0 in)	New Orleans Pelicans	(United States)
G	11	Stevie Thompson	27 – 23 March 1997	1.94 m (6 ft 4 in)	Vaqueros de Bayamón	(Puerto Rico)
SF	12	Aleem Ford	26 – 22 December 1997	2.03 m (6 ft 8 in)	Leones de Ponce	(Puerto Rico)
G	24	Gian Clavell	30 – 26 November 1993	1.93 m (6 ft 4 in)	Granada	(Spain)
F/C	28	Ismael Romero	33 – 23 June 1991	2.03 m (6 ft 8 in)	Mets de Guaynabo	(Puerto Rico)
PF	32	Christopher Ortiz (C)	31 – 2 April 1993	2.02 m (6 ft 8 in)	Osos de Manatí	(Puerto Rico)
F/C	41	Arnaldo Toro	26 – 28 October 1997	2.02 m (6 ft 8 in)	VEF Rīga	(Latvia)
PG	51	Tremont Waters	26 – 10 January 1998	1.80 m (5 ft 11 in)	Gigantes de Carolina	(Puerto Rico)

Head coach

- (Puerto Rico) Nelson Colón

Assistant coach(es)

- (Puerto Rico) Rafael Cruz
- (Spain) David García

Legend

- **(C)** Team captain
- **Club** – describes last
  club before the tournament
- **Age** – describes age
  on 5 July 2024

Group play

Pos	Team	Pld	W	L	PF	PA	PD	Pts	Qualification
1	United States	3	3	0	317	253	+64	**6**	Quarterfinals
2	Serbia	3	2	1	287	261	+26	**5**	Quarterfinals
3	South Sudan	3	1	2	261	278	−17	**4**	
**4**	Puerto Rico	**3**	**0**	**3**	**228**	**301**	**−73**	**3**	

Source: FIBA
Rules for classification: 1) classification points; 2) head-to-head results; 3) head-to-head game points difference; 4) head-to-head number of game points scored.

28 July 2024
11:00

Boxscore

**South Sudan**	**90**–79	Puerto Rico
Scoring by quarter: 20–**28**, **28**–26, **23**–15, **19**–10
Pts: Jones 19; Rebs: Gabriel 9 Asts: Jones 6		Pts: Alvarado 26; Rebs: Conditt IV, Romero 6 Asts: Alvarado 5

Stade Pierre-Mauroy, Lille
Attendance: 27,021
Referees: Ademir Zurapović (BIH), Takaki Kato (JPN), Martin Vulić (CRO)

31 July 2024
17:15

Boxscore

Puerto Rico	66–**107**	**Serbia**
Scoring by quarter: 12–**24**, 23–**28**, 16–**27**, 15–**28**
Pts: Ortiz 19; Rebs: Ortiz 6 Asts: Howard, Waters 3		Pts: Petrušev 15; Rebs: Jokić 15; Asts: Jokić 9

Stade Pierre-Mauroy, Lille
Attendance: 17,882
Referees: Julio Anaya (PAN), Juan Fernández (ARG), Boris Krejić (SLO)

3 August 2024
17:15

Boxscore

Puerto Rico	83–**104**	**United States**
Scoring by quarter: **29**–25, 16–**39**, 14–**23**, **24**–17
Pts: Alvarado 18; Rebs: Romero 10; Asts: Conditt IV 5		Pts: Edwards 26; Rebs: Tatum 10; Asts: James 8

Stade Pierre-Mauroy, Lille
Attendance: 27,244
Referees: Julio Anaya (PAN), Gatis Saliņš (LAT), Martin Vulić (CRO)

==== Women's tournament ====
The Puerto Rico women's national basketball team qualified for the Olympics by finishing in the top two eligible nations at the 2024 Olympic Qualifying Tournaments in Xi'an, China.

Team roster A 15-player roster was announced on 8 July 2024. The final 12-player roster was announced on 20 July.

Puerto Rico women's national basketball team – 2024 Summer Olympics roster
Players
Coaches

Pos.	No.	Name	Age – Date of birth	Height	Club	Ctr.
F	1	Tayra Meléndez	30 – 29 October 1993	1.70 m (5 ft 7 in)	Gigantes de Carolina	(Puerto Rico)
F	2	Brianna Jones	27 – 9 February 1997	1.78 m (5 ft 10 in)	Tianjin Guanlan	(China)
PG	5	Pamela Rosado (C)	38 – 30 April 1986	1.65 m (5 ft 5 in)	Montañeras de Morovis	(Puerto Rico)
C	7	Mariah Pérez	23 – 9 August 2000	1.91 m (6 ft 3 in)	Dayton Flyers	(United States)
SG	9	Allison Gibson	31 – 27 March 1993	1.91 m (6 ft 3 in)	Gigantes de Carolina	(Puerto Rico)
PF	11	Sofía Roma	27 – 21 November 1996	1.88 m (6 ft 2 in)	Montañeras de Morovis	(Puerto Rico)
PF	21	Mya Hollingshed	24 – 29 October 1999	1.93 m (6 ft 4 in)	Dinamo Sassari	(Italy)
SG	22	Arella Guirantes	26 – 15 October 1997	1.80 m (5 ft 11 in)	PF Schio	(Italy)
PG	23	Trinity San Antonio	20 – 28 October 2003	1.74 m (5 ft 9 in)	Grand Canyon Antelopes	(United States)
PF	25	Isalys Quiñones	26 – 23 October 1997	1.91 m (6 ft 3 in)	Osos de Manatí	(Puerto Rico)
C	33	India Pagán	25 – 7 January 1999	1.87 m (6 ft 2 in)	SBŠ Ostrava	(Czech Republic)
G	55	Jacqueline Benítez	27 – 6 June 1997	1.78 m (5 ft 10 in)	Explosivas de Moca	(Puerto Rico)

Head coach

- (Puerto Rico) Jerry Batista

Assistant coach(es)

- (Puerto Rico) Samuel Arill

Legend

- **(C)** Team captain
- **Club** – describes last
  club before the tournament
- **Age** – describes age
  on 28 July 2024

Group play

Pos	Team	Pld	W	L	PF	PA	PD	Pts	Qualification
1	Spain	3	3	0	223	213	+10	**6**	Quarterfinals
2	Serbia	3	2	1	201	184	+17	**5**	Quarterfinals
3	China	3	1	2	228	229	−1	**4**	
4	Puerto Rico	3	0	3	175	201	−26	**3**	

Source: FIBA
Rules for classification: 1) classification points; 2) head-to-head results; 3) head-to-head game points difference; 4) head-to-head number of game points scored.

28 July 2024
21:00

Boxscore

**Serbia**	**58**–55	Puerto Rico
Scoring by quarter: **23**–15, **20**–11, **12**–10, 3–**19**
Pts: Stanković 15; Rebs: Stanković 10; Asts: Anderson 8		Pts: San Antonio 11; Rebs: three players 6 Asts: Rosado 7

Stade Pierre-Mauroy, Lille
Attendance: 15,324
Referees: Maj Forsberg (DEN), James Boyer (AUS), Yann Davidson (MAD)

31 July 2024
11:00

Boxscore

Puerto Rico	62–**63**	**Spain**
Scoring by quarter: 9–**18**, 16–**21**, **19**–5, 18–**19**
Pts: Guirantes 15; Rebs: Hollingshed 12; Asts: Guirantes 4		Pts: Gustafson 18; Rebs: Gustafson 13; Asts: Ortiz

Stade Pierre-Mauroy, Lille
Attendance: 23,942
Referees: Andrés Bartel (URU), Maripier Malo (CAN), Yevgeniy Mikheyev (KAZ)

3 August 2024
11:00

Boxscore

**China**	**80**–58	Puerto Rico
Scoring by quarter: **17**–11, **23**–18, **22**–16, **18**–13
Pts: Li M. 18; Rebs: Han 9 Asts: Li M. 7		Pts: Guirantes 20; Rebs: Hollingshed 8 Asts: Rosado 5

Stade Pierre-Mauroy, Lille
Attendance: 26,595
Referees: Omar Bermúdez (MEX), Rabah Noujaim (LBN), Maripier Malo (CAN)

== Boxing ==
Puerto Rico entered two boxers into the Olympic tournament. Ashleyann Lozada qualified herself to Paris in featherweight division by advancing to the semifinals round at the 2023 Pan American Games in Santiago, Chile. Meanwhile, Juanma López (men's flyweight) qualified himself to Paris 2024, by winning the quota bouts round at the 2024 World Olympic Qualification Tournament 1 in Busto Arsizio, Italy.

Athlete	Event	Round of 32	Round of 16	Quarterfinals	Semifinals	Final	
Athlete	Event	Opposition Result	Opposition Result	Opposition Result	Opposition Result	Opposition Result	Rank
Juan Manuel López Jr.	Men's 51 kg	Bye	Dusmatov (UZB); **L** 0–5	Did not advance			
Ashleyann Lozada	Women's 57 kg	Bye	Ibragimova (KAZ); **W** 5–0	Szeremeta (POL); **L** 0–5	Did not advance		

== Diving ==
Puerto Rico entered one diver, Maycey Vieta into the Olympic competition.

Athlete	Event	Preliminary		Semifinal		Final	
Athlete	Event	Points	Rank	Points	Rank	Points	Rank
Maycey Vieta	Women's 10 m platform	253.90	24	Did not advance			

== Golf ==
Puerto Rico entered one male golfer into the Olympic tournament. Rafael Campos qualified directly for the games in the men's individual competitions, based on his world ranking performance, on the IGF World Rankings.

Men

Athlete	Event	Round 1	Round 2	Round 3	Round 4	Total		
Athlete	Event	Score	Score	Score	Score	Score	Par	Rank
Rafael Campos	Individual	73	70	70	67	280	−4	T30

== Judo ==
Puerto Rico qualified two judokas for the following weight classes at the Games. Adrián Gandía (men's half-middleweight, 81 kg) and María Pérez (women's middleweight, 70 kg) got qualified via quota based on IJF World Ranking List and continental quota based on Olympic point rankings.

Athlete	Event	Round of 64	Round of 32	Round of 16	Quarterfinals	Semifinals	Repechage	Final / BM	
Athlete	Event	Opposition Result	Opposition Result	Opposition Result	Opposition Result	Opposition Result	Opposition Result	Opposition Result	Rank
Adrián Gandía	Men's −81 kg	Bye	Tatalashvili (UAE); **W** 11–00	François Gauthier-Drapeau (CAN); **L** 00–10	Did not advance				
María Pérez	Women's −70 kg	—N/a	Willems (BEL); **L** 00–10	Did not advance					

== Sailing ==
Puerto Rican sailors qualified one boat in each of the following classes through the 2023 Pan American Games in Santiago, Chile.

Medal race events

Athlete	Event	Race																Net points	Final rank
Athlete	Event	1	2	3	4	5	6	7	8	9	10	11	12	13	14	15	M*	Net points	Final rank
Pedro Fernández	Men's ILCA 7	33	27	17	35	33	36	11	31	Canceled		—N/a					EL	187	34

M = Medal race; EL = Eliminated – did not advance into the medal race

== Shooting ==
Puerto Rico entered one female shooter to compete in the following event at the Games by virtue of the ISSF World Olympic Rankings.

Athlete	Event	Qualification		Final	
Athlete	Event	Score	Rank	Score	Rank
Yarimar Mercado	Women's 10 m air rifle	622.0	39	Did not advance	
Yarimar Mercado	Women's 50 m rifle 3 positions	578-29x	26	Did not advance	

== Skateboarding ==
Puerto Rico entered one male skateboarder to compete in the following event at the Games by virtue of the Olympic World Skateboarding Rankings.

Athlete	Event	Qualification		Final	
Athlete	Event	Score	Rank	Score	Rank
Steven Piñeiro	Men's park	81.54	14	Did not advance	

== Swimming ==
Puerto Rico sent two swimmers to compete at the 2024 Paris Olympics.

Athlete	Event	Heat		Semifinal		Final	
Athlete	Event	Time	Rank	Time	Rank	Time	Rank
Yeziel Morales	Men's 100 m backstroke	55.76	39	Did not advance			
Yeziel Morales	Men's 200 m backstroke	2:00.60	26	Did not advance			
Kristen Romano	Women's 200 m individual medley	2:13.32	21	Did not advance			

== Table tennis ==
Puerto Rico entered three table tennis players into Paris 2024. Adriana Díaz qualified for the games by virtue of the highest ranked eligible players from Pan American in the Olympics ranking; meanwhile Brian Afanador and Daniel González qualified through the Olympics world ranking.

Athlete	Event	Preliminary	Round 1	Round 2	Round of 16	Quarterfinals	Semifinals	Final / BM	
Athlete	Event	Opposition Result	Opposition Result	Opposition Result	Opposition Result	Opposition Result	Opposition Result	Opposition Result	Rank
Brian Afanador	Men's singles	Bye	Lin (TPE); **L** 1–4	Did not advance					
Daniel González	Men's singles	Bye	Jang (KOR); **L** 1–4	Did not advance					
Adriana Díaz	Women's singles	Bye	Lupulesku (SRB); **W** 4–0	Wang (USA); **W** 4–2	Pyon (PRK); **L** 3–4	Did not advance			

== Wrestling ==
Puerto Rico qualified four wrestler for each of the following classes into the Olympic competition. Sebastian Rivera qualified for the games by virtue of top five results through the 2023 World Championships in Belgrade, Serbia. Meanwhile, the other wrestler qualified for the games, by advancing to the final match in their own division, through the 2024 Pan American Wrestling Olympic Qualification Tournament in Acapulco, Mexico.

Key:

- VT/F (ranking points: 5–0 or 0–5) – Victory by fall.
- VB (ranking points: 5–0 or 0–5) – Victory by injury (VF for forfeit, VA for withdrawal or disqualification)
- PP (ranking points: 3–1 or 1–3) – Decision by points – the loser with technical points.
- PO (ranking points: 3–0 or 0–3) – Decision by points – the loser without technical points.
- ST (ranking points: 4–0 or 0–4) – Great superiority – the loser without technical points and a margin of victory of at least 8 (Greco-Roman) or 10 (freestyle) points.
- SP (ranking points: 4–1 or 1–4) – Technical superiority – the loser with technical points and a margin of victory of at least 8 (Greco-Roman) or 10 (freestyle) points.
- WO – Victory by walkover

Freestyle

Athlete	Event	Round of 16	Quarterfinal	Semifinal	Repechage	Final / BM	
Athlete	Event	Opposition Result	Opposition Result	Opposition Result	Opposition Result	Opposition Result	Rank
Darian Cruz	Men's −57 kg	Mohamed (EGY); **W** 4^{F}–1	Higuchi (JPN); **L** 2–12^{SP}	Did not advance	Sarlak (IRI); **W** WO	Sehrawat (IND); **L** 5–13	5
**Sebastian Rivera**	Men's −65 kg	Okorokov (AUS); **W** 12^{SP}–2	Kiyooka (JPN); **L** 6–8	Did not advance	Saculțan (MDA); **W** 15^{SP}–4	Tömör-Ochir (MGL); **W** 10–9	3rd place, bronze medalist(s)
Ethan Ramos	Men's −86 kg	Kurugliev (GRE); **L** 0–11^{ST}	Did not advance				
Jonovan Smith	Men's −125 kg	Akgül (TUR); **L** 0–10^{ST}	Did not advance				

== See also ==
- Puerto Rico at the 2024 Winter Youth Olympics
