= Maggie Pescetto =

Italian Formula Kite sailor

- Born: Maggie Eillen Pescetto; November 16, 2000 (age 25); Waterford, Ireland
- Education: IULM University of Milan
- Occupation: olympic athlete

Maggie Eillen Pescetto (born 16 November 2000) is an Italian Formula Kite olympic athlete in sailing who took the silver position at the Kite Open Africa and Middle East Championship in 2022. She was nominated for Olympic competition at formula kite in 2024.

== Life ==
Pescetto was born in Waterford in Ireland in 2000. Her mother had Irish heritage while her father was Italian. She studied business and public relations at the IULM University of Milan.

Her parents ran a pharmacy but their sport was sailing. Pescetto was introduced to the Optimist class of dinghy and her parents had ambitions for her in that sailing class when her own interest was elsewhere. She discovered kite surfing in Calabria and she and her family were hooked. Her initial and unsuccessful ambition was to compete in the youth olympics. In 2019 she switched to kitefoiling. Her first coach was Simone Vannucci and she was a member of the Yacht Club Italiano.

In 2020 she won the Italian Open category and in September 2022 she took silver at the Kite Open Africa and Middle East Championship in Mauritius. Jessie Kampman won the event with Sofia Tomasoni third.

In February 2024 she was in the Canary Islands competing at the first Fuerteventura KiteFoil International Open Cup. The British kitefoiler Ellie Aldridge won the event leading the French Jessie Kampman and with Pescetto earning the bronze medal.

In March 2024 the Formula Kite European championships took place in the Mar Menor lagoon in Spain. Pescetto was ninth and the first Italian. Italy was awarded a place but it was not immediately obvious that Pescetto would get the place as it was up to her national organisation to decide who would get the place. She was given the place based on that result.
