= Stuart McNay =

American sailor (born 1981)

Personal information
- Nickname: Stu
- Nationality: United States
- Born: August 1, 1981 (age 45) Boston, Massachusetts, U.S.
- Height: 1.73 m (5 ft 8 in)
- Weight: 65 kg (143 lb)

Sailing career
- Sport: Sailing
- College team: Yale University
- Club: Beverly Yacht Club and New York Yacht Club
- Coached by: Jay Kehoe, Zack Leonard, Nigel Cochrane, Morgan Reeser, Luther Carpenter, Thomas Barrows, Robby Bisi
- Class: Dinghy

Stuart McNay (born August 1, 1981 in Boston, Massachusetts) is an American sailor, who specialized in the 470 class. He represented the United States at five Olympics: twice with partner Graham Biehl in 2008 and 2012, twice with partner Dave Hughes in 2016 and 2020 and most recently, once with Lara Dallman-Weiss in 2024. McNay is a national, continental, and world champion and podium finisher in dinghy and keelboat classes in the role of helm. Additionally, he coaches youth, collegiate, and adult level athletes.

== Background ==
Stu learned to race at Beverly Yacht Club in Marion, Massachusetts. He was a multi time All-American in collegiate sailing at Yale University. He has raced for the US Sailing Team since 2003. As of February 2012, McNay/Biehl were ranked fourth in the world for two-person dinghy class by the International Sailing Federation, following their successes at the North American Championships and ISAF Sailing World Cup Series in Miami, Florida, United States.

Entering 2016, the Rio Olympic year, McNay/Hughes held the number three world ranking.

== Olympic sailing ==
At the 2008 Olympic Games, McNay/Biehl finished thirteenth, edging out Israel's Gideon Kliger and Udi Gal.

At the 2012 Summer Olympics in London, McNay competed for the second time as a helmsman in the men's 470 class by finishing thirteenth and receiving a berth from the ISAF World Championships in Perth, Western Australia. Teaming again with Biehl, they finished fourteenth-place finish in fleet of twenty-seven boats.

At the 2016 Olympic Games in Rio, McNay and Hughes finished 4th in the men's 470 class, with McNay as helmsman.

At the 2020 Olympic Games in Tokyo, McNay and Hughes finished 9th in the men's 470 class.

McNay will compete in the 2024 Olympic Games in Marseille, France, in the mixed 470 class with Lara Dallman-Weiss.

== Other events ==
McNay has wins and podium finishes at Sailing Cup events and continental championships, including Gold, Silver, and Bronze at consecutive European Championships - 2015, 2017, and 2016 respectively.

At the 2014 ISAF Sailing World Championships, McNay and his new partner David Hughes secured their Olympic berth with a fifth-place finish in the men's 470 class.
