= William de Smet =

Belgian sailor

Personal information
- Nationality: Belgium
- Born: 17 May 1995 (age 31) Brecht, Antwerpen, Belgium

Sailing career
- Sport: Sailing
- Classes: ILCA 7, ILCA 4
Medal record
Men's Sailing
Representing Belgium
Laser 4.7 World Championships
Bronze medal – third place	2011 San Francisco	Laser 4.7

William de Smet (born 17 May, 1995) is a Belgian sailor who competed at the 2024 Summer Olympics in the ILCA 7, where he placed 22nd.
