= Nitai Hasson =

Israeli sailor

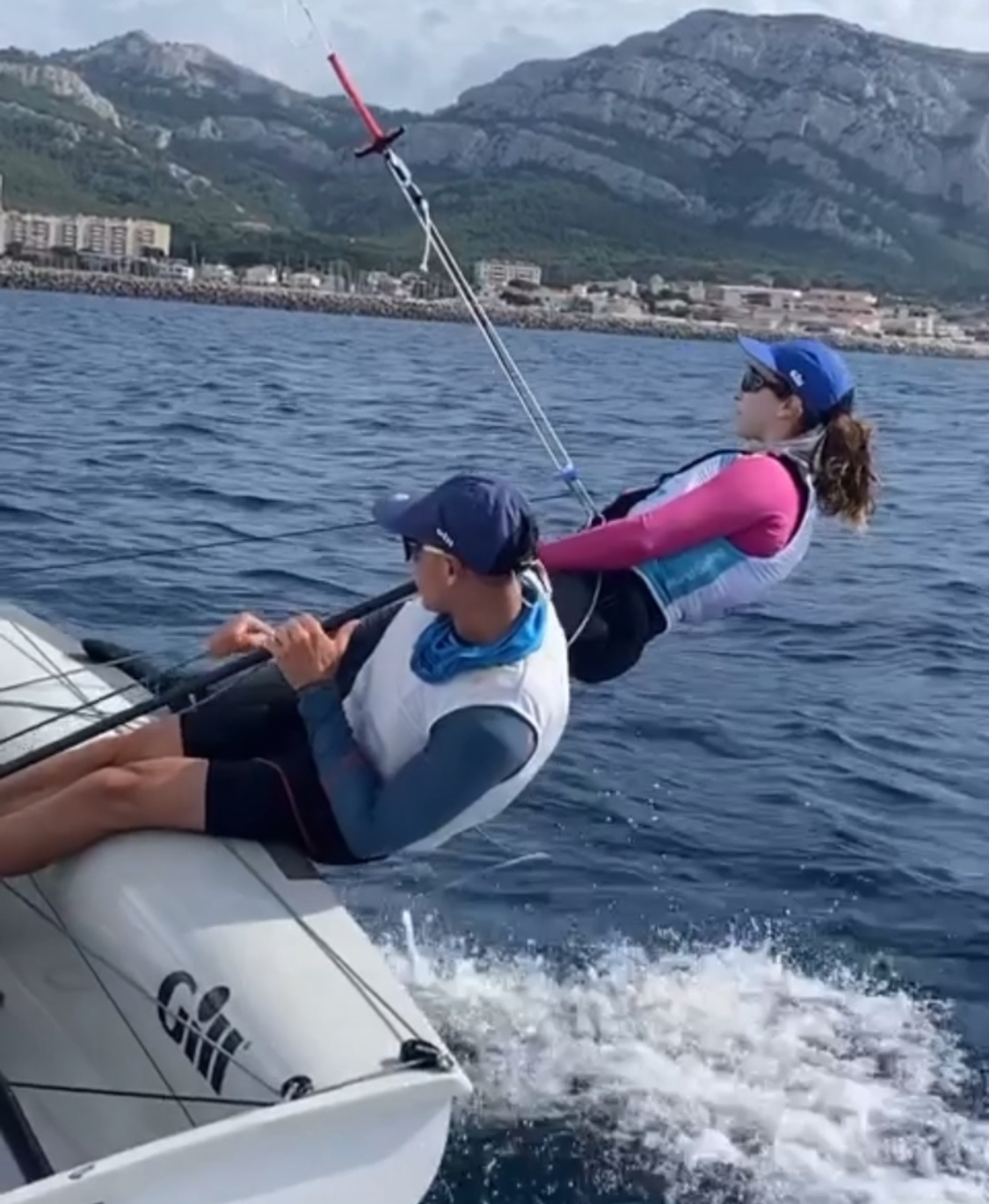
- Hasson with Noa Lasry in 2024

Personal information
- Nationality: Israeli
- Born: 15 March 1998 (age 28)

Sailing career
- Sport: Sailing
- Club: Hapoel Sdot Yam
- Class(es): 470, 420, Optimist
Medal record
Sailing
Gold medal – first place	2021	470 European Championships

Nitai Hasson (born 15 March 1998) is an Israeli competitive sailor who competes in the 470 class. He is a European champion in the mixed 470 event and represented Israel at the 2024 Summer Olympics.

== Biography ==
=== Early life ===
Hasson trained at the Hapoel Sdot Yam sailing club. During his junior career, he competed in multiple youth sailing classes, including Optimist, 420, and 470, and won Israeli youth championship titles in several of these categories.

=== Career ===
In 2017 he competed at the 2017 470 World Championships. He won the gold medal at the 470 European Championships in 2021, sailing alongside Saar Tamir in the mixed 470 class.

In August 2023, Hasson and Noa Lasry secured qualification for the 2024 Summer Olympics after reaching the medal race at the 2023 Sailing World Championships in The Hague, Netherlands. They ultimately finished 7th overall at the event.

At the 2024 Summer Olympics in Paris, Hasson competed in the mixed 470 event with Noa Lasry. The pair finished 7th overall, having reached the medal race after placing 8th in the opening series. The pair named their boat "Nova" in memory of the victims of the Nova music festival massacre.
