= Lara Nalbantoğlu =

Turkish sailor (born 2001)

Personal information
- Born: 2 October 2001 (age 24) Turkey

Sailing career
- Sport: Sailing
- Club: Fenerbahçe Sailing
- Class: 470

Lara Nalbantoğlu (born 2 October 2001) is a Turkish female sailor competing in the dinghy 470 class. She qualified to participate at the 2024 Olympics in Paris, France.

== Career ==
Nalbantoğlu is a member of the Fenerbahçe Sailing sports club.

She competed at the Last Chance Regatta of the Sailing at the 2024 Olympics Qualification for Mixed two-person dinghy 470 in Hyères, France. She qualified to represent her country in the Mixed 470 event at the 2024 Olympics in Paris, France, with her skipper teammate Deniz Çınar.
