= Carolina João =

Portuguese sailor

Personal information
- Full name: Carolina Alves da Silva João
- Nationality: Portuguese
- Born: 1 March 1997 (age 28); Lisbon, Portugal
- Height: 1.73 m (5 ft 8 in)

Sport
- Sport: Sailing

Carolina Alves da Silva João (born 1 March 1997) is a Portuguese sailor. She competed in the Laser Radial event at the 2020 Summer Olympics.

She and Diogo Costa won a place to compete in the 2024 Olympics as did the ILCA 7 sailor Eduardo Marques and the kitefoiler Mafalda Pires de Lima.
