= Lorenzo Chiavarini =

Italian sailor

Lorenzo Brando Chiavarini
Personal information
- Nationality: Italy
- Born: 17 January 1994 (age 32) Rome, Italy

Sailing career
- Sport: Sailing
- Class: ILCA 7

Lorenzo Brando Chiavarini (born 17 January 1994) is an Italian-British sailor who competed for Italy at the 2024 Summer Olympics in the ILCA 7, where he placed 9th.

Born in Rome to an Italian father and a Scottish mother, at a young age, Chiavarini moved to the Isle of Argyll, in western Scotland. Before becoming keen on sailing, he played football and golf. After starting rowing, he became a member of the local Tarbet club and began competing in races.

Competing for the United Kingdom, in 2014, he won both the U21 World and European titles in the Laser Standard. In 2019, he earned a gold at the 2019 European Championships, and an eighth-place finish at the World Championships. In 2020, he got a bronze medal at the European Championships. In this period, he suffered two serious injuries, to his wrist and back. In 2022, he changed his sporting nationality, switching to Italy.

Chiavarini holds a degree in Navigation and Maritime Sciences from the University of Plymouth.
