= Duko Bos =

Dutch sailor

Personal information
- Nationality: Netherlands
- Born: 22 April 1995 (age 31) Rotterdam, Netherlands

Sailing career
- Sport: Sailing
- Class: ILCA 7

Duko Bos (born 22 April, 1995) is a Dutch sailor who competed at the 2024 Summer Olympics in the ILCA 7, where he placed 15th.
