= Jonatán Vadnai =

Hungarian sailor

Personal information
- Nationality: Hungarian
- Born: 27 March 1998 (age 28) Veszprém, Hungary

Sailing career
- Sport: Sailing
- Class: ILCA 7
Medal record
Representing Hungary
Sailing
Youth Olympic Games
Bronze medal – third place	2014 Nanjing	Boy's Byte

Jonatán Vadnai (born 27 March 1998) is a Hungarian sailor who competed at the 2024 Summer Olympics, placing 4th in the ILCA 7 competition.

At the 2014 Youth Olympic Games he finished 3rd in the Byte CII competition.
