= Michał Krasodomski =

Polish sailor

Personal information
- Nationality: Poland
- Born: 30 April 2003 (age 23) Koszalin, Poland

Sailing career
- Sport: Sailing
- Classes: ILCA 7, Finn

Michał Krasodomski (born 30 April, 2003) is a Polish sailor who competed at the 2024 Summer Olympics in the ILCA 7, where he placed 40th. Since the Games, Krasodomski has moved into the Finn class. He placed 4th at the 2026 European Championship.
