= Maud Jayet =

Swiss sailor

Personal information
- Nationality: Swiss
- Born: 3 April 1996 (age 29) Lausanne, Switzerland
- Height: 1.73 m (5 ft 8 in)

Sport

Sailing career
- Class(es): ILCA 6, ILCA 4
- Club: Société Nautique de Genève

Maud Jayet (born 3 April 1996) is a Swiss competitive sailor.

She competed in the Laser Radial event at the 2020 Summer Olympics, held July–August 2021 in Tokyo.

Jayet was chosen to represent Switzerland at the 2024 Olympics with the foilers Elia Colombo and Elena Lengwiler in the national sailing team of Sébastien Schneiter and Arno de Planta and the 470 dinghy mixed pair of Yves Mermod and Maja Siegenthaler.
