= Sailing at the 2024 Summer Olympics – Laser =

Men's Laser at the Games of the XXXIII Olympiad
- Venues: Marseille, France
- Dates: 1–7 August 2024
- Competitors: 43 from 43 nations

Medalists
1st place, gold medalist(s)		Matthew Wearn	Australia
2nd place, silver medalist(s)		Pavlos Kontides	Cyprus
3rd place, bronze medalist(s)		Stefano Peschiera	Peru

The Laser competition at the 2024 Summer Olympics was the men's one-person dinghy event and was held in Marseille, France, from 1 to 7 August 2024. 43 sailors from 43 nations were due to compete in 11 races, including one medal-race where points were doubled. However, due to low winds, races 9 and 10 were cancelled. The medal race was supposed to take place on 6 August but was delayed to 7 August.

== Schedule ==
Thu 1 Aug	Fri 2 Aug	Sat 3 Aug	Sun 4 Aug	Mon 5 Aug	Tue 6 Aug	Wed 7 Aug
Race 1 Race 2	Race 3 Race 4	Race 5 Race 6	Race 7 Race 8	~~Race 9~~; ~~Race 10~~	~~Medal race~~ Postponed	Medal race

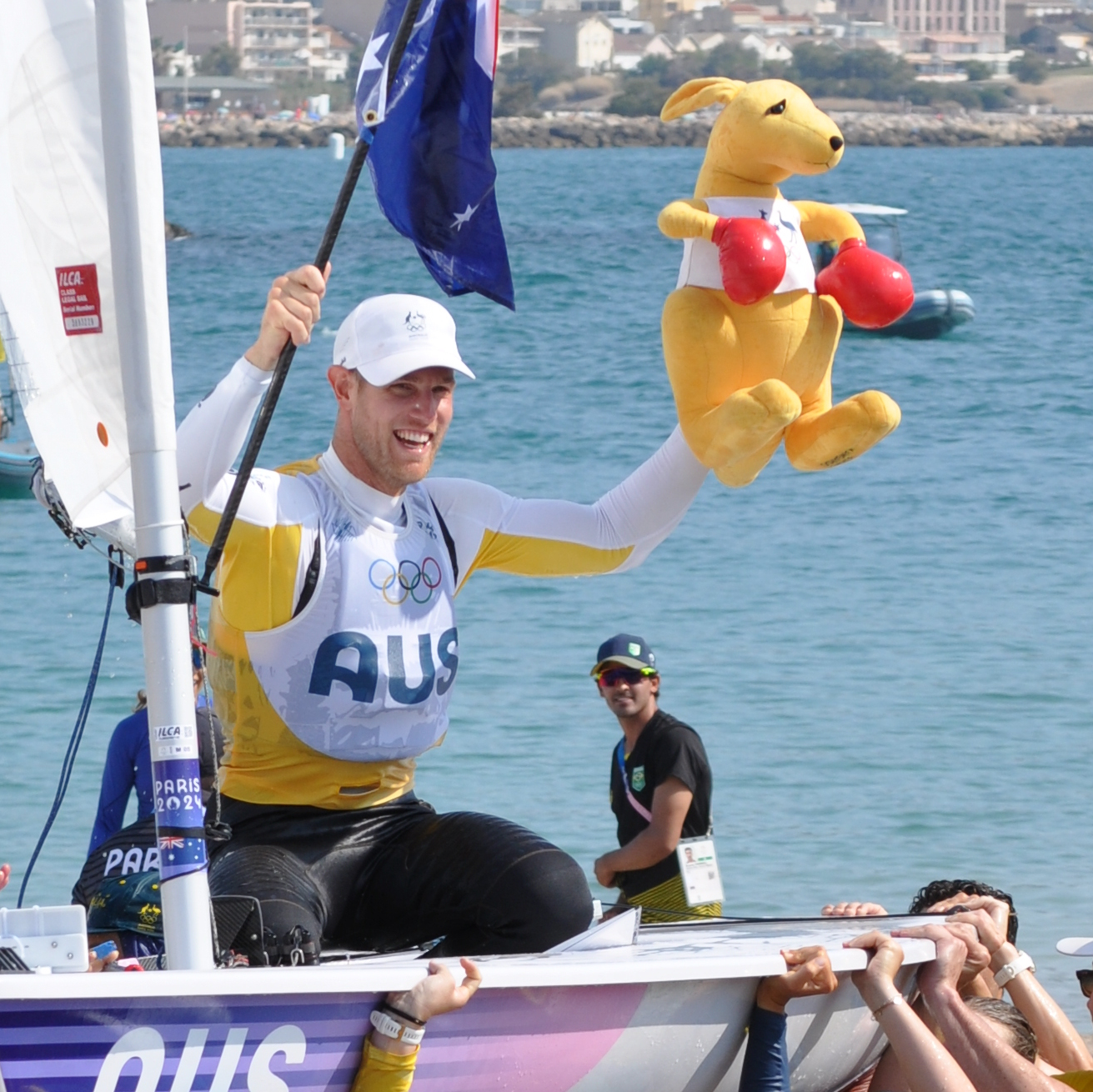
Wearn celebrating his victory in the event

== Results ==
Official results

Results of individual races
Pos	Helmsman	Country	I	II	III	IV	V	VI	VII	VIII	MR	Tot	Pts
Gold medal	Matthew Wearn	Australia	12	2	1	18^{†}	1	2	10	10	2	58	40
Silver medal	Pavlos Kontides	Cyprus	17	5	27^{†}	5	10	5	3	7	4	83	56
Bronze medal	Stefano Peschiera	Peru	6	1	14	11	20^{†}	14	12	4	18	100	80
4	Jonatán Vadnai	Hungary	16	12	21^{†}	13	5	12	8	12	6	105	84
5	Hermann Tomasgaard	Norway	22^{†}	16	2	17	15	19	6	2	8	107	85
6	Michael Beckett	Great Britain	19	9	15	8	4	4	44^{†} BFD	8	20	131	87
7	Thomas Saunders	New Zealand	11	17	10	7	19	3	44^{†} BFD	13	10	134	90
8	Clemente Seguel	Chile	2	28^{†}	18	10	8	17	18	9	12	122	94
9	Lorenzo Chiavarini	Italy	25	21	4	6	17	27^{†}	5	19	14	138	111
10	Finn Lynch	Ireland	9	25	26^{†}	22	12	7	13	11	16	141	115
11	Eduardo Marques	Portugal	5	11	31	15	35	1	44^{†} BFD	3	-	145	101
12	Jean-Baptiste Bernaz	France	8	19	5	31^{†}	3	20	16	30	-	132	101
13	Philipp Buhl	Germany	7	30	3	28	26	11	44^{†} BFD	1	-	150	106
14	Milivoj Dukić	Montenegro	3	23	13	33^{†}	7	32	2	26	-	139	106
15	Duko Bos	Netherlands	1	20	29^{†}	27	14	16	4	28	-	139	110
16	Juan Ignacio Maegli	Guatemala	21	22	8	3	9	33	44^{†} BFD	15	-	155	111
17	Žan Luka Zelko	Slovenia	27	10	33^{†}	23	2	21	14	16	-	146	113
18	Vishnu Saravanan	India	10	34^{†}	20	19	21	13	7	24	-	148	114
19	Filip Jurišić	Croatia	13	4	32^{†}	1	31	24	28	14	-	147	115
20	Enrique Arathoon	El Salvador	4	33	16	34^{†}	16	15	19	17	-	154	120
21	Joaquín Blanco Albalat	Spain	14	35	12	20	25	10.2; DPI	44^{†} BFD	5	-	165.2	121.2
22	William de Smet	Belgium	20	7	34	4	13	35	44^{†} RET	18	-	175	131
23	Yiğit Yalçın Çitak	Turkey	18	13	37	14	22	9	44^{†} BFD	20	-	177	133
24	Nicholas Halliday	Hong Kong	35^{†}	14	35	16	18	6	15	32	-	171	136
25	Ryan Lo	Singapore	15	8	11	29	23	25	44^{†} BFD	27	-	182	138
26	Ha Jee-min	South Korea	30	32	40^{†}	9	24	22	1	22	-	180	140
27	Francisco Guaragna Rigonat	Argentina	28	26	24	44^{†} UFD	6	18	24	23	-	193	149
28	Bruno Fontes	Brazil	31	31	6	30	32	34^{†}	25	6	-	195	161
29	Luc Chevrier	Saint Lucia	24	36^{†}	19	25	11	28	27	29	-	199	163
30	Omer Vered Vilenchik	Israel	38	3	7	40^{†}	36	37	20	25	-	206	166
31	Karl-Martin Rammo	Estonia	34	6	28	39^{†}	27	29	9	33	-	205	166
32	Khairulnizam Afendy	Malaysia	32	15	22	21	30	26	22	34^{†}	-	202	168
33	Just Van Aanholt	Aruba	26	39^{†}	25	24	34	10	23	36	-	217	178
34	Pedro Luis Fernández Gamboa	Puerto Rico	33	27	17	35	33	36^{†}	11	31	-	223	187
35	Arthit Mikhail Romanyk	Thailand	39^{†}	24	30	26	29	30	21	35	-	234	195
36	Johan Lundgaard Schubert	Denmark	29	29	39	37	28	23	44^{†} BFD	21	-	250	206
37	Kaarle Tapper	Finland	23	18	9	32	44^{†} DNC	44; DNC	44; DNC	44; DNC	-	258	214
38	Thad Lettsome	British Virgin Islands	40^{†}	38	36	2	38	38	26	37	-	255	215
39	Filipe André	Angola	41	42^{†}	23	12	40	40	30	41	-	269	227
40	Michal Krasodomski	Poland	36	37	42^{†}	38	37	31	17	38	-	276	234
41	Aly Badawy	Egypt	37	40	38	36	41^{†}	41	29	39	-	301	260
42	Eroni Leilua	Samoa	42	41	43^{†}	42	39	39	31	40	-	317	274
43	Viliame Ratulu	Fiji	43^{†}	43	41	41	42	42	32	42	-	326	283

Scoring system: low-point system;
Legend: – Qualified for medal race(s); BFD – Black flag disqualification; DNC – Did not come to the starting area; DNF – Did not finish; DPI – Discretionary penalty imposed; OCS – On the course side of the starting line; RDG – Redress given; RET – Retired; UFD – "U" flag disqualification; † – Discarded race not counted in the overall result;
