= Nicholas Halliday =

Hong Kong sailor (born 1999)

Nicholas Halliday 貝俊龍
Personal information
- Nationality: Hong Kong
- Born: Nicholas Bezy; 18 June 1999 (age 27) Hong Kong

Sport
- Country: Hong Kong
- Sport: Sailing
- Rank: 22 (June 2024)

Nicholas Halliday (Chinese: 貝俊龍; born 18 June 1999) is a Hong Kong sailor who competes in the ILCA 7 class. He represented Hong Kong at the 2024 Paris Summer Olympics in the Laser Standard event, finishing 24th. He won gold at the 2023 ASAF Asian Sailing Championships in Thailand.
