= Breiana Whitehead =

Australian kitefoiler

Personal information
- Nationality: Australian
- Born: 1 July 2000 (age 25) Townsville, Queensland

Sailing career
- Sport: Sailing
- Coached by: Shane Smith; Danny Fuller
- Class: Formula Kite
Competition record
Women's sailing
Representing Australia
World Championships
Bronze medal – third place	2019 Lake Garda	Formula Kite

Breiana Whitehead (born 1 July 2000) is an Olympic kitesurfer from Australia. She was the first athlete selected for the Australian team for the 2024 Summer Olympics in Paris.

== Early life ==
Whitehead was born in Townsville, Queensland, in 2000. She has one younger brother, Scott Whitehead, who is also a kitesurfer. When she was two years old, their father Murray, who is a boatbuilder, began to introduce her to sailing, and she began sailing on her own when she was eight years old. She began racing at the age of ten.

== Career ==
=== 2019 ===
Whitehead received a bronze medal in the 2019 Formula Kite World Championships at Lake Garda, Italy, which was her first medal received in an international competition.

=== 2020 ===
Alongside her brother Scott, Whitehead competed in the 2020 Australian Kitefoiling Championships in Melbourne. She won the teams, women's, and Open National kitefoiling events, and was ranked sixth overall.

=== 2023 ===
Whitehead competed at the 2023 Formula Kite World Championships in The Hague, Netherlands, where she placed eleventh, earning a berth for Australia at the 2024 Summer Olympics in Paris.

=== 2024 ===
Whitehead was the overall winner of the 53rd Trofeo Princesa Sofía (part of the 2024 Sailing World Cup), receiving the gold medal in Women's Formula Kite. She beat the American Daniela Moroz, who took second place, and the German Leonie Meyer, who took third. She finished fifth in the 2024 Formula Kite World Championships in Hyères, France.

She was the first athlete selected for the Australian team for the 2024 Summer Olympics in Paris, which was the first time that kitesurfing was represented as an Olympic sport. She placed 7th in the Women's Formula Kite event.

Whitehead received the 2024 Female Australian Sailor of the Year award for her accomplishments at the Trofeo Princesa Sofía and the Summer Olympics.

== Personal life ==
In 2022, Whitehead graduated from James Cook University with a Bachelor of Mechanical Engineering degree. She designs her own boards.
