= Sofia Tomasoni =

Italian kitesurfer

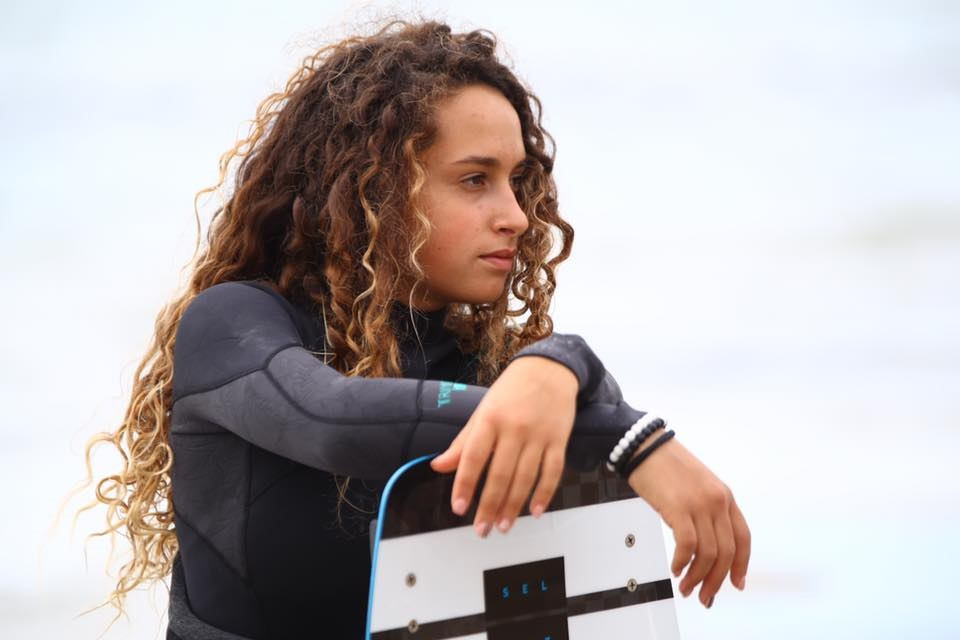
- Tomasoni in 2017

Personal information
- Nationality: Italian
- Born: 27 February 2002 (age 24) Bologna, Italy
- Height: 1.67 m (5 ft 6 in)
- Weight: 58 kg (128 lb)

Sport
- Country: Italy
- Sport: Kitesurfing
Medal record
Representing Italy
Youth Olympic Games
Gold medal – first place	2018 Buenos Aires	IKA Twin Tip Racing
IKA Twin Tip Racing Open World Championships
Gold medal – first place	2018 Gizzeria	IKA Twin Tip Racing
IKA Twin Tip Racing Youth World Championships
Silver medal – second place	2018 Bo'ao	IKA Twin Tip Racing
Gold medal – first place	2017 Barra Grande	IKA Twin Tip Racing

Sofia Tomasoni (born 27 February 2002 in Bologna) is an Italian kitesurfer and winner of the women's Youth Olympic title in Twin Tip Racing in 2018.

== Life ==
Tomasoni was born in 2002. She competed in the Youth Olympics in 2018 where kitesurfing (Twin Tip) was a new sport. She became the first woman to ever win an Olympic title in kitesurfing. Both Nina Font and Poema Newland were the runners-up taking silver. She ranked first in the world for Twin Tip Racing in the years 2017 and 2018 before switching to the Formula Kite discipline.

== Achievements ==
Year	Position	Kitesurfing class	Event
2022		IKA Formula Kite	(Mauritius) Kite Open Africa and Middle East Championship
2020		IKA Formula Kite	(Italy) Italian Championship
2019		IKA Formula Kite	(Italy) Italian Championship
2018		IKA Twin Tip Racing	(Argentina) Youth Olympic Games
2018		IKA Twin Tip Racing	(Italy) Italian Youth Championship
2018		IKA Twin Tip Racing	(Italy) Open World Championships
2018		IKA Twin Tip Racing	(China) World Youth Championship
2018		IKA Twin Tip Racing	(Morocco) Youth Olympic Qualifiers
2017		IKA Twin Tip Racing	(Brazil) World Youth Championship
2017		IKA Twin Tip Racing	(Italy) National Youth Championship
2016		IKA Freestyle	(Italy) IKA World Championship
2016		IKA Freestyle	(Italy) Italian Championship
2015		IKA Twin Tip Racing	(Italy) Youth Italian Championship

== See also ==
- Girl medallists at the Sailing Youth Olympic Games.
