= Pedro Luis Fernández Gamboa =

Puerto Rican sailor

William de Smet
Personal information
- Nationality: Puerto Rico
- Born: 12 September 1997 (age 28) Cuba

Sailing career
- Sport: Sailing
- Class: ILCA 7

Pedro Luis Fernández Gamboa (born 12 September, 1997) is a Cuban born Puerto Rican sailor who competed at the 2024 Summer Olympics in the ILCA 7, where he placed 34th.
