= Leonie Meyer =

German kitesurfer

- Born: February 3, 1993 (age 33)
- Education: Kiel University
- Occupations: medical student and kitefoiler

Leonie Meyer (born February 3, 1993) is a German sailor, medical student and prospective Olympic kitesurfer.

== Life ==
Meyer had been interested in sailing as a child. She was raised by sporting parents in Osnabrück and her initial success was with a 49er . In 2014 she and Elena Stoffers won a bronze medal in Helsinki at the European 49er Championship. They had both been kitesurfing together in 2013.

Meyer moved to Kiel in 2012 as part of her unsuccessful plan to compete at the 2016 Olympics. In Kiel she started to study at Kiel University to become a doctor and she changed her main sailing interest to kitesurfing.

In 2020 she and Florian Gruber formed a Mixed Relay Formula Kite team who won silver at the Formula Kite Championships in Traunsee in Austria. She had a child in 2021 and she is supported by the Deutsche Sporthilfe foundation and Deutsche Bank. She receives funding targeted at German athletes, like her and Paul Kohlhoff, who are parents by the German Sailing Association.

In the European Formula Kite Championships in 2023 she was a semi-finalist and she was ranked ninth.

Meyer was third in the 53rd Trofeo Princesa Sofia which is part of the 2024 Sailing World Cup, receiving the bronze medal in Women's Formula Kite. She was beaten by the American Daniela Moroz, who took silver, and the Australian Breiana Whitehead, who won the event.

In April she was competing in Hyères in France at "Olympic Week", the last-chance event where kitesurfers were competing for the last five places for the 2024 Paris Olympics. Meyer was there, but she was one of the sailors who had already been given a place.
