= Maja Siegenthaler =

Swiss sailor

Personal information
- Nationality: Swiss
- Born: 11 November 1992 (age 33) Spiez, Switzerland
- Height: 172 cm (5 ft 8 in)
- Weight: 66 kg (146 lb)

Sport

Sailing career
- Class(es): 470, 420
- Club: Thunersee Yacht Club

Maja Siegenthaler (born 11 November 1992) is a Swiss competitive sailor. She and Linda Fahrni competed for Switzerland at the 2016 Summer Olympics in the women's 470 class, and at the 2020 Summer Olympics in the women's 470 class.

Siegenthaler was chosen to represent Switzerland at the 2024 Olympics as the 470 dinghy mixed pair with Yves Mermod. They joined Maud Jayet and the foilers Elia Colombo and Elena Lengwiler in the national sailing team with Sébastien Schneiter and Arno de Planta.
