= Mafalda Pires de Lima =

Portuguese kitefoiler

- Born: 14 April 1998 (age 27)
- Education: Nova School of Business and Economics
- Known for: Portugal's first woman kitesurfing champion

Mafalda Pires de Lima (born 14 April 1998) is a Portuguese kitefoiler. She has been sailing since the age of ten and when it was agreed that Formula Kite was to be an Olympic sport then she began to enjoy the difficult sport. She was Portugal's first woman kitesurfing champion.

== Life ==
de Lima was born in 1998 into a family who were involved in sailing and she began sailing Optimist dinghies when she was ten.

She is a member of the Clube de Vela Atlântico in the city of Porto. She was later involved in sailing Laser dinghies. She found kitefoiling so intriguing because it is difficult. She was approached by Pedro Afonso to get involved in 2019 when Formula Kite was first agreed as an Olympic sport five years before the Paris Olympics. She gained a silver medal at the Snipe World Championships in the same year (2019).

In September 2021 she became Portugal's first woman kitesurfing champion at the contest near Fuseta in the Algarve. She was then a student at the Nova School of Business & Economics. She has also been involved as a crewmember of an SSL47 which at 47 feet is a lot larger than her former or kitefoil crafts.

The last five of the 20 places for women kitefoilers at the Paris Olympics were awarded at the Last Chance Regatta in April 2024 to the Austrian Surfer Alina Kornelli, the Swiss surfer Elena Lengwiler, Julia Damasiewicz of Poland, Derin Atakan of Turkey and de Lima took the twentieth place. The Portuguese sailing authorities confirmed that she was to be their competitor at the Olympics in 2024 joining the national team of Diogo Costa and Carolina João and the ILCA 7 sailor Eduardo Marques.
