= Elena Lengwiler =

Swiss ice hockey player and kitefoiler

- Born: Elena Bosshard; June 1, 1996 (age 29); Wald
- Education: Sports Management at University of Applied Sciences of the Grisons
- Occupation: Ice hockey player turned kitefoiler
- Spouse: Jonas

Elena Lengwiler born Elena Bosshard (born 1 June 1996) is a Swiss ice hockey player and a nominated kitefoiler for the 2024 Olympics. She was fourth in the 2024 European Championships and she represented Switzerland in Formula Kite at the 2024 Olympics.

== Life ==
Lengwiler was born in Wald, Zürich in 1996. Elena Lengwiler began her athletic career at the Steckborn Segel Club and later spent several years working as a support staff member for Sailability in Arbon. She then switched to ice hockey and played in the U18 league before turning professional, competing until 2018 for the ZSC-Lions in Switzerland's second-highest league. Since 2018, she has been kitesurfing, and since 2021, she has been riding the foil. She then learns that Formula Kite is set to become an Olympic discipline in 2024—and her interest is piqued. At the beginning of 2023, Lengwiler is selected to join the Swiss Olympic Sailing Team.

== Career ==
In March 2024 she nearly gained a medal at the Formula Kite European Championships in the Mar Menor lagoon in Spain when she was fourth. She was described as the most improved athlete and an Olympic medal contender. The top three finishers Lauriane Nolot, Jessie Kampman and Poema Newland were all French riders competing intensely. It was noted that Lengwiler was their only peer as she had transformed herself from an also-ran into a contender. An Olympic place for Switzerland was expected.

At the Olympic Last Chance Regatta at the end of April 2024 off Hyères in France she was first. She qualified Switzerland to take part in the 2024 Summer Olympics in Paris. Fifteen of the twenty places had already been allocated to fifteen countries and their chosen riders. The last five places were awarded at the Last Chance Regatta to the Austrian surfer Alina Kornelli, Julia Damasiewicz of Poland, the Turkish Derin Atakan, Mafalda Pires de Lima of Portugal and Lengwiler. Lengwiler was chosen as the sailor to represent Switzerland at the 2024 Olympics joining fellow foiler Elia Colombo in the national sailing team of Sébastien Schneiter and Arno de Planta, Maud Jayet, and the 470 dinghy mixed pair of Yves Mermod and Maja Siegenthaler.

In the Summer Olympic Games 2024, the pinnacle of her current career, she achieved an Olympic diploma by finishing in 6th place.

== Personal life ==
In 2023, she completed her sports management studies and lives with her husband Jonas Lengwiler at Lake Walen. She is a member of the Gstaad Sailing Club.
