= Chen Jingyue =

Chinese Formula Kite athlete

Jingyue Chen
Personal information
- Born: 28 December 2000 (age 25) Pingtan Island, China
- Height: 1.70 m (5 ft 7 in)

Sailing career
- Country: Chinese
- Sport: Sailing
- Class: IKA - Formula Kite
Medal record
Women's kite surfing
Representing China
Asian Games
Gold medal – first place	2022 Hangzhou	Women's Kite

Jingyue Chen (born 28 December 2000) is a Chinese Formula Kite professional athlete who became the Asian, and the Asia & Oceania, champion in 2023.

== Life ==
Chen was born on Pingtan Island in about 2001 and brought up there. When she was twelve, she was introduced to the sport of kiteboarding. She was chosen because she was athletic and local to the site chosen by Zhai Dahui to develop the water and wind based sport. She began to learn how to use a surfboard powered by a kite. The board was powered by its rider as they held a large kite. In time the board could be fitted with a hydrofoil so that it would rise out of the air. This sport was kitefoiling and one interpretation would become an Olympic sport named Formula Kite for the 2024 Olympics.

She competed in September 2023 in the postponed 19th Asian Games at Pingtan Island and she took the gold medal. The Games began with the kite competitions at the Ningbo Xiangshan Sailing Centre. Chen won the event becoming the Asian champion with Thailand's Benyapa Jantawan at silver and the bronze earned by Lee Young-eun of South Korea.

In November 2023 the Formula Kite Asia & Oceania Championships was being held in Shenzhen in China. The championship was won by Chen and her fellow Chinese kitesurfer, Wan Li, took silver with the Polish surfer Julia Damasiewicz third.

Formula Kite was contested for the first time as an Olympic sport at the 2024 Summer Olympics. Chen was chosen as one of the forty contestants representing China after she came eighth at the Sailing World Championships in The Hague in August 2023.
