= Annelous Lammerts =

Dutch Formula Kite competitor and designated Olympian

Personal information
- Born: 1 November 1993 (age 32) Rockanje, Netherlands

Sport
- Sport: Kite foiling
Medal record
Women's kitefoiling
Representing the Netherlands
Olympic Games
Bronze medal – third place	2024 Paris	Formula Kite

Annelous Lammerts (born 1 November 1993) is a Dutch Formula Kite competitor and designated Olympian. She won the 2022 Hempel World Cup Allianz Regatta and the silver medal at the 2023 Formula Kite European Championships. Lammerts won a bronze medal at the 2024 Paris Olympics in the inaugural women's Formula Kite event.

== Life ==
Lammerts was born in the village of Rockanje in 1993. She lived 17 km from the beach which enabled her to indulge her love of kiting on every windy day after cycling to the beach. When she was working it was at a kiteshop which allowed her to practise more during her breaks. Holidays were to Brazil so that she could practice more during the Dutch winters. She took to park style kiteboarding and in 2017 she took the Ladies Kite Park League title.

Kite foiling was selected in 2019 as a new sport for the 2024 Summer Olympics in Paris.

In June 2022 Lammerts won the Hempel World Cup Allianz Regatta at Lelystad in light winds beating the Spaniard Gisela Pulido who took silver, the Israeli Gal Zukerman who took the bronze place and Maya Ashkenazi was fourth. This was her first major regatta victory.

Lammerts took the silver medal in the 2023 Formula Kite European Championships in Portsmouth which the British athlete Ellie Aldridge won. The third place went to the French Poema Newland. Lauriane Nolot, the world champion was notably not in Portsmouth for that event.

Lammerts was selected to compete at the 2024 Olympics and a new suit was developed for her by Delft University of Technology. The suit was designed using new materials, expertise and a wind tunnel. The suit creates aerodynamic improvements that can save seconds as she surfs at speeds up to 70 kph. The suit also resists cuts which are a hazard when windfoiling.

At the 2024 Olympics, Lammerts, took the bronze medal in the inaugural women's Formula kite event in Marseilles and Ellie Aldridge took the gold medal. The French surfer Lauriane Nolet had fallen in one of the final races, but her earlier results gave her the silver medal.
