= Lara Dallman-Weiss =

American sailor

Lara Dallman-Weiss OLY
Personal information
- Born: January 30, 1989 (age 37) Shoreview, Minnesota, U.S.
- Height: 5 ft 9 in (175 cm)

Sailing career
- Sport: Sailing
- Classes: 470, Snipe, J/70, Nacra 17

Lara Dallman-Weiss (/waɪs/; born January 30, 1989) is an American sailor. She qualified to represent Team USA in the 2020 Summer Olympics in Tokyo, competing in the Women's Two Person Dinghy - 470 event.

== Career ==
She grew up sailing at White Bear Yacht Club. She graduated from Eckerd College.

- 2016 Farr 40 North American Champion on Flash Gordon
- 1st in the C&C 30 class at the 2016 Key West Race Week
- 1st at the 2016 Etchells Pacific Coast Championship as main trimmer
- 3rd at the 2014 Women's Match Race World Championship as part of the Epic Racing team.
