= Derin Atakan =

Turkish kitesurfer (born 2006)

Personal information
- Born: 16 June 2006 (age 20) Istanbul, Turkey

Sailing career
- Sport: Sailing
- Club: Fenerbahçe Sailing
- Class: Formula Kite
Medal record
Women's Kitesurfing Formula Kite
Representing Turkey
Youth World Championships
Gold medal – first place	2023 Búzios	Y Formula Kite
Bronze medal – third place	2022 The Hague	Y Formula Kite

Derin Atakan (born 16 June 2006) is a Turkish female kitesurfer competing in the Formula Kite class. She qualified to participate at the 2024 Olympics in Paris, France.

== Career ==
Atakan was a member of Urla Marine Club in İzmir, before she transferred to Fenerbahçe Sailing.

She became Turkish champion in the U21 Girls category of the Formula Kite at the 2022-23 TYF League. She won the first leg of the 2023-24 TYF League in Urla, İzmir. She was admitted to the Turkey national team of Formula Kite, which was included for the first time into the Sailing at the 2024 Summer Olympics.

She took part for the first time at the Youth Sailing World Championships held in Al-Musannah, Oman, and placed fourth. She won the bronze medal in the girls Formula Kite event in 2022 at the Youth Sailing World Championships in The Hague, Netherlands, and the gold medal in 2023 in Búzios, Brazil.

She competed and ranked 4th in the 2024 Last Chance Regatta of the Sailing at the 2024 Summer Olympics – Qualification in Hyères, France. The last five of the 20 places for women kitefoilers at the Olympics were awarded at the Last Chance Regatta in April 2024 to the Austrian Surfer Alina Kornelli, the Swiss surfer Elena Lengwiler, Julia Damasiewicz of Poland, Mafalda Pires de Lima of Portugal and Atakan qualified to represent her country at the 2024 Olympics in Paris, France.

In July 2024 she was at the Formula Kite Youth World Championship in the southern Italian town of Gizzeria. The four surfers in the final were her, the French woman Lysa Caval, Catalina Turienzo and Magdalena Woyciechowska from Poland. The Argentine Catalina Turienzo won the race. The former champion Lysa Caval was second and Atakan took the Bronze medal

== Personal life ==
Derin Atakan was born in Istanbul on 16 June 2006.
