= Ellie Aldridge =

British windfoiling sailor (born 1996)

Ellie Aldridge MBE
Personal information
- Full name: Eleanor Evangeline R. Aldridge
- Born: 29 December 1996 (age 29) Poole, Dorset, England

Sport
- Sport: Kitefoiling
- Club: Parkstone Yacht Club
Medal record
Women's kitefoiling
Representing Great Britain
Olympic Games
| Gold medal – first place | 2024 Paris | Formula Kite |

Eleanor Evangeline R. Aldridge MBE (born 29 December 1996) is a British sailor from Dorset who competes in women's kite foiling. She won the 2023 Formula Kite European Championships and took the silver that year in the World Championships. At the 2024 Paris Olympics, Aldridge won a gold medal in the women's Formula Kite event.

== Early life ==
Aldridge was born on 29 December 1996 in Poole, Dorset. She was first introduced to sailing when she was seven years old and joined the Parkstone Yacht Club where she experimented with sailing dinghies.

== Career ==
In 2021 she beat French windfoiler Lauriane Nolot into third place at the Formula Kite World Championships in Torregrande in Sardinia. It was won by American Daniela Moroz with Aldridge in second.

In 2022 she took the silver medal in the KiteFoil World Series Traunsee in Austria. She was beaten by the Polish surfer Julia Damasiewicz.

Aldridge led the UK contingent at the World Championships in August 2023 in The Hague. Lauriane Nolot won the event and Aldridge took the silver. She was followed in third and fourth place by fellow British competitors, Lily Young and Katie Dabson. In 2023 she was training with four other "GB Kite Girls" in Weymouth. Katie Dabson and the other "GB Kite Girls" were assisting her training for the Olympics. The "GB Kite Girls" were Aldridge, Maddy Anderson, Jemima Crathorne, Katie Dabson and Lily Young.

She won the 2023 Formula Kite European Championships in Portsmouth beating the Dutch Annelous Lammerts and the French Poema Newland. This was her first significant win and she took first, despite a crash. Lauriane Nolot, the world champion was not in Portsmouth for the event. There was an Olympic rehearsal type event later in Paris, in 2024, when she came second to Nolot.

In March 2024 the Formula Kite European championships took place in Spain. Aldridge finished in fifth place just ahead of Lily Young, however in May at the Formula Kite World Sailing Championships she came second to the Frenchwoman Lauriane Nolot.

The new sport of kite foiling which had been selected in 2019. Aldridge was then announced as a member of Great Britain's Formula Kite team. In kitesurfing, there is a large focus on having a higher weight to provide an advantage, so Aldridge focused on gaining weight for the 2024 Olympics; she cut down on exercise in order to gain 17% extra weight. She has stated that this means that cannot do other things she enjoys like cycling and eating healthily. All competitors are making similar sacrifices and she questions if the sport can continue if it requires riders to be so unhealthy. She went on to win gold in the women's Formula kite event. Lauriane Nolot had fallen in one of the final races but her earlier results gave her the silver medal. The Dutch surfer, Annelous Lammerts, took the bronze medal.

She was a member of the team of women who competed for the Women's America's Cup. Other team members were Tash Bryant, Hattie Rogers, Anna Burnet and Saskia Tidey and they were captained by Hannah Mills. The team made it through the heats and their boat Athena Pathway was beaten in the finals in October by the Italians.

In the New Years Honours, Aldridge became a Member of the Most Excellent Order of the British Empire together with other TeamGB team mates 800m runner Keely Hodgkinson and trampoline Olympic champion Bryony Page. Later that month it was announced that she and Ben Cornish were to join the Emirates Great Britain SailGP Team training for a strategist role.
