= Sailing at the 2024 Summer Olympics =

Sailing at the Games of the XXXIII Olympiad
- Venue: Marseille Marina
- Dates: 28 July – 8 August 2024
- No. of events: 10 (4 men, 4 women, 2 mixed)
- Competitors: 330 (165 men and 165 women)

Sailing competitions at the 2024 Summer Olympics were held from July 28 to August 8 at Marseille Marina. The number of sailors competing across ten different events at these Games has been reduced from 350 to 330, with an equal distribution between men and women. Furthermore, several significant changes are instituted in the sailing program for Paris 2024 to reinforce gender equality and vast diversity among the nations in the qualifying process.

== Medal events and equipment ==
- For the Men's Single-handed Dinghy event, the equipment will be the ILCA 7
- For the Women's Single-handed Dinghy event, the equipment will be the ILCA 6
- For the Mixed Double-handed Dinghy event, the equipment will be the 470
- For the Mixed Foiling Catamaran event, the equipment will be the Nacra 17
- For the Men's Skiff event, the equipment will be the 49er
- For the Women's Skiff event, the equipment will be the 49erFX
- For the Men's Windsurfer event, the equipment will be the IQFoil.
- For the Women's Windsurfer event, the equipment will be the IQFoil.
- For the Men's Kiteboarding event, the equipment will be the Formula Kite.
- For the Women's Kiteboarding event, the equipment will be the Formula Kite.

=== Events Selection Controversy ===
Events were top of the agenda again with Kiteboarding, Windsurfing, Keelboats, Match Racing and Offshore Racing all looking for inclusion in the games. Sailing took the approach of introducing a number of new mixed events to reach gender balance while still showcasing as many disciplines of the sport as possible. The two person boats of the 470 and Nacra 17 and yet to be chosen Offshore were going to be mixed. In addition and more controversially the single person Kiteboards was going to be two person mixed gender event.

However the IOC had concerns over Mixed Offshore, a format involving competition taking place over days, something not done in Olympics before in any sport. France were the leading nation for short handed offshore sailing with the Solitaire du Figaro and Vendee Globe so were keen to have the event.

When the IOC put World Sailing events up for review rather than accepting their recommendation, they choose to carry on backing their initial choice stating "The Mixed Offshore Event was democratically selected by our members and remains our first-choice event for Paris 2024; we have made this clear to the IOC and will continue to do so."

It then after direction that it was likely not to get it's choice took the unusual step of proposing alternative events should the IOC not endorse its recommendation. The IOC dropping the mixed offshore event allowed for kiteboarding to have a male and female competition rather than a combined event.

=== Event Management ===
The weather was very light and variable during the second week of the event, making race management difficult. Windsurfing and kitesurfing in particular had a significantly reduced qualification series. In addition, there was some abandonment of races both during the race, and in the case of kiteboarding, at the start.

== Overview ==
=== Qualification ===
The number of sailors competing across ten different events has been reduced from 350 to 330, with an equal distribution between men and women. Aiming for vast gender equality and diversity among the nations, the International Federation, World Sailing, has ratified several amendments to the qualifying process.

The qualification period started at the 2023 Sailing World Championships in The Hague, Netherlands, where 107 places, about forty percent of the total quota, had been awarded to the highest-ranked NOCs across ten different sailing events. Seven places will be distributed to sailors representing the highest-finishing, not previously qualified NOCs at each of the 2024 Men's ILCA 7 and Women's ILCA 6 World Championships. Each ILCA continental qualifiers will award two quota places with the exception of Asia, which will award one quota place at the 2023 Asian Games in China and two quota places at the Asian Olympic qualifier in Thailand.

The remainder of the total quota was attributed to the eligible MNAs through the 2024 Last Chance Regatta in Hyères, France (39 boats in total) and as part of the World Sailing Emerging Nations Program (two boats per gender each in windsurfing and dinghy). Four quota places (two per gender) were entitled to the NOCs competing in the men's ILCA 7 and women's ILCA 6 under the Tripartite Commission.

As the host country, France reserves one quota place in each of the ten sailing classes.

=== Classes (equipment) ===
Class	Type	Event	Gender	Sailors	Trapeze	Mainsail	Jib/Genoa	Spinnaker	Classes Intro.	Event Intro.
IQFoil	Windfoiling	Fleet	Female	1	–	+	–	–	2024	
IQFoil	Windfoiling	Fleet	Male	1	–	+	–	–	2024	
Formula Kite	Kiteboard	Fleet	Female	1	–	+	–	–	2024	
Formula Kite	Kiteboard	Fleet	Male	1	–	+	–	–	2024	
ILCA 6	Dinghy	Fleet	Female	1	–	+	–	–	2008	
ILCA 7	Dinghy	Fleet	Male	1	–	+	–	–	1996	Various
470	Dinghy	Fleet	Mixed	2	1	+	+	+	1976	2024
49er	Skiff	Fleet	Male	2	2	+	+	+	2000	Various
49erFX	Skiff	Fleet	Female	2	2	+	+	+	2016	
Nacra 17	Multihull	Fleet	Mixed	2	2	+	+	+	2016	

== Participating NOCs ==
In total, 65 NOCs except Individual Neutral Athletes (AIN), participated at the sport of sailing.

- Algeria (1)
- Angola (3)
- Antigua and Barbuda (1)
- Argentina (7)
- Aruba (2)
- Australia (12)
- Austria (9)
- Belgium (8)
- Bermuda (1)
- Brazil (12)
- British Virgin Islands (1)
- Canada (6)
- Cayman Islands (1)
- Chile (2)
- China (13)
- Colombia (1)
- Croatia (6)
- Cyprus (4)
- Czech Republic (3)
- Denmark (9)
- Egypt (2)
- El Salvador (1)
- Estonia (2)
- Fiji (2)
- Finland (4)
- France (14) host
- Germany (14)
- Great Britain (14)
- Greece (4)
- Guatemala (1)
- Hong Kong (5)
- Hungary (2)
- India (2)
- Ireland (4)
- Israel (8)
- Italy (12)
- Japan (7)
- Kuwait (1)
- Lithuania (2)
- Malaysia (2)
- Mauritius (2)
- Mexico (2)
- Montenegro (1)
- Mozambique (1)
- Netherlands (11)
- New Zealand (12)
- Norway (5)
- Peru (3)
- Poland (10)
- Portugal (4)
- Puerto Rico (1)
- Romania (1)
- Saint Lucia (1)
- Samoa (2)
- Singapore (2)
- Slovakia (1)
- Slovenia (6)
- South Korea (1)
- Spain (13)
- Sweden (8)
- Switzerland (7)
- Thailand (4)
- Turkey (8)
- United States (13)
- Uruguay (3)

== Competition schedule ==
=== Planned Schedule ===
Legend
S	Series races	MR	Medal race (top 10 double scoring)

Schedule
Event	Day 2	Day 3,4,5,6,7,8,9							Day 10,11,12,13,14				
Event	Sun 28	Mon 29	Tue 30	Wed 31	Thu 1	Fri 2	Sat 3	Sun 4	Mon 5	Tue 6	Wed 7	Thu 8	Fri 9
Men's classes
IQFoil	S1,2	S3,4,5,6	S7,8,9,10	S11,12,13,14	S15,16,17,18	QF, SF, F	Res.						
Formula Kite								S1,2,3,4	S5,6,7,8	S9.10,11,12	S13,14,15,16	SF, F	Res.
ILCA 7					S1,2	S3,4	S5,6	S7,8	S9,10	MR	Res.	Res.	
49er	S1,2,3	S4,5,6	S7,8,9	S10,11,12	MR	Res.							
Women's classes
IQFoil	S1,2	S3,4,5,6	S7,8,9,10	S11,12,13,14	S15,16,17,18	QF, SF, F	Res.						
Formula Kite								S1,2,3,4	S5,6,7,8	S9.10,11,12	S13,14,15,16	SF, F	Res.
ILCA 6					S1,2	S3,4	S5,6	S7,8	S9,10	MR	Res.	Res.	
49er FX	S1,2,3	S4,5,6	S7,8,9	S10,11,12	MR	Res.							
Mixed classes
470						S1,2	S3,4	S5,6	S7,8	S9.10	MR	Res.	Res.
Nacra 17							S1,2,3	S4,5,6	S7,8,9	S10,11,12	MR	Res.	Res.

=== Actual Schedule ===
Schedule
Event	Day 2	Day 3,4,5,6,7,8,9							Day 10,11,12,13,14				
Event	Sun 28	Mon 29	Tue 30	Wed 31	Thu 1	Fri 2	Sat 3	Sun 4	Mon 5	Tue 6	Wed 7	Thu 8	Fri 9
Men's classes
IQFoil		S1	S2,3,4,5,6	S7,8,9,10	S11,12,13		QF, SF, F						
Formula Kite								S1,2,3,4	S5	S6,7		SA, SB, SC, F1	F2, F3
ILCA 7					S1,2	S3,4	S5,6	S7,8			MR		
49er	S1,2,3	S4,5,6	S7,8,9	S10,11,12		MR							
Women's classes
IQFoil		S1,2	S3,4,5,6,7	S8,9,10,11	S12,13,14	QF, SF, F							
Formula Kite								S1,2,3,4	S5,6			SA, SB, F1, F2	
ILCA 6					S1	S2,3	S4,5,6	S7,8	S9		MR		
49erFX	S1,2,3	S4,5,6	S7,8,9	S10,11,12		MR							
Mixed classes
470					S1,2	S3	S4	S5,6		S7,8		MR	
Nacra 17							S1,2,3	S4,5,6	S7,8,9	S10,11,12		MR	

== Medal summary ==
A total of 30 medals were won by 19 NOC's.

=== Medal table ===
* Host nation (France)

Rank	NOC	Gold	Silver	Bronze	Total
1	Netherlands	2	0	2	4
2	Austria	2	0	0	2
2	Italy	2	0	0	2
4	Australia	1	1	0	2
4	Israel	1	1	0	2
6	Great Britain	1	0	1	2
7	Spain	1	0	0	1
8	France*	0	1	1	2
8	New Zealand	0	1	1	2
8	Sweden	0	1	1	2
11	Argentina	0	1	0	1
11	Cyprus	0	1	0	1
11	Denmark	0	1	0	1
11	Japan	0	1	0	1
11	Slovenia	0	1	0	1
16	Norway	0	0	1	1
16	Peru	0	0	1	1
16	Singapore	0	0	1	1
16	United States	0	0	1	1
Totals (19 entries)		10	10	10	30

=== Men's events ===
Event	Gold	Silver	Bronze
iQFoil	Tom Reuveny; Israel	Grae Morris; Australia	Luuc van Opzeeland; Netherlands
Formula Kite	Valentin Bontus; Austria	Toni Vodišek; Slovenia	Maximilian Maeder; Singapore
Laser	Matthew Wearn; Australia	Pavlos Kontides; Cyprus	Stefano Peschiera; Peru
49er	Spain; Diego Botín; Florián Trittel	New Zealand; Isaac McHardie; William McKenzie	United States; Ian Barrows; Hans Henken

=== Women's events ===
Event	Gold	Silver	Bronze
iQFoil	Marta Maggetti; Italy	Sharon Kantor; Israel	Emma Wilson; Great Britain
Formula Kite	Ellie Aldridge; Great Britain	Lauriane Nolot; France	Annelous Lammerts; Netherlands
Laser radial	Marit Bouwmeester; Netherlands	Anne-Marie Rindom; Denmark	Line Flem Høst; Norway
49erFX	Netherlands; Odile van Aanholt; Annette Duetz	Sweden; Vilma Bobeck; Rebecca Netzler	France; Sarah Steyaert; Charline Picon

=== Mixed events ===
Event	Gold	Silver	Bronze
470	Austria; Lara Vadlau; Lukas Mähr	Japan; Keiju Okada; Miho Yoshioka	Sweden; Anton Dahlberg; Lovisa Karlsson
Nacra 17	Italy; Ruggero Tita; Caterina Banti	Argentina; Mateo Majdalani; Eugenia Bosco	New Zealand; Micah Wilkinson; Erica Dawson

== See also ==
- Sailing at the 2022 Asian Games
- Sailing at the 2023 Pan American Games
