= Julia Damasiewicz =

Polish kitesurfer

- Born: 22 October 2004 (age 22)
- Known for: European champion kitesurfer

Julia Damasiewicz (born 22 October 2004) is a Polish formula kitesurfer. She was the European champion in 2020.

== Life ==
Damasiewicz was born in 2004.

When she was sixteen she became the European Champion in 2020 in formula kite racing. The race was in at Puck in Poland and she drew ahead of the British kitesurfer Ellie Aldridge in the final race. The winners wore COVID-19 facemasks on the Polish podium. In the following year Damasiewicz was the under-19 champion of the world.

Damasiewicz was first supported by Ozone Kites. She was the runner-up in the 2021 Youth Sailing World Championships at Mussanah in Oman. The champion was Gal Zukerman of Israel and because of political differences it was reported that nobody's national anthem was played and the results were not published for a few days.

In 2022 she won the KiteFoil World Series at Traunsee in Austria. Ellie Aldridge took the silver medal and the American Daniela Moroz was third. It was a three-day competition but lack of wind meant that nearly all but one of the races took place on the final afternoon in light thermal winds on a freshwater lake in thirty degree temperatures. In the same year she went to The Hague in the Netherlands to compete in the World Youth Games. She won the event beating the French kitesurfer Héloïse Pégourié and the Turkish kitefoiler Derin Atakan who came third.

In November 2023 Damasiewicz was in Shenzhen in China taking part in the Formula Kite Asia & Oceania Championships. She took third place overall and she was the highest placed surfer who was under 21 years old. The championship was won by Jingyue Chen and Chen's fellow Chinese kitesurfer, Wan Li, took silver.

The last five of the 20 places for women kitefoilers at the Olympics were awarded at the Last Chance Regatta in April 2024 to the Austrian Surfer Alina Kornelli, the Swiss surfer Elena Lengwiler, the Turkish Derin Atakan, Mafalda Pires de Lima of Portugal and Damasiewicz.

In 2024 she finished seventh at the Formula Kite Worlds at Hyères in France. She was the highest placed woman under 21 at the event.
