= Eduardo Marques (sailor) =

Portuguese sailor

Personal information
- Nationality: Portugal
- Born: 15 January 1994 (age 32) Lisbon, Portugal

Sailing career
- Sport: Sailing
- Class: ILCA 7

Eduardo Marques (born 15 January, 1994) is a Portuguese sailor who competed at the 2024 Summer Olympics in the ILCA 7, where he placed 11th.
