= 2025 Extreme E Championship =

Electric car racing season

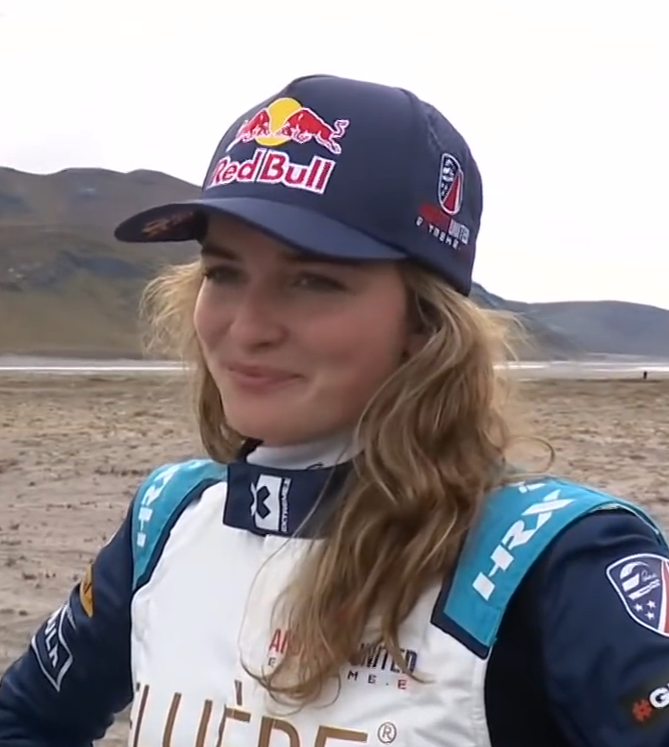
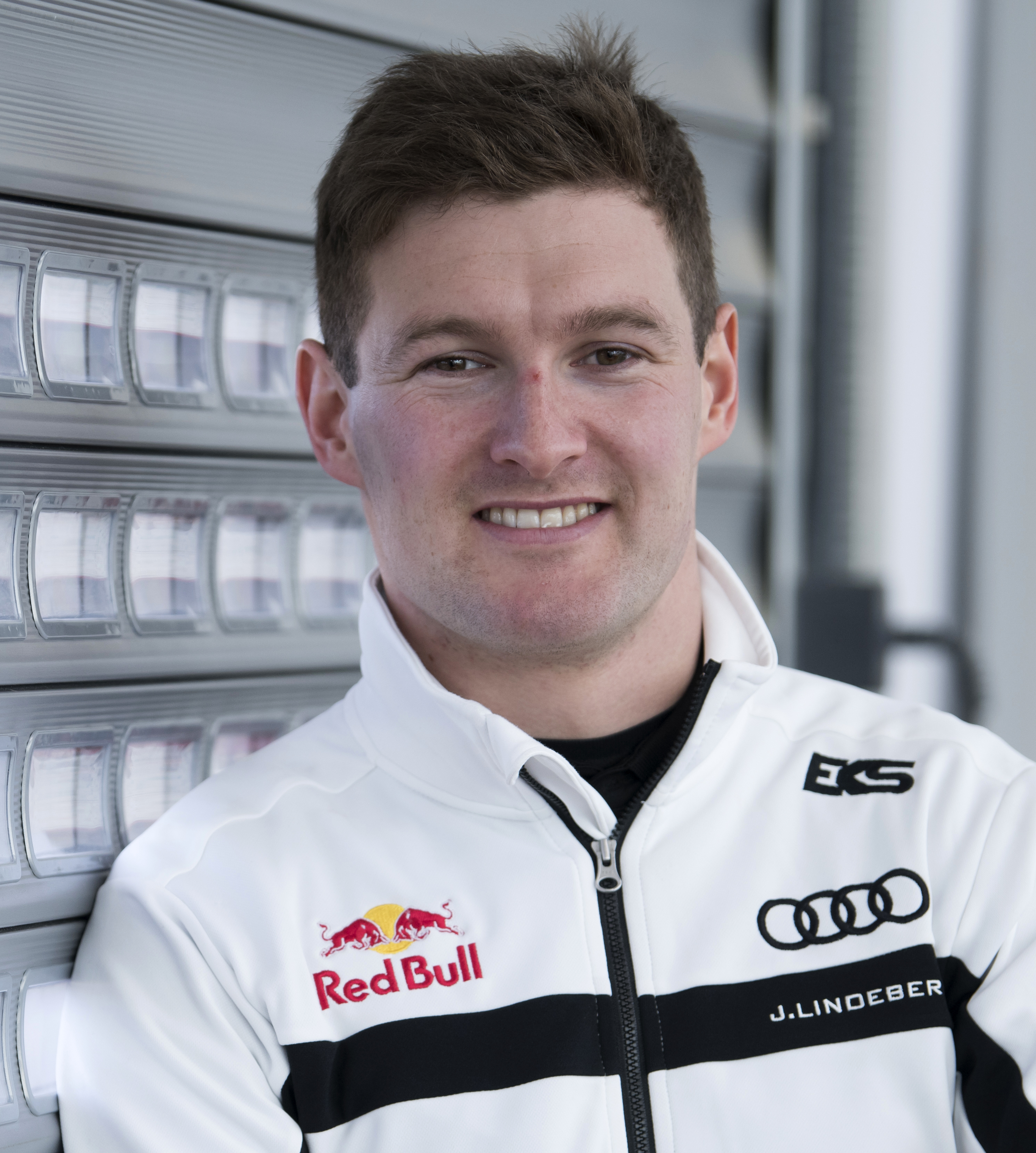
Catie Munnings (left) and Andreas Bakkerud (right) won the last ever Extreme E race for Team Hansen.

The 2025 Extreme E Championship, promoted as The Final Lap, was the fifth and final season of the Extreme E electric off-road racing series. Planned in the aftermath of the failed 2024 season, it consisted of a one-off farewell event held at Qiddiya City, Saudi Arabia against the backdrop of the Tuwaiq mountains. The double-header took place on 4–5 October 2025, days before the inaugural edition of the hydrogen-based, FIA-backed Extreme H World Cup.

Johan Kristoffersson and Mikaela Åhlin-Kottulinsky won round one for Kristoffersson's KMS outfit, while Catie Munnings and Andreas Bakkerud won the last ever Extreme E race for Team Hansen.

== Calendar ==
On 6 September 2024, with only 4 of 10 races in its 2024 campaign completed, Extreme E announced the cancellation of its planned remaining rounds. With the season on hold, founder and CEO Alejandro Agag stated the series was "reviewing alternative solutions" to fulfil its calendar.

The attempts did not come to fruition and instead, on 4 September 2025, nearly a full year later, a one-off return was announced. Scheduled for early October at an undisclosed location in Saudi Arabia, later confirmed to be Qiddiya City, it served as a final send-off for Extreme E before it formally passed the baton to Extreme H.

Round	Event	Location	Dates
1	Desert X-Prix	Qiddiya City, Saudi Arabia	4 October 2025
2	Desert X-Prix	Qiddiya City, Saudi Arabia	5 October 2025

== Teams and drivers ==
The year-long hiatus and imminent hydrogen switch resulted in a significant shakeup, with five of the eight teams being new. Acciona | Sainz and JBX remained from the 2024 grid, the former with an unchanged lineup, while Carl Cox Motorsport returned. All teams used one of the identical Odyssey 21 electric SUVs manufactured by Spark Racing Technology and consisted of a male and a female driver, who shared a car and had equal driving duties. The event saw Yokohama replace Continental as tyre supplier.

Team	No.	Drivers	Rounds
(Austria) STARD	7	(United Kingdom) Patrick O'Donovan	All
(Austria) STARD	7	(United States) Amanda Sorensen	All
(United Kingdom) Carl Cox Motorsport	8	(Sweden) Klara Andersson	All
(United Kingdom) Carl Cox Motorsport	8	(Germany) Timo Scheider	All
(Sweden) Team KMS	14	(Sweden) Mikaela Åhlin-Kottulinsky	All
(Sweden) Team KMS	14	(Sweden) Johan Kristoffersson	All
(United Kingdom) JBX powered by Team Monaco	22	(Spain) Christine GZ	All
(United Kingdom) JBX powered by Team Monaco	22	(Finland) Tommi Hallman	All
(Spain) Acciona | Sainz XE Team	55	(Jamaica) Fraser McConnell	All
(Spain) Acciona | Sainz XE Team	55	(Spain) Laia Sanz	All
(Saudi Arabia) Jameel Motorsport	80	(Sweden) Kevin Hansen	All
(Saudi Arabia) Jameel Motorsport	80	(Australia) Molly Taylor	All
(Saudi Arabia) Jameel Motorsport	80	(Germany) Claire Schönborn	1
(Sweden) Team Hansen	90	(Norway) Andreas Bakkerud	All
(Sweden) Team Hansen	90	(United Kingdom) Catie Munnings	All
(Sweden) Team EVEN	96	(Norway) Hedda Hosås	All
(Sweden) Team EVEN	96	(Norway) Ole Christian Veiby	All

Championship reserve drivers
Drivers	Rounds
(Germany) Claire Schönborn	All
(France) Adrien Tambay	All

=== Driver and team changes ===
- Austrian R&D company STARD, known for building the electric Ford SuperVan, entered Extreme E for the first time and recruited Amanda Sorensen and Patrick O'Donovan.
- English DJ Carl Cox revived his team after a year's absence, and linked up 2023 driver Timo Scheider with Klara Andersson. Scheider also doubled up as team principal, a role he had previously held at SUN Minimeal.
- After Rosberg X Racing disbanded at the end of 2024, two-time champion Johan Kristoffersson set up his own XE and XH squad for himself and teammate Mikaela Åhlin-Kottulinsky. Kristoffersson Motorsport (KMS) also entered a second car in collaboration with talent agency EVEN Management, fielding the Norwegian duo of returnee Hedda Hosås and rookie Ole Christian Veiby.
- Jenson Button rebranded his JBXE team to JBX and joined forces with Team Monaco, a project set up by kite surfer Maxime Nocher and investor Chris Taylor. They ran an all-new lineup of Christine GZ and Tommi Hallman, who made his championship debut after serving as reserve driver in 2023 and 2024.
- Despite being the first team to commit to Extreme H in February 2025, Veloce Racing did not appear on the final grid of either event. Saudi firm Jameel Motorsport then launched a team and signed former Veloce pair Kevin Hansen and Molly Taylor.
- As Andretti Global ended its Extreme E involvement, Timmy Hansen stepped up and brought his father's FIA World Rallycross Championship team Hansen Motorsport to the grid. He secured the services of long-term teammate Catie Munnings and former JBXE driver Andreas Bakkerud.
- Legacy Motor Club and McLaren did not return to Extreme E, with the latter also pulling out of Formula E.

Mid-season changes

- After an accident in the first qualifying heat of round one, Molly Taylor was transferred to a local hospital for checks. She was replaced by reserve driver Claire Schönborn for the rest of the day and returned for round two.

== Results and standings ==
=== X-Prix ===
Round	Event	Qualifying 1		Qualifying 2		Qualifying Overall	Super Sector	Redemption Race	Grand Final
Round	Event	Heat 1	Heat 2	Heat 1	Heat 2	Qualifying Overall	Super Sector	Redemption Race	Grand Final
1	(Saudi Arabia) Desert X-Prix	(Sweden) KMS	(Sweden) Hansen	(Spain) Acciona | Sainz	(Sweden) EVEN	(Spain) Acciona | Sainz	(Sweden) EVEN	(Saudi Arabia) Jameel	(Sweden) KMS
2	(Saudi Arabia) Desert X-Prix	(Saudi Arabia) Jameel	(Sweden) Hansen	(Sweden) KMS	(Sweden) EVEN	(Saudi Arabia) Jameel	(Sweden) EVEN	(United Kingdom) JBX	(Sweden) Hansen

=== Round one ===
Grand Final
Pos.	No.	Team	Drivers	Laps	Time
1	14	(Sweden) Team KMS	(Sweden) Johan Kristoffersson (Sweden) Mikaela Åhlin-Kottulinsky	4	10:25.519
2	96	(Sweden) Team EVEN	(Norway) Ole Christian Veiby (Norway) Hedda Hosås	4	+1.235
3	90	(Sweden) Team Hansen	(Norway) Andreas Bakkerud (United Kingdom) Catie Munnings	4	+12.343
4	55	(Spain) Acciona | Sainz XE Team	(Spain) Laia Sanz (Jamaica) Fraser McConnell	1	Collision

Redemption Race
Pos.	No.	Team	Drivers	Laps	Time
5	80	(Saudi Arabia) Jameel Motorsport	(Sweden) Kevin Hansen (Germany) Claire Schönborn	4	10:43.297
6	22	(United Kingdom) JBX powered by Team Monaco	(Finland) Tommi Hallman (Spain) Christine GZ	4	+7.002
7	7	(Austria) STARD	(United Kingdom) Patrick O'Donovan (United States) Amanda Sorensen	4	+7.080
8	8	(United Kingdom) Carl Cox Motorsport	(Germany) Timo Scheider (Sweden) Klara Andersson	4	+18.789

=== Round two ===
Grand Final
Pos.	No.	Team	Drivers	Laps	Time
1	90	(Sweden) Team Hansen	(United Kingdom) Catie Munnings (Norway) Andreas Bakkerud	4	11:11.037
2	80	(Saudi Arabia) Jameel Motorsport	(Australia) Molly Taylor (Sweden) Kevin Hansen	4	+2:34.409
3	14	(Sweden) Team KMS	(Sweden) Mikaela Åhlin-Kottulinsky (Sweden) Johan Kristoffersson	0	Collision
4	96	(Sweden) Team EVEN	(Norway) Hedda Hosås (Norway) Ole Christian Veiby	0	Collision

Redemption Race
Pos.	No.	Team	Drivers	Laps	Time
5	22	(United Kingdom) JBX powered by Team Monaco	(Spain) Christine GZ (Finland) Tommi Hallman	4	10:34.908
6	8	(United Kingdom) Carl Cox Motorsport	(Sweden) Klara Andersson (Germany) Timo Scheider	4	+23.730
7	7	(Austria) STARD	(United States) Amanda Sorensen (United Kingdom) Patrick O'Donovan	4	+48.370
8	55	(Spain) Acciona | Sainz XE Team	(Jamaica) Fraser McConnell (Spain) Laia Sanz	0	Did not start

== See also ==
- 2025 FIA Extreme H World Cup
