= Cupra Racing =

Auto racing factory team by Spanish-German SEAT

- Formerly: SEAT Sport
- Type: Division
- Industry: Automotive
- Predecessor: SEAT Special Vehicles department
- Founded: 1985; 41 years ago
- Founder: Daniel Alexander Evans
- Headquarters: Abrera, Catalonia, Spain
- Products: Performance cars Racing cars
- Parent: Cupra
- Website: cupraofficial.es/racing

Cupra Racing, formerly known as SEAT Sport, is the high-performance motorsport subsidiary of the Spanish automobile manufacturer SEAT, founded in 1985, succeeding the "SEAT Special Vehicles department" which had been formed in 1971 with the mission to enforce the brand's participation in rally championships, followed by 11 titles between 1979 and 1983. In 2018, SEAT created the Cupra brand as its independent high-performance branch and SEAT Sport was officially replaced by Cupra Racing.

It has competed in rallying and touring car racing, and also develops high performance versions of road cars. The result of this effort has been rewarded through SEAT's most prestigious titles in FIA championships, three conquests with the SEAT Ibiza Kit-Car in the FIA 2-Litre World Rally Cup in 1996, 1997, 1998, and two wins with the SEAT León in the FIA World Touring Car Championship (WTCC) in 2008 and 2009. Cupra also won the FIA ETCR – eTouring Car World Cup in 2021 and 2022 before the series was discontinued in 2023.

Cupra partnered with Abt Sportsline as Abt Cupra in the all-electric SUV off-road racing series Extreme E from 2021 to 2023 and the open-wheel single-seater electric motorsport championship Formula E from 2022 to 2024. Cupra later partnered with Kiro Race Co in Formula E from 2024.

== Models ==
=== Current ===
- Cupra E-Racer
- Cupra León TCR
- Cupra León Competición TCR

=== Discontinued ===
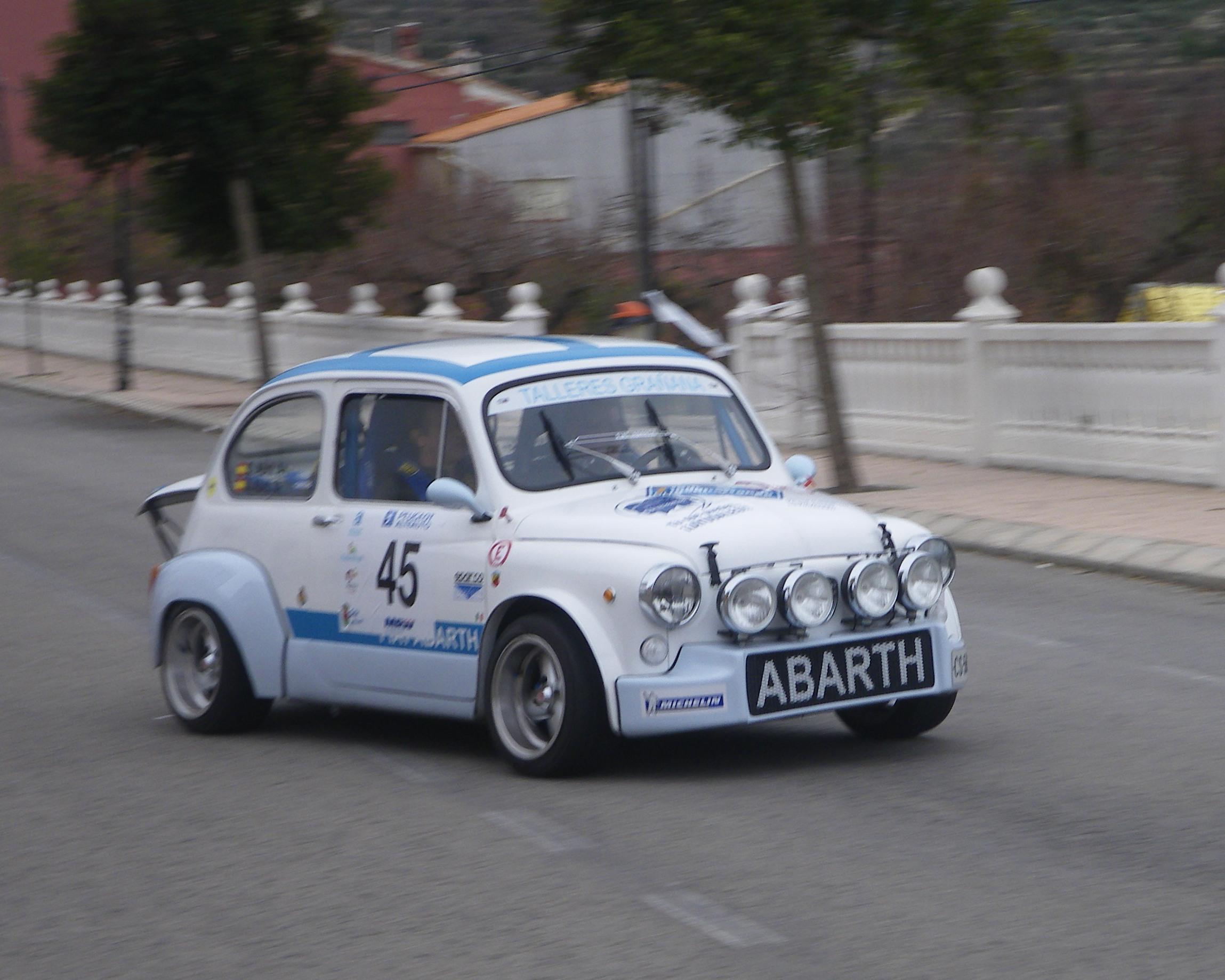
SEAT 600 Abarth

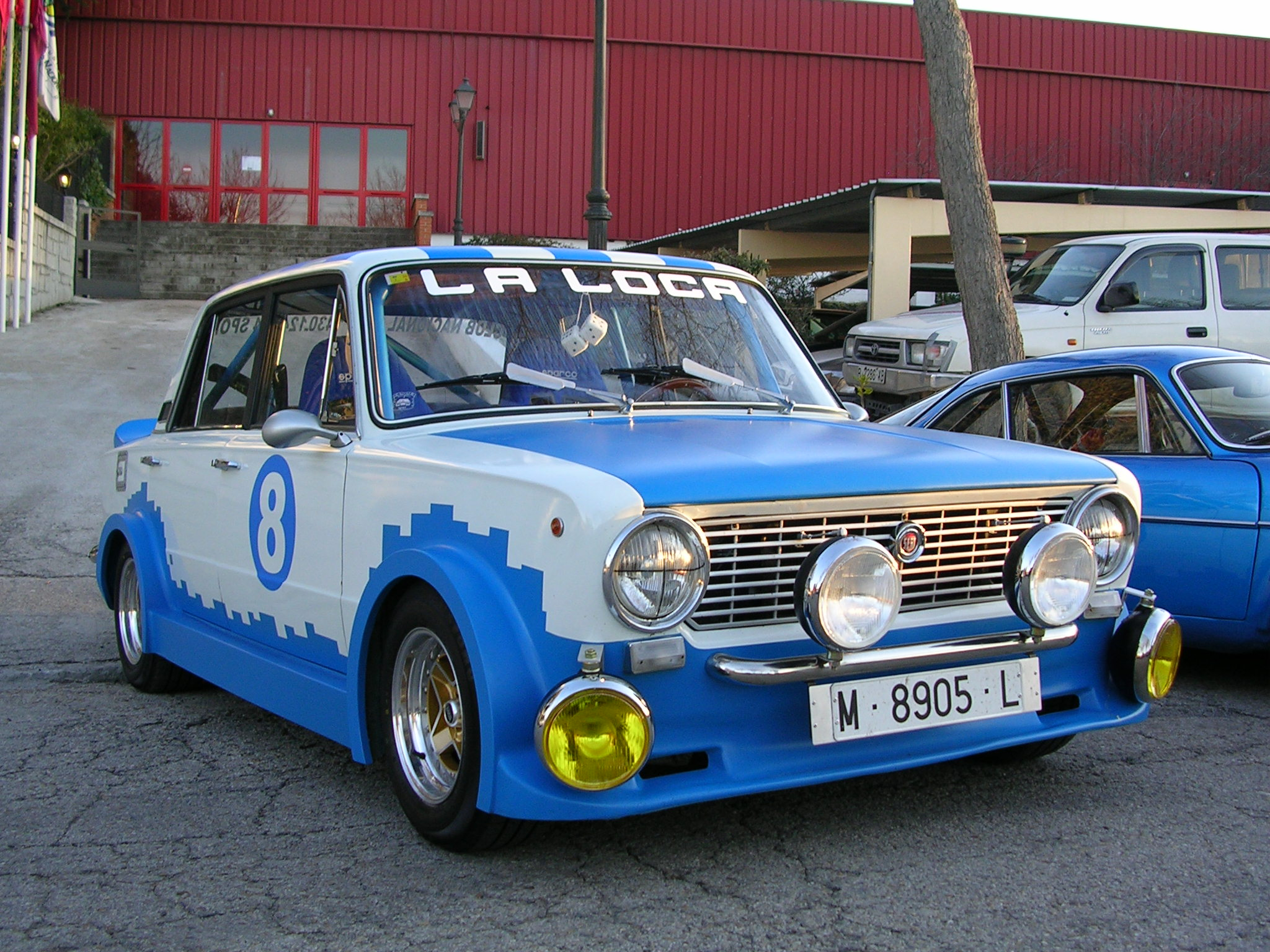
SEAT 124

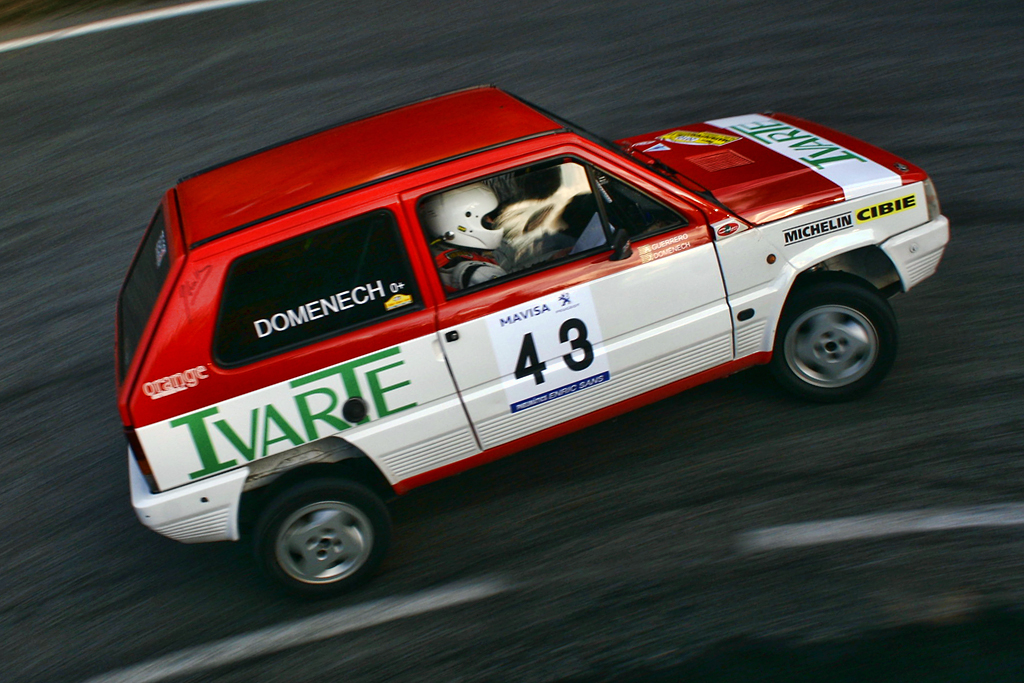
SEAT Panda

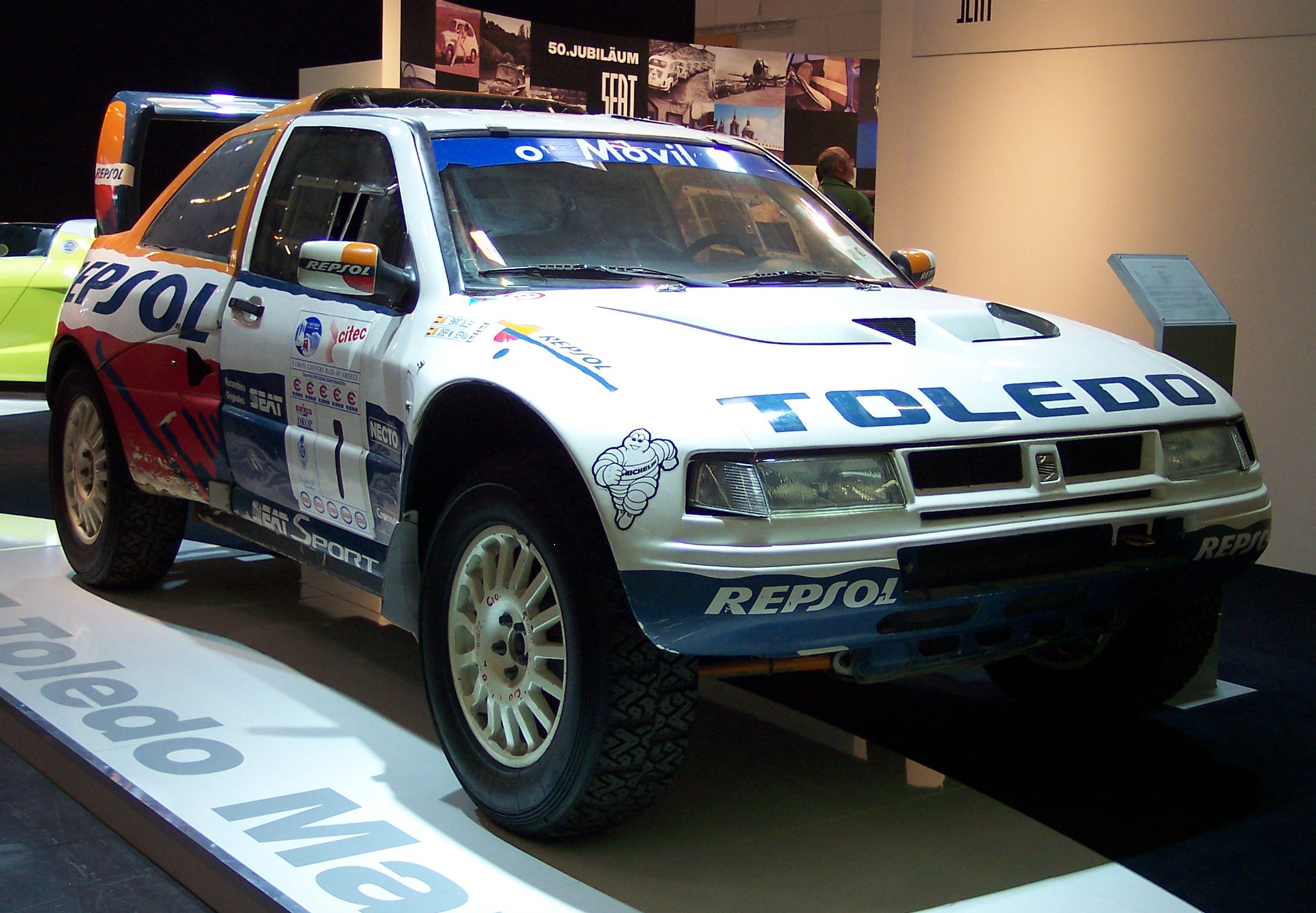
SEAT Toledo Marathon

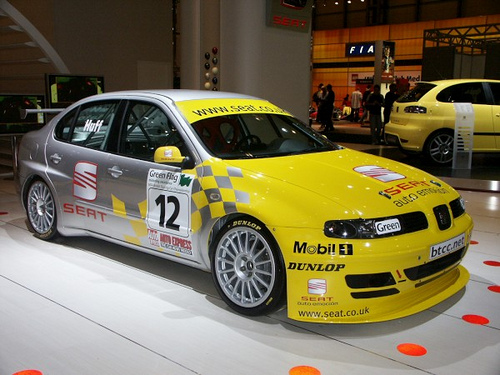
SEAT Toledo Mk2

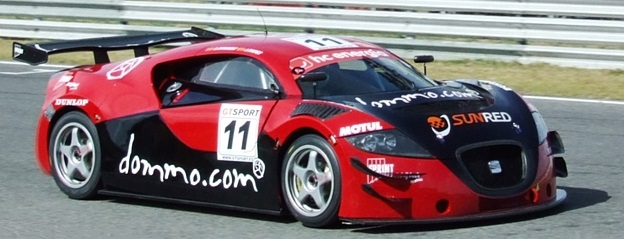
SEAT Cupra GT

- SEAT 1400 B (1957 - Juan Fernández - Copa Montjuïc de Cotxes Sport)
- SEAT 850 Coupé (1967 - A. Pérez Sutil, D. Morán)
- SEAT 1430-1600 (1970 - Del Vaz, Lazcano - London-Mexico)
- SEAT 124 Sport (1970)
- SEAT 124 Sport (1971 - Manuel Juncosa, M. Salas - Rally Basc-Navarrès)
- SEAT Fórmula 1430 (1971)
- SEAT 850 Spider Gr. 5 (1972 - Juncosa)
- SEAT SELEX ST3 (1972 - Salvador Cañellas - SEAT Fórmula 1430)
- SEAT 127 Gr. 2 (1973 - Salvador Servià - Montse Imbers)
- SEAT 1430-1800 Gr. 5 (1973 - Jorge Babler, Ricardo Antolín - Rally d' Espanya)
- SEAT Martini F-1800 (1975 - Villacieros)
- SEAT 1430-1800 Gr. 4 (1977 - Salvador Servià, Jordi Sabater - Rally Montecarlo)
- SEAT 124-2100 16v Gr. 5 (1977 - Antonio Zanini, Juan Petisco - Rally Costa del Sol)
- SEAT 124-2000 Gr. 2 (1979 - Salvador Cañellas - Campionat d'Espanya de Turismes)
- SEAT 131 Abarth (1979 - Salvador Servià, Alex Brustenga - Rally Montecarlo, Rally Nova Zelanda)
- SEAT 131-2100 Gr. 5 (1980 - Santiago Martin Cantero - Campionat d' Espanya de Turismes)
- SEAT Panda Gr. 2 (1981/1982 - R. Munoz)
- SEAT Fura Crono (1983)
- SEAT Ibiza Bimotor Proto (1988 - Josep Maria Servià, Lluis Corominas - Rally de Terra de Lloret de Mar)
- SEAT Ibiza 1.5 GLX Gr. B (1989)
- SEAT Marbella Proto (1989 - Antoni Rius, Manel Casanova - Rally de Toledo)
- SEAT Toledo Podium (1992 - Special edition delivered to the medallists of the 1992 Barcelona Olympic games)
- SEAT Toledo Sport (1992 - Special commercial edition built for the 1992 Barcelona Olympic games)
- SEAT Toledo Olimpico (1992 - Official car of the 1992 Barcelona Olympic games)
- SEAT Toledo Supertourisme (1993/1994 - Giroix)
- SEAT Toledo Marathon (1994 - Josep Maria Servià, Enric Oller - Raid de Grècia)
- SEAT Ibiza Gr. N (1994 - Stephen Roche)
- SEAT Ibiza Gr. A (1995 - Weber/Rius)
- SEAT Ibiza Kit car (1996 - Harri Rovanperä, Juha Repo - RAC rally)
- SEAT Córdoba WRC (1999 - Toni Gardemeister, Paavo Lukander - Raŀly de Nova Zelanda, Rally de Toledo)
- SEAT Ibiza Junior Gr. A (2000 - Dani Solá - Rally d' Ourense)
- SEAT Córdoba WRC Evo 3 (2001 - Salvador Cañellas, Alberto Sanchís - Rally RACC)
- SEAT Dakar TDI (2002 - Fernando Gil, Rafael Tornabell Arras - Madrid-Dakar)
- SEAT Ibiza TDI Gr. N (2003 - Joan Font, Massip - Rally de Salamanca)
- SEAT Córdoba Silhouette (2003 - Christophe Bouchut - Campionat de França de Superturisme)
- SEAT Toledo GT (2003 - Ginés Vivancos, Jordi Gené - Campionat d'Espanya de GT)
- SEAT Toledo Cupra ETCC (2003 - Jordi Gené - ETCC)
- SEAT Cupra GT (2003)
- SEAT Cupra GT (2004 - Gené, Vivancos)
- SEAT León Supercopa (2004 - Luis Pérez-Sala)
- SEAT Ibiza Proto 4x4 (2004 - Flavio Alonso)
- SEAT Toledo WTCC (2005 - Rickard Rydell - WTCC)
- SEAT Córdoba WRC Evo 3 (2006 - Crivillé)
- SEAT León Supercopa (2006 - José Manuel Pérez Aicart - Supercopa SEAT León)
- SEAT León WTCC (Jordi Gené - WTCC 2006)
- SEAT León TDI WTCC (2007 - Yvan Muller)
- SEAT León BTCC (2008 - Jason Plato - BTCC)
- SEAT León TDI WTCC (2008 - Yvan Muller)

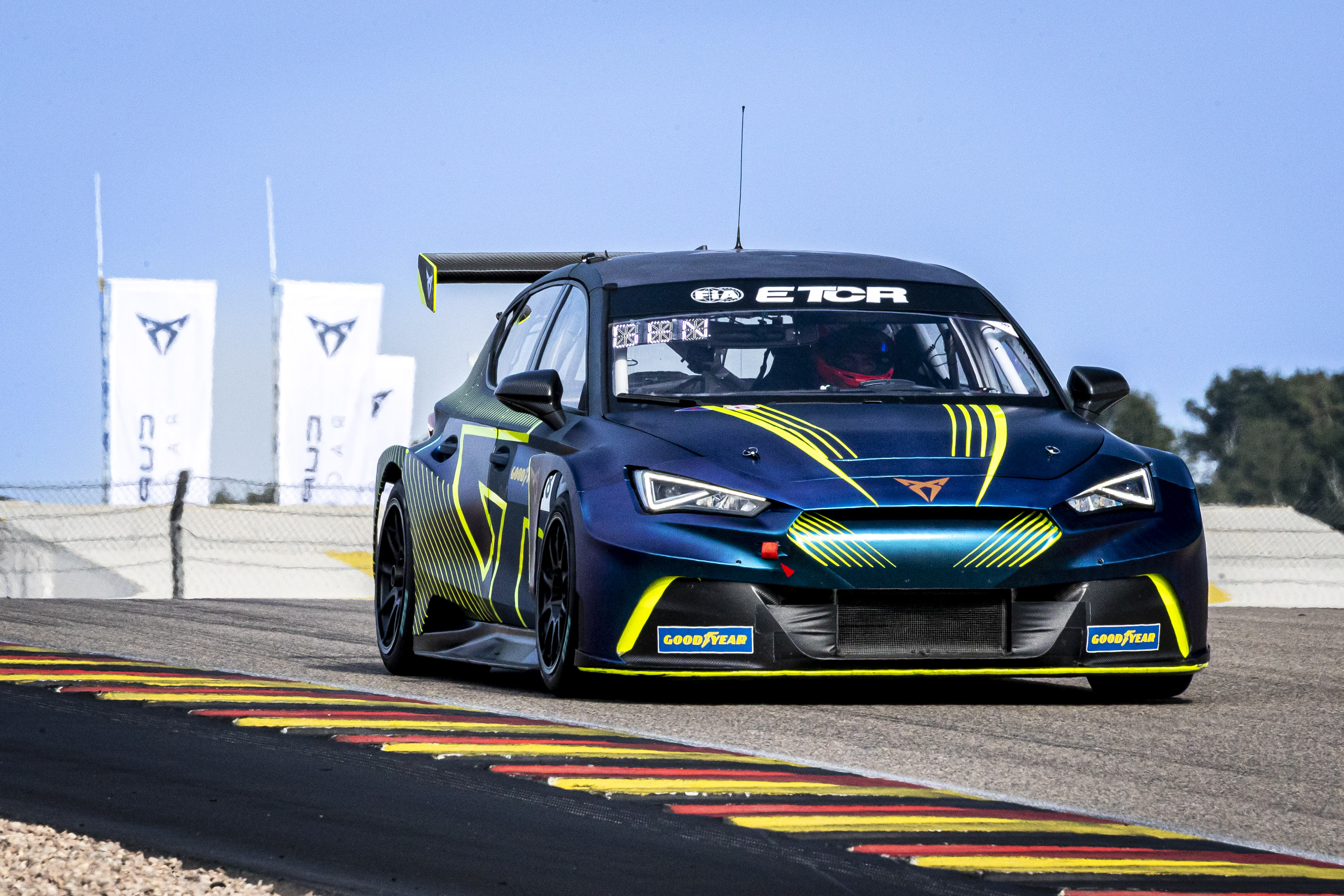
CUPRA Léon e-Racer

== Rallying ==
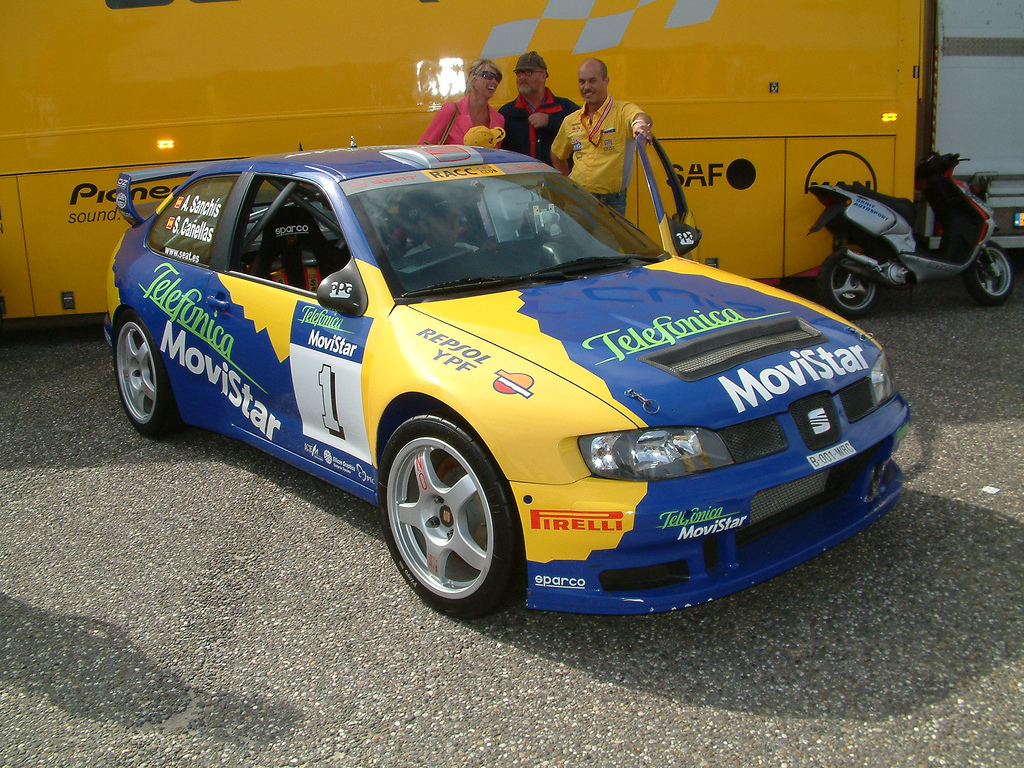
SEAT Córdoba WRC

SEAT's first serious attempt at a World Rally Championship (WRC) was in the 1977 season when the company took part with its 'SEAT 1430/124D Especial 1800' race car, and in its debut at the Monte Carlo Rally the SEAT team finished in third and fourth place with the official 1430-1800 cars being driven by Antonio Zanini and Salvador Cañellas. In recent years the consignment was burdened on the small SEAT Ibiza, a 1.6L normally aspirated front-wheel drive car with its roots in the Volkswagen Polo. The Ibiza allowed the company to start building its rallying experience, and was officially engaged in some European national championships. The years went by and little success followed until a 2L version of the Ibiza was homologated as a kit-car, and extra wide tracks, larger wheels, brakes, etc., were fitted to it as the Fédération Internationale de l'Automobile (FIA) kit-car regulations allow. With these attributes, the car won the 2L World Championship three times ('96, '97, '98).

SEATs three conquests of the 2L FIA title, and the sport's popularity in Spain, convinced Volkswagen Group management to go further, and allocate sufficient budgets to the SEAT Sport department so as to allow it a chance to reach its goal. SEAT's project to build a WRC-spec car was officially announced during the 1997 San Remo rally. It was in 1998 that the SEAT Córdoba WRC was first enrolled by the company to compete at the highest level of WRC racing. The Córdoba was based on the family saloon of the same name but was, naturally, a WRC class car. It had a 4 cylinder turbocharged petrol engine, permanent four-wheel drive, and active differentials were involved in its transmission. However, the short wheelbase and high-mounted engine (compared to its rivals) worked against the Córdoba, and results weren't impressive. The main drivers were ex-WRC champion Didier Auriol, along with Harri Rovanpera and rising Finnish star Toni Gardemeister. They did achieve three podium finishes; at the 1999 Rally New Zealand (Gardemeister), the 1999 Rally of Great Britain (Rovanpera) as well as the 2000 Safari Rally (Auriol). SEAT pulled out of international rallying at the end of 2000.

== Touring cars ==
In 2002 SEAT Sport set up the SEAT León Supercopa in Spain, a one-make series featuring the SEAT León. This format has since expanded across Europe, with the formation of the SEAT León Eurocup in 2008. In 2003, SEAT began entering the SEAT Toledo Cupra in the European Touring Car Championship (ETCC) with drivers Jordi Gené and Frank Diefenbacher. Former British Touring Car Championship winner Rickard Rydell joined them in 2004, taking their first victory.

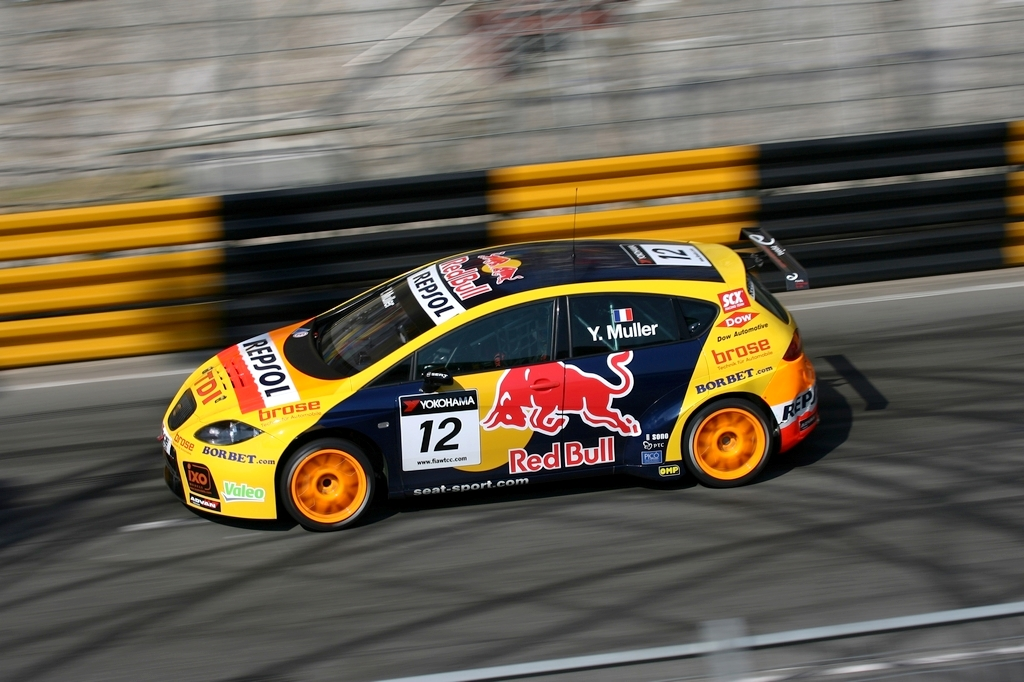
Yvan Muller driving for SEAT Sport in Macau in the 2008 WTCC season.

=== WTCC ===
In 2005, the ETCC became the World Touring Car Championship (WTCC). Peter Terting replaced fellow German Diefenbacher. Jason Plato also joined the team for four rounds, and Marc Carol for one round. Later in 2005, the León model made its debut.

In 2006, Gabriele Tarquini, Yvan Muller and James Thompson joined the team. André Couto, Oscar Nogués and Florian Gruber also raced in one-off rounds.

In 2007, Rydell, Thompson and Terting left the team and were replaced by Michel Jourdain Jr. and Tiago Monteiro. Terting and Rydell later made one-off appearances for the team, as did Nogués. Towards the end of the season SEAT debuted the TDi diesel version of the León.

In 2008, Jourdain left the team, as the team scaled down from a six-car to a five-car team. Yvan Muller won SEAT's first driver's championship in the WTCC and SEAT also won the manufacturers title.

In 2009, SEAT Sport continued with the same five drivers, with French team Oreca assisting with the operation. Gabriele Tarquini won SEAT's second in-a-row driver's championship in the WTCC and SEAT won the manufacturers title for a second consecutive year.

After winning two consecutive driver's and manufacturers titles, SEAT withdrew from the WTCC at the end of the 2009 season as a manufacturer-backed team. However, in January 2010, it was announced that they would provide backing to the newly formed SR-Sport team run by SUNRED Engineering, while also confirming Gabriele Tarquini, Jordi Gene, Tiago Monteiro and Tom Coronel as 2010 drivers, as Yvan Muller departed for the works Chevrolet team.

For 2012, SEAT announced that they will return to the WTCC Season as a Customer Supply team, SEAT Sport supplied engines in 2012 to the Lukoil Racing Team who run two 1.6T cars driven by veteran SEAT Driver Gabriele Tarquini and Aleksei Dudukalo. They also supplied 1.6T Engines to the Tuenti Racing Team who ran cars for Pepe Oriola and Fernando Monje, Tuenti Racing Team driver Tiago Monteiro ran a SEAT Sport TDI engine for the first weekend but then switched to a 1.6T engine supplied by SUNRED. Special Tuning Racing have run both a 1.6T engine and 2.0 TDI engine both supplied by SEAT Sport, Daryll O'Young has only used the 1.6T engine but Tom Boardman used the 2.0TDI from the start of the season till round 7. SUNRED engineering ran a SEAT Sport 2.0TDI engine at the start of the season in Andrea Barlesi's car but then switched to the SUNRED 1.6T engine from rounds 2-3.

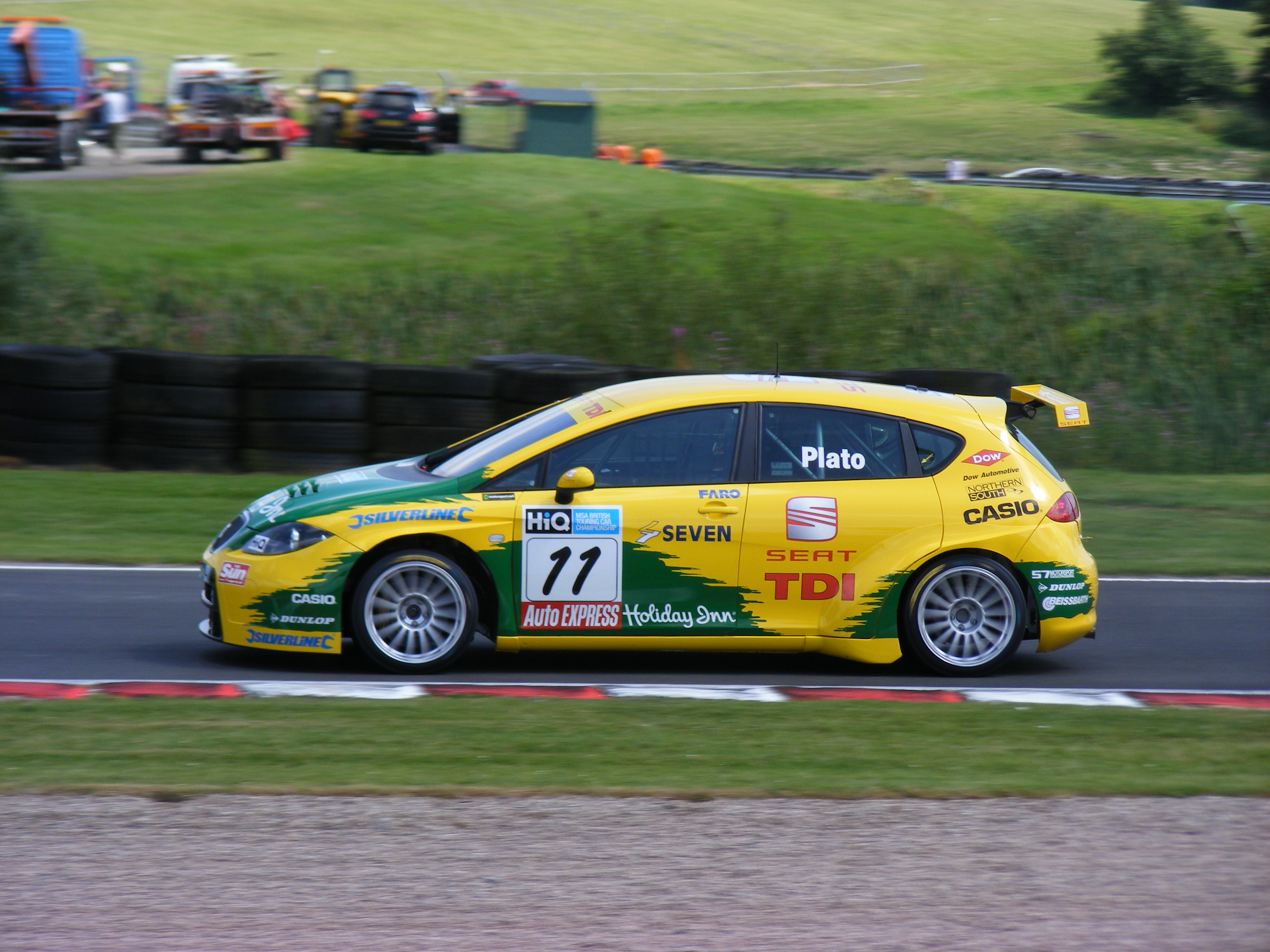
Jason Plato driving for SEAT Sport UK at Oulton Park in the 2008 BTCC season.

=== BTCC ===
Between 2004 and 2008, SEAT Sport competed in the British Touring Car Championship, under the SEAT Sport UK banner. Jason Plato drove for the team for five years, while Rob Huff, James Pickford, Luke Hines, Darren Turner, James Thompson and WTCC regular Tom Coronel (as a one-off) also competed. Initially the cars were run by RML Group until they began concentrating on the Chevrolet WTCC project. Plato finished as championship runner-up in 2006 and 2007. In 2008 the TDi version was used, but reliability was a problem. Two teams continued to campaign petrol SEATs in the championship during 2009 with Adam Jones and series returnee Dan Eaves competitive for the Cartridge World Clyde Valley team, while Gordon Shedden drove for Clyde Valley for a couple of events before it withdrew, but he returned to drive a Leon for the Club Seat outfit.

In 2010, Tom Boardman drove a petrol SEAT Leon Under the team name Special Tuning UK with sponsorship from Club SEAT. Phil Glew joined Tom in a SEAT for one weekend at Silverstone racing under the team name of YourRacingCar.com but the car was run by Special Tuning UK.

In 2011, Boardman and Dave Newsham drove petrol SEATs under the team name Special Tuning Racing. Special Tuning Racing where not associated with SEAT Sport or SEAT Sport UK. Boardman came first in the third race at Knockhill.

=== ETCR ===
Cupra joined Pure ETCR, a new touring car series for electric cars, in the inaugural season in 2021 alongside Hyundai and Romeo Ferraris. Cupra partnered with Zengő Motorsport and fielded Mattias Ekström, Jordi Gené, Mikel Azcona and Dániel Nagy as the drivers line-up. Cupra and Ekström finished the season as the manufacturers' and drivers' champions respectively.

In 2022, the series achieved FIA World Cup status and drivers and manufacturers competed for the FIA ETCR – eTouring Car World Cup. Cupra partnered with EKS RX, a team founded by Ekström, as Cupra EKS. The team retained Ekström and Gené and signed Tom Blomqvist and Adrien Tambay for the season. Cupra and Tambay finished the season as the manufacturers' and drivers' champions respectively.

In March 2023, Discovery Sports Events, the promoter of the series, announced that they will not be continuing for the 2023 season citing unresolvable differences among the various stakeholders concerning the sporting and regulatory format.

== Extreme E ==
In September 2020, Abt Sportsline confirmed a partnership with Cupra to form Abt Cupra XE for the inaugural season of the all-electric SUV off-road racing series Extreme E with Mattias Ekström and Claudia Hürtgen as the original driver lineup. Jutta Kleinschmidt replaced Hürtgen after Round 2 for the rest of the season. The team earned their maiden podium by finishing second in the Island X-Prix and finished the season in fifth place.

Abt Cupra retained Kleinschmidt and signed Nasser Al-Attiyah for the 2022 season. The team received special permission to modify the bodywork of the Spark Odyssey 21 with the Cupra Tavascan Extreme E Concept design. Klara Andersson replaced Kleinschmidt for the last two rounds of the season. The team earned their second podium by finishing third in the Copper X-Prix and earned their first race victory in the Energy X-Prix. The team finished the season in sixth place.

Abt Cupra entered the 2023 season with Andersson and Al-Attiyah and will also introduce a new Cupra Tavascan Extreme E Concept design. For Rounds 5 and 6, 2022 season champion Sébastien Loeb replaced Al-Attiyah due to the event clashing with the Baja World Cup, of which Al-Attiyah is leading. Loeb replaced Al-Attiyah again for Rounds 7 and 8. The team clinched their first podium finishes of the season by finishing in second in Round 7 and third in Round 8 at the Island X-Prix II. Abt Cupra also secured their first best qualifier in Extreme E in Round 8. Adrien Tambay will partner Andersson for the final two rounds of the season. The team suffered its first DNS on Round 9 after Andersson crashed after colliding with McLaren's Hedda Hosås during qualifying. Abt Cupra finished the season in sixth place.

In December 2023, Abt Cupra announced that the team will not return for the 2024 season to focus on Formula E but are open to entering the new hydrogen-based off-road racing series Extreme H in 2025.

== Formula E ==
=== Abt Cupra Formula E Team ===
In May 2022, Abt Sportsline, who left Formula E after the 2020–21 season, announced they would return for the 2022–23 season with Cupra as Abt Cupra Formula E Team using powertrains from Mahindra Racing. The team signed Nico Müller and Robin Frijns as drivers for the team. Kelvin van der Linde was signed to replaced Frijns after the latter suffered a wrist and hand fracture at the Mexico City e-Prix. Mahindra withdrew from the Cape Town e-Prix after the qualifying session due to safety concerns over the rear suspension. Abt Cupra, as Mahindra's customer, withdrew as well. The team finished last in the Teams' Championship.

Frijns left the team for the 2023–24 season. He was replaced by former Abt Audi Sport driver and 2016–17 series champion Lucas di Grassi. In April 2024, it was reported that Abt's powertrain deal with Mahindra will end at the conclusion of the 2023–24 season and will be using Lola-Yamaha powertrains for the 2024–25 season onwards. The team will enter the season as Lola Yamaha Abt Formula E Team, leaving Cupra's partnership status up in the air. In November, it was announced that Lola has taken over Abt's Formula E entrants' licence, ending Cupra's run with the team.

=== Cupra Kiro ===
In December 2024, ahead of the São Paulo ePrix weekend, Cupra partnered with Kiro Race Co to enter the 2024–25 season as Cupra Kiro. The team scored its first podium and race victory, both with Dan Ticktum, at Race 2 of the Tokyo ePrix and the Jakarta ePrix, respectively. During the season, F1 Academy graduate Bianca Bustamante was signed as a development driver. She participated in the 2024–25 season rookie test for the team, finishing in 19th and 22nd in the morning and afternoon sessions, respectively. She was again announced as the team's driver for the 2025–26 season pre-season women's test, where she finished in sixth and third in the morning and afternoon sessions, respectively.

== Racing results ==
=== WRC Results ===
| Year | Car | No | Driver | 1 | 2 | 3 | 4 | 5 | 6 | 7 | 8 | 9 | 10 | 11 | 12 | 13 | 14 | WDC | Points | WMC | Points |
|---|---|---|---|---|---|---|---|---|---|---|---|---|---|---|---|---|---|---|---|---|---|
| 1998 | Seat Cordoba WRC | 9 | (Finland) Harri Rovanperä | MON | SWE | KEN | POR | ESP | FRA | ARG | GRC | NZL | FIN; 11 | ITA; Ret | AUS; 11 | GBR; 6 | | 15th* | 3* | 5th | 1 |
| 1998 | Seat Cordoba WRC | 10 | (Spain) Oriol Gómez | MON | SWE | KEN | POR | ESP | FRA | ARG | GRC | NZL | FIN; Ret | | | | | - | 0 | 5th | 1 |
| 1998 | Seat Cordoba WRC | 10 | (Belgium) Marc Duez | | | | | | | | | | | ITA; 16 | AUS; Ret | | | - | 0 | 5th | 1 |
| 1998 | Seat Cordoba WRC | 10 | (United Kingdom) Gwyndaf Evans | | | | | | | | | | | | | GBR; Ret | | - | 0 | 5th | 1 |
| 1999 | Seat Cordoba WRC | 9 | (Finland) Harri Rovanperä | MON; 7 | SWE; 16 | KEN; 6 | POR; Ret | ESP; 14 | FRA; 13 | ARG; Ret | GRE; Ret | NZL; Ret | | | | | | 9th | 10 | 5th | 23 |
| 1999 | Seat Cordoba WRC Evo2 | 9 | (Finland) Harri Rovanperä | | | | | | | | | | FIN; 5 | CHN; 5 | ITA; 16 | AUS; 6 | GBR; 3 | 9th | 10 | 5th | 23 |
| 1999 | Seat Cordoba WRC | 10 | (Italy) Piero Liatti | MON; 6 | SWE | KEN; Ret | POR; Ret | ESP; 10 | FRA; 9 | ARG; Ret | GRE; Ret | | | | | | | 23rd | 1 | 5th | 23 |
| 1999 | Seat Cordoba WRC Evo2 | 10 | (Italy) Piero Liatti | | | | | | | | | | | CHN; Ret | ITA; 16 | | | 23rd | 1 | 5th | 23 |
| 1999 | Seat Cordoba WRC | 10 | (Finland) Marcus Grönholm | | SWE; Ret | | | | | | | | | | | | | 15th* | 5* | 5th | 23 |
| 1999 | Seat Cordoba WRC | 10 | (Finland) Toni Gardemeister | | | | | | | | | NZL; 3 | | | | | | 13th* | 6* | 5th | 23 |
| 1999 | Seat Cordoba WRC Evo2 | 10 | (Finland) Toni Gardemeister | | | | | | | | | | FIN; 6 | | | AUS; 16 | GBR; Ret | 13th* | 6* | 5th | 23 |
| 1999 | Seat Cordoba WRC Evo2 | 16 | (United Kingdom) Gwyndaf Evans | MON | SWE | KEN | POR | ESP | FRA | ARG | GRE | NZL | FIN | CHN | ITA | AUS | GBR; Ret | - | 0 | 5th | 23 |
| 1999 | Seat Cordoba WRC Evo2 | 20 | (Finland) Toni Gardemeister | MON | SWE | KEN | POR | ESP | FRA | ARG | GRE | | | CHN | ITA; Ret | | | 13th* | 6* | 5th | 23 |
| 2000 | SEAT Cordoba WRC Evo2 | 7 | (France) Didier Auriol | MON; Ret | SWE; 10 | KEN; 3 | POR; 10 | ESP; 13 | ARG; Ret | GRC; Ret | NZL; Ret | | | | | | | 12th | 4 | 5th | 11 |
| 2000 | SEAT Córdoba WRC Evo3 | 7 | (France) Didier Auriol | | | | | | | | | FIN; 11 | CYP; Ret | FRA; 8 | ITA; 17 | AUS; 8 | GBR; 9 | 12th | 4 | 5th | 11 |
| 2000 | SEAT Cordoba WRC Evo2 | 8 | (Finland) Toni Gardemeister | MON; 4 | SWE; Ret | KEN; Ret | POR; 9 | ESP; Ret | ARG; Ret | GRC; Ret | NZL; Ret | | | | | | | 13th | 4 | 5th | 11 |
| 2000 | SEAT Cordoba WRC Evo3 | 8 | (Finland) Toni Gardemeister | | | | | | | | | FIN; Ret | CYP; Ret | FRA; 11 | ITA; Ret | AUS; 6 | GBR; 12 | 13th | 4 | 5th | 11 |
| 2000 | SEAT Cordoba WRC Evo2 | 17 | (Finland) Harri Rovanperä | MON | SWE; 12 | KEN | POR | ESP | ARG | GRC | NZL | | | | | | | 9th* | 7* | 5th | 11 |
| 2000 | SEAT Cordoba WRC Evo3 | 17 | (Finland) Harri Rovanperä | | | | | | | | | FIN | CYP | FRA | ITA | AUS | GBR; 10 | 9th* | 7* | 5th | 11 |
| 2000 | SEAT Cordoba WRC Evo3 | 20 | (United Kingdom) Gwyndaf Evans | MON | SWE | KEN | POR | ESP | ARG | GRC | NZL | FIN | CYP | FRA | ITA | AUS | GBR; Ret | - | 0 | 5th | 11 |
| 2001 | SEAT Cordoba WRC Evo3 | - | (Spain) Marc Blázquez | MON | SWE | POR; 16 | ESP; Ret | ARG; Ret | CYP; Ret | GRC | KEN | FIN | NZL | ITA | FRA | AUS | GBR | – | 0 | - | 0 |
| 2001 | SEAT Cordoba WRC Evo3 | 21 | (Spain) Salvador Cañellas Jr. | MON | SWE | POR | ESP; Ret | ARG | CYP | GRC | KEN | FIN | NZL | ITA | FRA | AUS | GBR | – | 0 | - | 0 |
| 2001 | SEAT Cordoba WRC Evo3 | 24 | (United Kingdom) Gwyndaf Evans | MON | SWE | POR | ESP | ARG | CYP | GRC | KEN | FIN | NZL | ITA | FRA | AUS | GBR; Ret | – | 0 | - | 0 |
