= 2025 FIA Extreme H World Cup =

Hydrogen car racing season

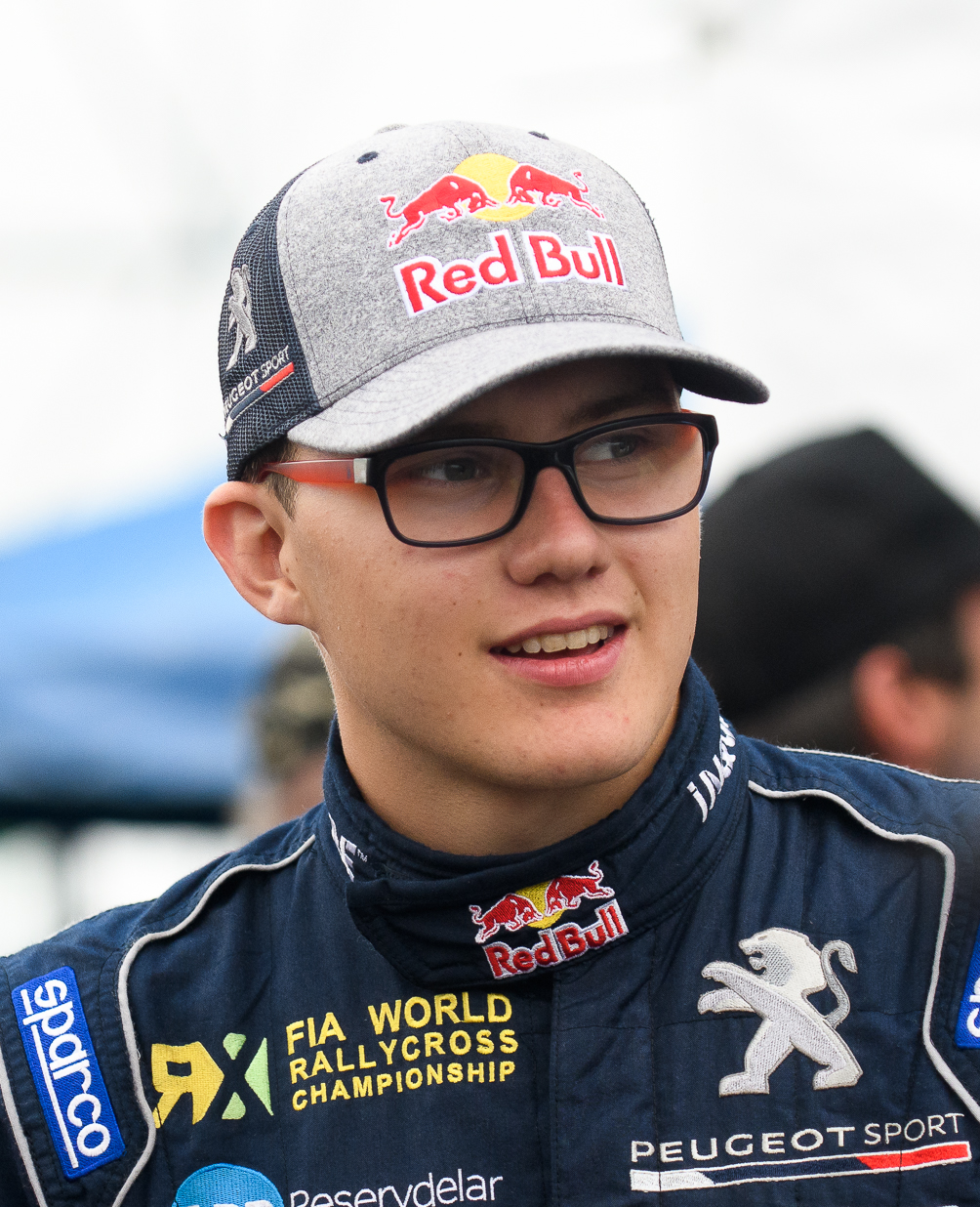
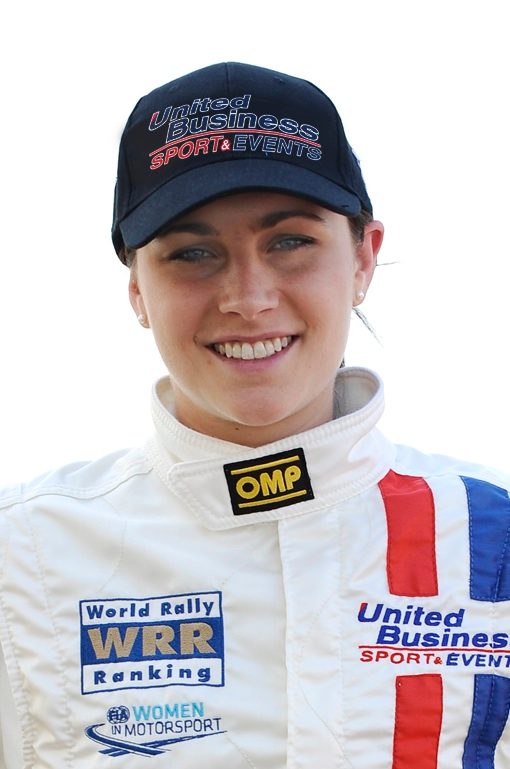
Kevin Hansen (left) and Molly Taylor (right) won the inaugural Extreme H title for Jameel Motorsport.

The 2025 FIA Extreme H World Cup was the inaugural edition of the Extreme H hydrogen off-road racing series. Held in Qiddiya City, Saudi Arabia against the backdrop of the Tuwaiq mountains, it marked the world's first-ever FIA-backed hydrogen racing competition. The three-day, multi-discipline event took place on 9–11 October 2025, days after its electric predecessor Extreme E bade farewell at the same venue.

Kevin Hansen and Molly Taylor, of local team Jameel Motorsport, were crowned champions, edging out Carl Cox Motorsport and Team EVEN in the final.

== Calendar ==
Round	Event	Location	Dates
1	FIA Extreme H World Cup	Qiddiya City, Saudi Arabia	9–11 October 2025

=== Race format ===
Much like in Extreme E, teams are required to field one male and one female driver, with equal driving duties and driver changes taking place in a designated switch zone. An Extreme H weekend consists of three disciplines—time trial, head-to-head and multi-car—each awarding pool points that contribute towards setting the starting grid for the World Cup final.

Competition starts with time trials in the form of single-car runs against the clock. Two sessions take place and combined times determine the standings. Head-to-head sees teams compete side-by-side in a series of drag races. A knockout system is used, with 16 heats (four for each team, two per driver) followed by the semi-finals and final. The third and final discipline, multi-car, inherits the off-road racing element of Extreme E. Two qualifying rounds are held, each with a pair of four-lap, four-car heats. Points scored across the three disciplines allow teams to choose their preferred starting spot for the grand final, with the novelty that all eight cars get to race each other in a four-lap shootout. The winner of the World Cup Final is declared the overall event winner.

== Teams and drivers ==
Eight teams made up the grid, with all but one carrying over from Extreme E's Final Lap. The exception was Acciona | Sainz, whose technical partner QEV Technologies entered under its commercial brand ZEROID. All teams used one of the identical Pioneer 25 hydrogen SUVs manufactured by Spark Racing Technology and consisted of a male and a female driver, who shared a car and had equal driving duties.

Team	No.	Drivers
(Austria) Team STARD	7	(United Kingdom) Patrick O'Donovan
(Austria) Team STARD	7	(United States) Amanda Sorensen
(Australia) Carl Cox Motor Sports Pty Ltd.	8	(Sweden) Klara Andersson
(Australia) Carl Cox Motor Sports Pty Ltd.	8	(Germany) Timo Scheider
(Sweden) Kristoffersson Motorsport AB	14	(Sweden) Mikaela Åhlin-Kottulinsky
(Sweden) Kristoffersson Motorsport AB	14	(Sweden) Johan Kristoffersson
(United Kingdom) JBX powered by Team Monaco	22	(Spain) Christine GZ
(United Kingdom) JBX powered by Team Monaco	22	(Finland) Tommi Hallman
(Spain) ZEROID Motorsport	55	(United States) Gray Leadbetter
(Spain) ZEROID Motorsport	55	(Jamaica) Fraser McConnell
(Saudi Arabia) Jameel Motorsport	80	(Sweden) Kevin Hansen
(Saudi Arabia) Jameel Motorsport	80	(Australia) Molly Taylor
(Sweden) Team Hansen	90	(Norway) Andreas Bakkerud
(Sweden) Team Hansen	90	(United Kingdom) Catie Munnings
(Sweden) Team EVEN	96	(Norway) Hedda Hosås
(Sweden) Team EVEN	96	(Norway) Ole Christian Veiby

- Veloce Racing was the first team to commit to Extreme H in February 2025, but did not appear on the final grid.

Reserve drivers
Drivers
(Germany) Claire Schönborn
(France) Adrien Tambay

== Results and standings ==
=== Pool points ===
Pos.	No.	Team	Time Trial		Head to Head		Multi Car Q1		Multi Car Q2		Total Points
Pos.	No.	Team	SS	TT	FL	H2H	SS	Q1	SS	Q2	Total Points
1	80	(Saudi Arabia) Jameel Motorsport		9	2	9		11		6	37
2	90	(Sweden) Team Hansen		8		6	2	8		11	35
3	14	(Sweden) Kristoffersson Motorsport AB		10		3		4	2	11	30
4	55	(Spain) ZEROID Motorsport	2	4		5		11		6	28
5	22	(United Kingdom) JBX powered by Team Monaco		6		7		6		8	27
6	8	(Australia) Carl Cox Motor Sports Pty Ltd.		5		8		4		8	25
7	96	(Sweden) Team EVEN		7		4		8		4	23
8	7	(Austria) Team STARD		3		10		6		4	23

=== World Cup Final ===
Pos.	No.	Team	Drivers	Laps	Time
1	80	(Saudi Arabia) Jameel Motorsport	(Sweden) Kevin Hansen (Australia) Molly Taylor	4	10:16.228
2	8	(Australia) Carl Cox Motor Sports Pty Ltd.	(Germany) Timo Scheider (Sweden) Klara Andersson	4	+7.068
3	96	(Sweden) Team EVEN	(Norway) Ole Christian Veiby (Norway) Hedda Hosås	4	+11.544
4	7	(Austria) Team STARD	(United Kingdom) Patrick O'Donovan (United States) Amanda Sorensen	4	+23.127
5	90	(Sweden) Team Hansen	(Norway) Andreas Bakkerud (United Kingdom) Catie Munnings	4	+26.274
6	14	(Sweden) Kristoffersson Motorsport AB	(Sweden) Johan Kristoffersson (Sweden) Mikaela Åhlin-Kottulinsky	4	+27.281
7	22	(United Kingdom) JBX powered by Team Monaco	(Finland) Tommi Hallman (Spain) Christine GZ	4	+2:07.636
8	55	(Spain) ZEROID Motorsport	(Jamaica) Fraser McConnell (United States) Gray Leadbetter	1	Accident

== See also ==
- 2025 Extreme E Championship
