= Team X44 =

Extreme E racing team

(United Kingdom) X44
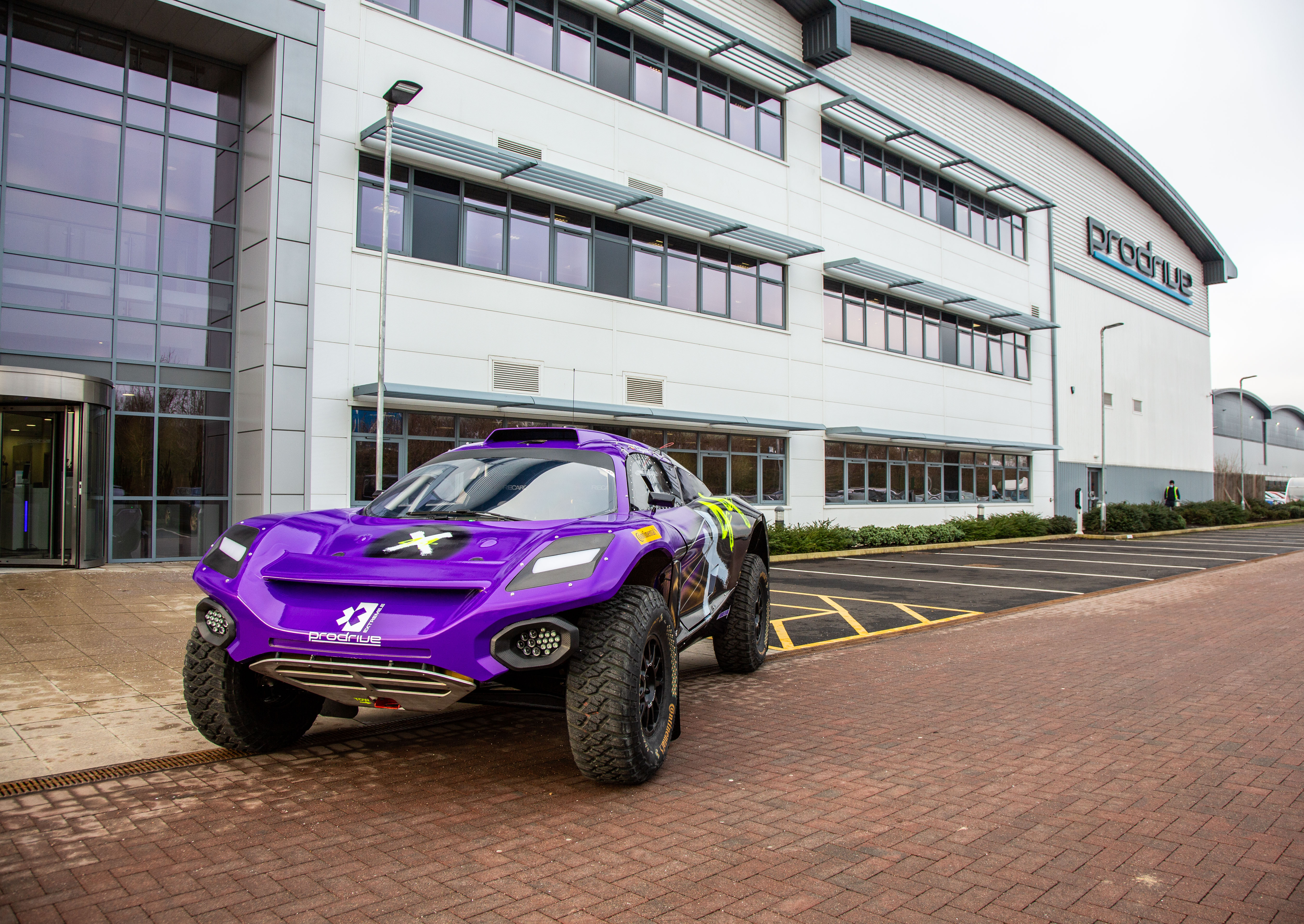
- Founded: 8 September 2020; 5 years ago
- No.: 44
- Nation: United Kingdom
- Founder(s): Lewis Hamilton
- Folded: 7 February 2024; 2 years ago
- Former names: Team X44 (2021–22); X44 Vida Carbon Racing (2022–23)
- Former series: Extreme E
- Noted drivers: (Spain) Cristina Gutiérrez (France) Sébastien Loeb (Jamaica) Fraser McConnell
- Races: 20
- Wins: 4
- Podiums: 10
- Best qualifiers: 8
- Super sectors: 5
- Points: 362
- Teams' Championships: 1 (2022)
- Drivers' Championships: 1 (2022)
- First entry: 2021 Desert X-Prix
- Last entry: 2023 Copper X-Prix 2
- First win: 2021 Jurassic X-Prix
- Last win: 2023 Island X-Prix 2

X44, who competed as Team X44 (2021–22) and as X44 Vida Carbon Racing (2022–23, for sponsorship reasons), was a British Extreme E racing team. The team was founded by seven-time Formula One World Champion, Lewis Hamilton. It won both the teams and drivers championships in the series in 2022, with drivers Sébastien Loeb and Cristina Gutiérrez.

== History ==
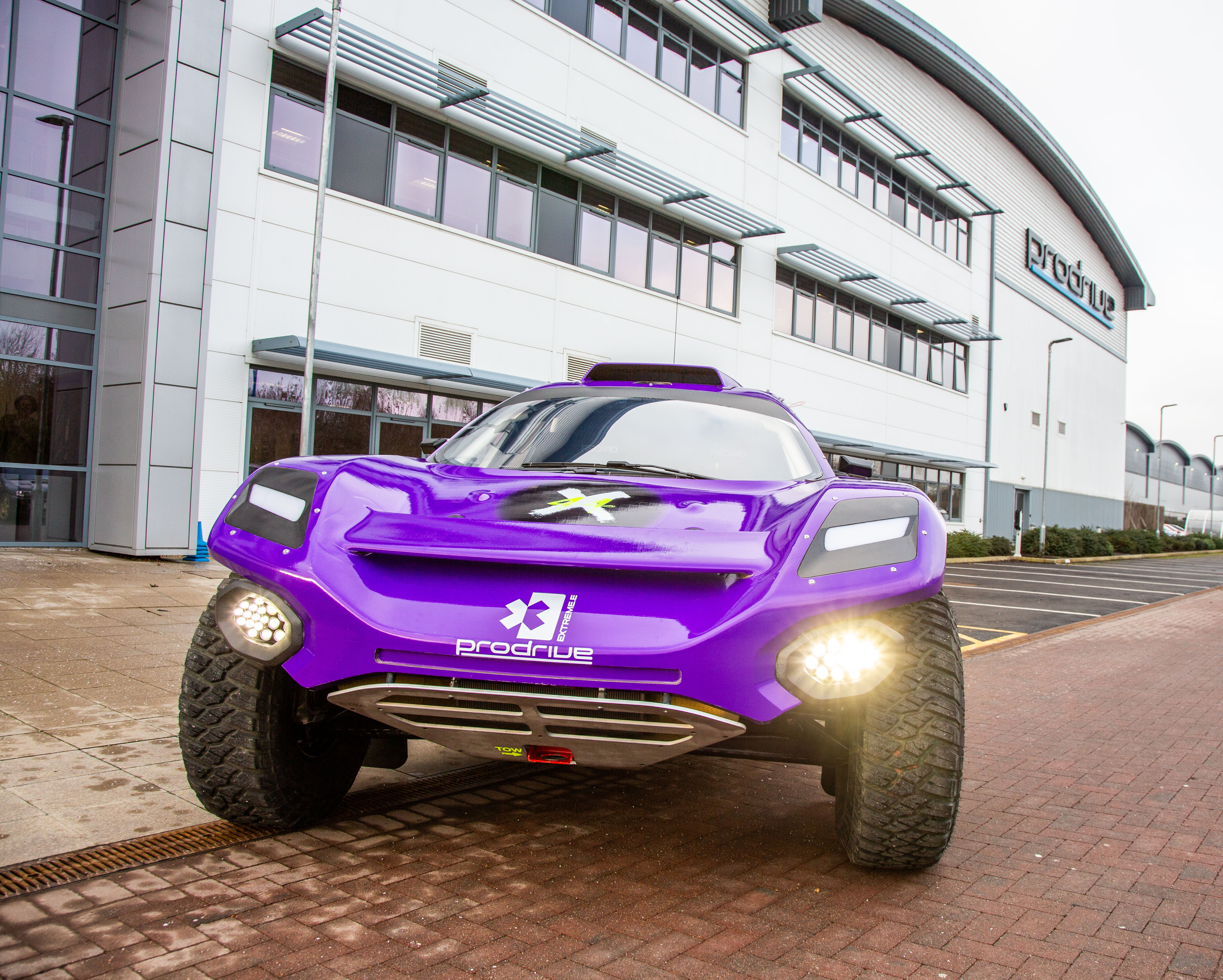
X44's car at Prodrive headquarters in Banbury

In September 2020, Lewis Hamilton announced that he had founded his own team for the newly established Extreme E racing series. The name "X44" was chosen due to Hamilton using the number on his Formula One car since 2014, when the drivers were able to choose their own numbers.

=== 2021 Season ===
In December 2020, X44 announced that Sébastien Loeb and Cristina Gutiérrez were signed as drivers for the team in the competitions first season. During the team's first season, they were the fastest qualifiers for each race and won one race. X44 finished the season in second place, behind champions Rosberg X Racing (RXR) (run by Hamilton's former teammate Nico Rosberg).

=== 2022 Season ===
Loeb and Gutiérrez returned for the 2022 season. In September 2022, X44 signed a title sponsorship deal with carbon credit investment firm Vida Carbon, and raced as X44 Vida Carbon Racing. The second season saw X44 finish on the podium four times in five races, including the team's only win of the season at the Copper X-Prix in Chile. Going into the final race of the season, RXR were ahead on points of X44. After the team managed to secure a podium finish, and with RXR coming last for the weekend, it saw the team finishing the season as champions, 5 points ahead of RXR. Sébastien Loeb and Cristina Gutiérrez also finished the season as champions in the drivers championship.

=== 2023 Season ===
For the 2023 season, X44 entered a partnership with British single-seater team Rodin Carlin and signed Jamaican driver Fraser McConnell to replace Loeb, alongside the returning Gutiérrez, and Stephanie Carlin as team principal. In the expanded format which saw teams racing 10 times during the season, X44 struggled to see the same form they'd had during the first two seasons. The team won two races, and finished on the podium a total of 4 times as X44 finished the season in 4th place overall.

=== Departure from Extreme E ===
Prior to the 2024 season, X44 announced that the team would not compete in further seasons of Extreme E. No reason was provided by the team for their departure from the series.

== Team results ==
=== Racing overview ===
| Year | Name | Car | Tyres | No. | G. | Drivers | Rounds | Pts. | Pos. |
|---|---|---|---|---|---|---|---|---|---|
| 2021 | (United Kingdom) Team X44 | Spark Odyssey 21 | C | 44. | F | (Spain) Cristina Gutiérrez | (1–5) | 155 | 2nd |
| 2021 | (United Kingdom) Team X44 | Spark Odyssey 21 | C | 44. | M | (France) Sébastien Loeb | (1–5) | 155 | 2nd |
| 2022 | (United Kingdom) Team X44 / X44 Vida Carbon Racing | Spark Odyssey 21 | C | 44. | F | (Spain) Cristina Gutiérrez | (1–5) | 86 | 1st |
| 2022 | (United Kingdom) Team X44 / X44 Vida Carbon Racing | Spark Odyssey 21 | C | 44. | M | (France) Sébastien Loeb | (1–5) | 86 | 1st |
| 2023 | (United Kingdom) X44 Vida Carbon Racing | Spark Odyssey 21 | C | 44. | F | (Spain) Cristina Gutiérrez | (1–10) | 121 | 4th |
| 2023 | (United Kingdom) X44 Vida Carbon Racing | Spark Odyssey 21 | C | 44. | M | (Jamaica) Fraser McConnell | (1–10) | 121 | 4th |

=== Racing summary ===
(The qualifying heats were introduced from the 2023 season)

| Year | Series | Races | Wins | Pod. | B/Qual. | Q/H | S/S | Pts. | Pos. |
|---|---|---|---|---|---|---|---|---|---|
| 2021 | Extreme E | 5 | 1 | 2 | 5 | – | 2 | 155 | 2nd |
| 2022 | Extreme E | 5 | 1 | 4 | 1 | – | 1 | 86 | 1st |
| 2023 | Extreme E | 10 | 2 | 3 | 2 | 5 | 2 | 121 | 4th |
| Total | | 20 | 4 | 10 | 8 | 5 | 5 | 362 | – |

=== Complete Extreme E results ===
(Races in bold indicate best qualifiers; races in italics indicate fastest super sector; ^{H} indicates qualifying heat winner (from season 3))

| Year | Entrant | 1 | 2 | 3 | 4 | 5 | 6 | 7 | 8 | 9 | 10 | Pts. | Pos. |
|---|---|---|---|---|---|---|---|---|---|---|---|---|---|
| 2021 | Team X44 | **DES** (Saudi Arabia); 3 | **OCE** (Senegal); 4 | **ARC** (Greenland); 4 | **ISL** (Italy); 5 | **JUR** (United Kingdom); 1 | | | | | | 155 | 2nd |
| 2022 | Team X44 / X44 Vida Carbon Racing | **DES** (Saudi Arabia); 3 | ISL1 (Italy); 6 | ISL2 (Italy); 2 | COP (Chile); 1 | ENE (Uruguay); 3 | | | | | | 86 | 1st |
| 2023 | X44 Vida Carbon Racing | DES1 (Saudi Arabia); 4 ^{H} | DES2 (Saudi Arabia); 6 | **HYD1** (Scotland); 1 ^{H} | HYD2 (Scotland); 9 | ISL1 (Italy); 8 | ISL2 (Italy); 8 | ISL1 (Italy); 9 | ISL2 (Italy); 1 ^{H} | **COP1** (Chile); 3 ^{H} | COP2 (Chile); 3 ^{H} | 121 | 4th |
