= Carl Cox =

British DJ (born 1962)

Carl Cox OBE

Background information
- Born: Carl Andrew Cox; 29 July 1962 (age 64); Oldham, England
- Genres: House; techno; tech house; minimal techno
- Occupations: DJ; producer; motorsport team principal
- Years active: 1977–present
- Label: Intec Digital
- Website: Carl Cox

Carl Andrew Cox OBE (born 29 July 1962) is a British house and techno club DJ, radio DJ, motorsport team owner and record producer. He lives in Frankston, Victoria, Australia.

Cox has won and been nominated for numerous awards. He has performed at numerous clubs and electronic music or dance events worldwide. He hosted a residency known as "Music is Revolution" every summer season at the Space Ibiza nightclub, from 2001 to 2016. He has featured his own "Carl Cox & Friends" stage at many festivals such as Ultra Music Festival, The BPM Festival and Tomorrowland. Cox has also served as a monthly DJ for BBC Radio 1's Essential Mix.

He runs the record label Intec Digital, which was founded around 1998 as Intec Records. Cox also had his own radio show and podcast, entitled Global, which he ran nearly 16 years, from 2001 until February 2017. In 2018, he founded Awesome Soundwave, a record label focused on live electronic music artists, with live artist and producer Christopher Coe.

== Early and personal life ==
Cox spent his early life in Carshalton, south London, and moved to Brighton in his late teens.

As of 2021, he is living in Hove but also spends time in Melbourne, where he owns a house in Frankston. At the start of the COVID-19 pandemic in 2020, Cox opted to return to his home in Frankston rather than Hove.

Cox was appointed Officer of the Order of the British Empire (OBE) in the 2026 Birthday Honours for services to music. He received the honour from Prince William at Windsor Castle on 10 November 2026.

== Music career ==
=== 1977–1990s ===
At age 15, Cox began working as a mobile DJ, finding a passion for disco music. At age 24, Cox used £1,000 he received from The Prince's Trust to buy his first DJ equipment. He began his music career around the same time that Chicago house music found its forefront in the world of dance music.

In the 1980s, Cox became a mainstage DJ in the electronica industry. He eventually became known as one of the founders of that sound and was part of the emerging British rave scene, and became renowned for the uncommon practice of three-deck mixing. He played at the first night of Danny Rampling's Shoom night after his return from Ibiza in the summer of 1987, a Balearic / Acid House night in London.

In the early 1990s, he released his debut single for Paul Oakenfold's Perfecto label, "I Want You (Forever)". Cox continued to create music, eventually embracing techno music that would soon become popular.

Mixmag described him as "absolutely smashing three decks to bits" during a set in 1995. He ran Ultimate Base at the now defunct Velvet Underground club on Charing Cross Road, London, in the mid- to late 1990s. In 1997, Cox was chosen as DJ Magazine's number one DJ in its top 100 poll. He was global resident DJ for BBC Radio 1's Essential Mix in 1998–99. Cox also played the Millennium on New Year's Eve 1999, by performing in Sydney, Australia, and again in Hawaii after flying back over the International Date Line.

=== 21st century ===
He broadcast over a decade's worth of Ibiza live mixes from Space, specifically from 2001 to 2016.

In 2001, Cox began a yearly residency at Space Ibiza, a nightclub in Ibiza, Spain. He began playing on the terrace for Space's "We Love... Space on the Terrace". Following that, he played on Thursdays inside the club. For fifteen years, Cox built his residency entitled "Music is Revolution". The final season of Cox's residency was entitled "The Final Chapter" and took place every Tuesday during the summer of 2016. Cox finished the residency on 20 September 2016 by playing a vinyl and CDJ, ten-hour set. Artists who joined Cox on his final night included tINI, Popof, Nic Fanciulli and DJ Sneak. Cox also played at the closing night of the club itself on 2 October 2016.

In 2004, Cox debuted the Carl Cox & Friends arena at Ultra Music Festival, which has since taken place for twelve years. In the film Can U Feel It?, a documentary about Ultra Music Festival, Cox explains that the concept of Carl Cox & Friends came about as a result of not only wanting to play longer sets at festivals, but also to give festival goers an experience within the festival, as Carl has far more creative control over his own stage. The stage is popular with festival goers, and has featured artists like Laurent Garnier, Nic Fanciulli, Loco Dice, Marco Carola, Maceo Plex and many more. Since he created the Carl Cox & Friends concept in 2004, this curated stage has taken place at other festivals and events including Awakenings, EDC Las Vegas, The BPM Festival, Ultra Europe, Tomorrowland, Amsterdam Dance Event and many others.

Cox has performed at clubs such as the Eclipse, Shelley's Laserdome, Sterns Nightclub, Heaven, Sir Henry's, Angels and The Haçienda, as well as raves for Fantazia, Dreamscape, NASA and Amnesia House.

After his residency at Space Ibiza, in 2017 Cox played three showcases at The BPM Festival, his stage at Ultra Music Festival, and at the Social Festival in Mexico and Colombia. Also in 2017, Cox was named the global ambassador of Ultra Music Festival's techno and house music concept, Resistance. He curated Pure Festival in Sydney and Melbourne, Australia, in April 2017.

After sixteen years of Cox's Global radio podcast, he announced via Facebook that he would no longer be working on the show and that it would end in February 2017.

In 2019, Cox travelled to Australia and worked with Gavin Campbell, producing a remix of Yothu Yindi's song "Treaty", performing live outdoors with Yothu Yindi & The Treaty Project at the Babylon Festival, Carapooee, Victoria, in February 2019. For 2020, he announced via the Goodwood website that he would be playing a summer festival DJ set at the first of the Three Friday nights at Goodwood Racecourse with a special dedication to the Lloyds before their departure.

In 2025, Carl Cox launched a Sunday residency at Ibiza's UNVRS as part of the venue's inaugural season, and returned in 2026 for a second consecutive residency running from June to October.

== Intec ==
Cox formed his own record label, Intec Records in 1998–99. Intec Records released music from 1999 to 2006. However, in 2006 he decided to put the label on a brief hiatus and relaunched it in 2010 as Intec Digital.

== Awesome Soundwave ==
In 2018, Cox teamed up with live artist Christopher Coe to form a new record label solely focused on live electronic artists. Awesome Soundwave is Cox's second label, after techno label Intec. The label debut featured Christopher Coe's 'MNTNs of SLNC' album. In 2019, the label made its debut at Amsterdam Dance Event with Awakenings Festival, and returned in 2022 for a daytime event at Ziggo Dome, Amsterdam. The label held a residency at DC-10 Ibiza in July–August 2022. In 2023, the label has an extensive roster of live and improvised artists, such as Marc Romboy, Hannes Bieger, Robert Babicz, An On Bast, Saytek and Australia's Honeysmack.

== In film ==
In 1999, Cox had a cameo in the British film Human Traffic as Pablo Hassan, the manager of the Asylum club.

Cox starred in a 2017 EDM-themed documentary titled What We Started with Martin Garrix showing thirty years of EDM history by focusing mainly on his and Martin Garrix's diverging careers. The documentary is co-written, produced and directed by Bert Marcus alongside executive producer and music supervisor Pete Tong.

== Carl Cox Motorsport ==
Cox set up Carl Cox Motorsport in New Zealand in 2013.

=== Motorcycle racing ===
Carl Cox Motorsport has become established within the world of motorcycle and sidecar racing, particularly at the Isle of Man TT Races where the team has enjoyed numerous successes. Prominent racers associated with the team include all-time TT Race record holder Michael Dunlop. In addition the team also supports sidecar crews Tracey Bryan and Jo Mickleson and Barry Smith and Stu Dawe, who competed in the NZ Suzuki Series F2 and F1 Championship, campaigning a F2 LCR 600 and an F1 LCR 1000 respectively.

=== Extreme E (2023) / Extreme H (2025–) ===
(United Kingdom) Carl Cox Motorsport
- Founded: 11 January 2023; 3 years ago
- Nation: United Kingdom
- Founder(s): Carl Cox
- Team principal(s): Timo Scheider
- Current series: FIA Extreme H World Cup
- Former series: Extreme E
- Current drivers: (Germany) Timo Scheider (Sweden) Klara Andersson
- Noted drivers: (Spain) Christine GZ (United States) Lia Block
- Races: 10
- Wins: 0
- Podiums: 1
- Best qualifiers: 0
- Super sectors: 0
- Points: 50
- First entry: 2023 Desert X-Prix
- Last entry: 2023 Copper X-Prix
- Website: www.carlcoxmotorsport.com

In January 2023, Carl Cox Motorsport has been confirmed as a new entrant in the electric off-road racing series Extreme E for the 2023 season with Christine GZ and Timo Scheider signed as drivers for the team. The team won its first podium by finishing third in Round 3. In Round 4, the team withdrew from the race after the car was damaged during qualifying. In July, Lia Block, the daughter of the late Ken Block, replaced Christine GZ at Round 5 for the rest of the season. The team finished in ninth place in the Teams' Championship in their debut season.

Prior to the 2024 season, Carl Cox Motorsport announced they will take a sabbatical to concentrate on entering Extreme H, a series similar to Extreme E but uses hydrogen-powered cars instead, in 2025. In September 2025, Carl Cox Motorsport officially entered the FIA Extreme H World Cup with Timo Scheider, who doubles as the team principal, and Klara Andersson.

==== Racing overview ====
Year	Name	Car	Tyres	No.	G.	Drivers	Rounds	Pts.	Pos.
2023	(United Kingdom) Carl Cox Motorsport	Spark Odyssey 21	**C**	8.	F	(Spain) Christine GZ (United States) Lia Block	(1–4) (5–10)	50	9th
2023	(United Kingdom) Carl Cox Motorsport	Spark Odyssey 21	**C**	8.	M	(Germany) Timo Scheider	(1–10)	50	9th

==== Racing summary ====
Year	Series	Races	Wins	Pod.	B/Qual.	S/S	Pts.	Pos.
2023	Extreme E	10	0	1	0	0	50	9th

==== Complete Extreme E results ====
(Races in bold indicate best qualifiers; races in italics indicate fastest super sector)

Year	Entrant	1	2	3	4	5	6	7	8	9	10	Pts.	Pos.
2023	Carl Cox Motorsport	DES1 (Saudi Arabia); 7	DES2 (Saudi Arabia); 9	HYD1 (Scotland); 3	HYD2 (Scotland); DNS	ISL-I1 (Italy); 9	ISL-I2 (Italy); 10	ISL-II1 (Italy); 5	ISL-II2 (Italy); 8	COP1 (Chile); 6	COP2 (Chile); 9	50	9th

== Discography ==
Studio albums

- At the End of the Cliche (1996)
- Phuture 2000 (1999)
- Second Sign (2005)
- All Roads Lead to the Dancefloor (2011)
- Electronic Generations (2022)

== Publications ==
- Oh Yes, Oh Yes!. London: White Rabbit, 2021. ISBN 978-1474616270.

Awards and achievements
Preceded by Judge Jules	DJ Magazine Number 1 DJ; 1996, 1997	Succeeded by Paul Oakenfold
