= Phuture 2000 =

Studio album by Carl Cox
- Released: 1999
- Genre: Techno, hard house
- Label: Moonshine; Worldwide Ultimatum/Edel
- Producer: Carl Cox

Carl Cox chronology
At the End of the Cliche (1996)	Phuture 2000 (1999)	Second Sign (2005)

Singles from Phuture 2000
- 1. "The Latin Theme" Released: 1998; 2. "Phuture 2000" Released: 1999; 3. "Dr. Funk" Released: 1999

Phuture 2000 is the second album by the English musician Carl Cox, released in 1999. "The Latin Theme" was the first single; the title track was released as a single in CD and limited edition DVD formats. The album peaked at No. 77 in the Official Albums Chart. "Dr. Funk" peaked at No. 26 in Billboard's Hot Dance Music chart, the highest charting American single from Phuture 2000. Cox labeled the album's music "breakbeat-cure-house funky techno".

== Production ==
Phuture 2000 was produced by Cox. He wanted to make it more dancefloor-friendly than his debut. He worked with the English musician Dave Angel on some of the tracks. Cox included some jungle songs, which he completed after an intended collaboration with Roni Size never materialized. His favorite instrument was the Clavia Nord Lead. "Dr. Funk" samples Jackie McLean's "Dr. Jackyll and Mister Funk". The closing track is a version of the title song, remixed by the British music duo Hybrid.

== Critical reception ==
Professional ratings
Review scores
Source	Rating
AllMusic	4/5 stars
Burton Mail	4/5 stars
(The New) Rolling Stone Album Guide	2/5 stars
The Virgin Encyclopedia of Nineties Music	4/5 stars
Vue Weekly	5/5 stars
The Windsor Star	4/5 stars

The Windsor Star stated that "Dr. Funk" "picks up on the slinky disco sound currently promulgated by French artists like Cassius and Dimitri from Paris." The Burton Mail praised the "hard house" and Cox's "talents for lavish production and ... ear for a good tune". The Toronto Star noted that "there's an endearing simplicity and kinetic practicality to [the] hard-house drivers". The Cambridge Evening News opined that Cox attempted to incorporate too many genres. The CMJ New Music Report said that Cox "uses a base recipe of multi-layered melodies and domineering rhythmic structures to give each song his authentic flavor." The Boston Phoenix concluded that "the hardness of [the] music veers far away from the joyfully plush and soulful deeps of most house music."

== Track listing ==
No.	Title	Length
1.	"Phuture 2000"
2.	"Yeah"
3.	"The Latin Theme"
4.	"The Mission"
5.	"Another Place"
6.	"Black Shaolin"
7.	"Been Smarter"
8.	"Deeper Mind"
9.	"Dr. Funk"
10.	"Angel's People"
11.	"Phuture 2000 (Hybrid Remix)"
