= Hedda Hosås =

Norwegian rallycross driver

- Nationality: Norway
- Born: 2 March 2001 (age 25) Voss, Norway

Extreme E career
- Debut season: 2022
- Former teams: Veloce Racing, JBXE, McLaren XE
- Starts: 15
- Wins: 0
- Podiums: 1
- Poles: 0
- Best finish: 9th in 2023

Hedda Hosås (born 2 March 2001) is a Norwegian rallycross driver who currently serves as the development driver for the future Extreme H series. She most recently competed for McLaren in the 2023 Extreme E season.

== Biography ==
=== Early career ===
Having initially started in motocross at the age of 15, Hosås got into car racing a year later when her dad introduced her to it. She ended up preferring the latter, but difficulties with budget and facilities led to her working as a mechanic to fund her career and travelling large distances only to train. With help from local sponsors and the mentorship of FIA World Rallycross Championship driver Ulrik Linnemann, she went to Denmark to race and test, where she caught the eye of Veloce Racing team manager Ian Davies, who signed her as the team's reserve driver for the 2021 Extreme E Championship.

=== Extreme E ===
Hosås was later named as the championship's reserve driver for the 2022 season-opening Desert X-Prix after usual reserve Tamara Molinaro was drafted in to race for Xite Energy Racing. Hosås herself ended up making her debut in the same event as a replacement for Veloce's Christine GZ, who injured herself in Q1. Partnering South African Lance Woolridge, they finished fourth in the crazy race and placed 10th overall. In July she was called up by Jenson Button's JBXE team for the following round in Sardinia, making up the youngest lineup in the grid with Kevin Hansen. The pair made it through to the final and later picked up a podium on their first race together, with third place at the Island X-Prix after a penalty for on-track winners Rosberg X Racing. Hosås would see out the season with JBXE, first alongside Hansen and later with Fraser McConnell, and eventually finished 12th in the drivers' championship.

Hosås remained with JBXE for the 2023 season, being paired with Formula One race winner Heikki Kovalainen and later countryman Andreas Bakkerud. Having secured two best finishes of fifth in the first part of the season, she moved to McLaren XE after the autumn break to replace Emma Gilmour, who was recovering from a crash in Sardinia. At her debut race in Antofagasta, Hosås and teammate Tanner Foust made the final on both days and achieved McLaren's first ever qualifying heat win in the series.

=== Extreme H ===
Hosås was chosen as the development driver for Extreme H, the hydrogen-powered off-road series set to replace Extreme E in 2025. She performed a test run with the new car, Spark Racing Technology's Pioneer 25, during the 2024 Hydro X-Prix in Scotland.

== Racing record ==
=== Complete Extreme E results ===
(key)

Year	Team	Car	1	2	3	4	5	6	7	8	9	10	Pos.	Points
2022	Veloce Racing	Spark ODYSSEY 21	DES; 10										12th	25
2022	JBXE	Spark ODYSSEY 21		ISL1; 3	ISL2; 8	COP; 8	ENE; 9						12th	25
2023	JBXE	Spark ODYSSEY 21	DES; 1; 8	DES; 2; 10	HYD; 1; 9	HYD; 2; 6	ISL1; 1; 10	ISL1; 2; 5	ISL2; 1; 7	ISL2; 2; 5			9th	60
2023	Neom McLaren Extreme E Team	Spark ODYSSEY 21									COP; 1; 4	COP; 2; 5	9th	60
2025	Team EVEN	Spark ODYSSEY 21	DES; 1; 2	DES; 2; 4									N/A	N/A
