= Extreme E =

Electric auto racing series

- Category: Electric off-road racing
- Country: International
- Inaugural season: 2021
- Folded: 2025
- Drivers: 20
- Teams: 10
- Constructors: Spark Racing Technology
- Tyre suppliers: Continental (2021–2024); Yokohama (2025)
- Last Drivers' champion: (Sweden) Mikaela Åhlin-Kottulinsky (Sweden) Johan Kristoffersson
- Last Teams' champion: (Germany) Rosberg X Racing
- Official website: extreme-e.com

Extreme E (XE) was an international off-road racing series that used spec silhouette electric SUVs to race in remote parts of the world, such as the Saudi Arabian desert or the Arctic. All racing locations were chosen to raise awareness for some aspects of climate change and Extreme E maintained a "Legacy Programme" to provide social and environmental support for those locations. The series also promoted gender equality in motorsport by mandating that all teams consist of a female and a male driver who share equal driving duties.

The first season began with the Desert X-Prix in Saudi Arabia in April 2021. After four seasons, the last of which was abandoned halfway, the series held one final event in 2025 and was replaced by hydrogen-based Extreme H.

== History ==
=== Preparations ===
Extreme E began in 2018 as a project led by Formula E founder Alejandro Agag and former driver Gil de Ferran. The series was presented to the public in January 2019 with an event in London. The announcement took place on board the ship St Helena which was to serve as "floating paddock" of the series, and also introduced Continental as tyre supplier and Brazilian company CBMM as niobium supplier for the vehicle production. Ali Russell was named Chief Marketing Officer, while Red Bull sports executives Kester Wilkinson and Nina Dreier signed on as event and marketing managers.

The first team to commit to the series, Venturi Racing, was announced in May 2019 (although they withdrew again before the first season). A couple of months later, German team Abt Sportsline was the second team to join the series.

In July 2019 a first prototype of the series vehicle, the Odyssey 21, was showcased at the Goodwood Festival of Speed and in December 2019 the provisional calendar for the first season in 2021 was revealed, featuring races in Senegal, Saudi Arabia, Nepal, Greenland and Brazil.

In 2020, the series started to attract attention by having Ken Block race the Extreme E car at the last stage of the Dakar Rally in January and in September Formula One world champion Lewis Hamilton announced the creation of his own Extreme E team, called X44. Former F1 champion and Hamilton's longtime team-mate and rival, Nico Rosberg also entered his own team into the competition with Rosberg X Racing, as did fellow champion Jenson Button with JBXE; Button also drove the 2021 Desert X-Prix for his team. A six-day drivers' test was held near the Châteaux de Lastours in southern France in late September and early October, featuring among confirmed series drivers some well-known racing drivers like Valtteri Bottas, Sébastien Loeb and Jean-Éric Vergne.

In November 2020, the vehicles were delivered to the teams, who could then apply their liveries and acquaint themselves with the car and its operations. The teams were limited to 100 km of private testing. A joint test with eight teams and a race simulation was held at MotorLand Aragón in December.

The St Helena departed from Liverpool on 20 February 2021, carrying equipment and 9 cars for the first race in April and arrived in Jeddah on 14 March.

=== 2021 season ===
The first season began with the Desert X-Prix in Saudi Arabia in April 2021 and ended in December in the United Kingdom. Nine teams were competing over five rounds. Because of the COVID-19 pandemic the calendar had to be modified during the season with two European rounds replacing the two planned events in South America. Rosberg X Racing with drivers Molly Taylor and Johan Kristoffersson emerged as the first Extreme E champions.

=== 2022 season ===
The second season started in February 2022, again in Saudi Arabia. McLaren joined the series as a new team. The season ended in November 2022 in Uruguay. The second season was won by Team X44 with drivers Cristina Gutiérrez and Sébastien Loeb.

=== 2023 season ===
The third season started once again in Saudi Arabia in March 2023. Xite Energy Racing left the series and Carl Cox Motorsport joined the series as a new team. The season ended in December 2023 in Chile. The third season was won by Rosberg X Racing with drivers Johan Kristoffersson and Mikaela Åhlin-Kottulinsky.

=== 2024 season ===
The fourth season started in Saudi Arabia in February 2024. Abt Cupra XE, X44, Chip Ganassi Racing and Carl Cox Motorsport left the series, while SUN Minimeal XE Team and Legacy Motor Club joined the series as new entrants. On 6 September, a week before the scheduled Island X-Prix I, Extreme E cancelled the remaining rounds in Sardinia and Phoenix. At the time of the cancellation, Veloce Racing's Kevin Hansen and Molly Taylor were the championship leaders.

=== 2025 season and transition to Extreme H ===
Prior to the 2022 season's opening race, Agag announced the creation of a similar off-road championship called Extreme H, featuring a hydrogen fuel cell version of the Spark Odyssey 21 car. In August 2023, the FIA and Extreme E signed a non-binding Memorandum of Understanding to set out a framework for Extreme H. The inaugural season would be in 2025 and the series would be recognized as an FIA World Championship in 2026 if the requisite criteria are met. In January 2024, the organisation announced that Extreme H would replace Extreme E rather than co-exist.

In September 2025, Extreme E announced it would run one final race called The Final Lap ahead of the FIA Extreme H World Cup debut. The Final Lap would be held in Qiddiya City, Saudi Arabia on 4 and 5 October 2025 and the inaugural Extreme H event would follow on 9 to 11 October. Six of the eight teams were new: STARD, Jameel Motorsport, Kristoffersson Motorsport (KMS), Team Hansen, Team EVEN and returnees Carl Cox Motorsport joined in place of Veloce Racing, Rosberg X Racing, SUN Minimeal Team, Andretti Altawkilat, McLaren XE and Legacy Motor Club. The event saw Yokohama replace Continental as tyre supplier. The last ever Extreme E race victory went to Team Hansen duo Andreas Bakkerud and Catie Munnings.

== Champions ==
Drivers' Champions
Season	Drivers	Team	Wins	Podiums	SS	Points	Clinched	Margin
2021	(Sweden) Johan Kristoffersson (Australia) Molly Taylor	(Germany) Rosberg X Racing	3	3	0	133	Round 5 of 5	12
2022	(Spain) Cristina Gutiérrez (France) Sébastien Loeb	(United Kingdom) X44 Vida Carbon Racing	1	4	1	73	Round 5 of 5	5
2023	(Sweden) Johan Kristoffersson (Sweden) Mikaela Åhlin-Kottulinsky	(Germany) Rosberg X Racing	3	7	1	159	Round 10 of 10	15
2024	season abandoned							
2025	not awarded							

Teams' Champions
Season	Team	Wins	Podiums	SS	Points	Clinched	Margin
2021	(Germany) Rosberg X Racing	3	3	0	155	Round 5 of 5	0
2022	(United Kingdom) X44 Vida Carbon Racing	1	4	1	86	Round 5 of 5	2
2023	(Germany) Rosberg X Racing	3	7	1	182	Round 10 of 10	11
2024	season abandoned						
2025	not awarded						

== Race format ==
Teams consist of one female and one male driver, who share equal driving duties. In each session, the team must complete two or four laps (depending on the length of the course), with both team members splitting their driving time in half. The driver switch takes place in a designated "switch zone", where a speed limit and a minimal switch time are enforced for safety reasons.

The format of the Extreme E race weekend evolved over the course of the first three seasons. Under the current format, a weekend is composed of two separate rounds, one on Saturday and the other on Sunday. Racing starts with two qualifying sessions, each consisting of two five-car heats. Then, a pair of official races take place to determine the event winner. Qualifying is designed so that each team competes in two heats, one for each session. A team's finishing position contributes towards the combined qualifying results, based on intermediate points (10, 8, 6, 4 and 2 for each heat). Championship points were awarded for overall qualifying in season one—per the current system, only the winner of a qualifying heat earns a championship point. The qualifying results determine to which race each teams advances: the top five qualifiers progress to the "Grand Final" and the bottom five to the "Redemption Race". The Grand Final decides positions one to five in the final event classification, with the Redemption Race dictating positions six to ten.

Additionally, a "super sector" is defined, where two extra points are awarded to the fastest team through that sector over the event. During a session, one "Hyperdrive" can be used per lap, which provides extra power for four seconds.

== Vehicle ==
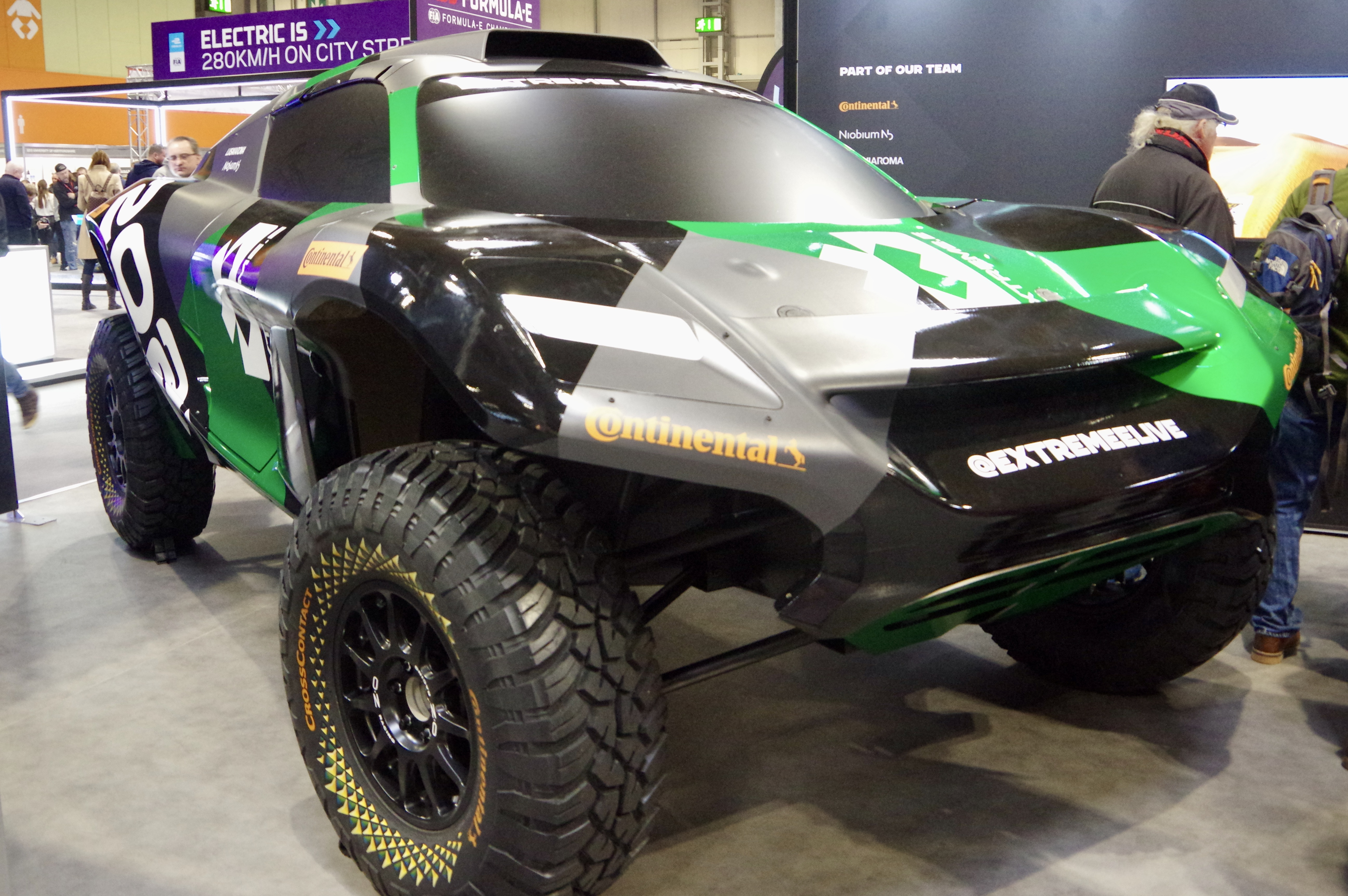
Extreme E car: the Spark Odyssey 21

The Spark Odyssey 21 electric SUV was unveiled as the series' competition vehicle at Goodwood Festival of Speed on 5 July 2019. The vehicle is manufactured by Spark Racing Technology, the constructors of the Formula E cars, with a battery produced by Williams Advanced Engineering. The car is fitted with a niobium-reinforced steel alloy tubular frame, as well as crash structure and roll cage. It weighs 1,650 kg (3,640 lb), and is capable of 0 to 60 mph in 4.5 seconds, with 400 kW (540 hp) of power.

The Odyssey 21 was first showcased at the 2020 Dakar Rally in Saudi Arabia. Guerlain Chicherit drove the vehicle during shakedown one day before the race start and Ken Block competed with it on the final stage between Haradh and Al-Qiddiya, finishing with the third fastest time in the car category.

== Teams and drivers ==
The Extreme E regulations require each team to consist of a female and a male driver who share equal driving duties (with a driver swap in the middle of each race).

In September 2019, Extreme E released a list of drivers who had registered official interest in driving in the series. Teams could select drivers from this list, but they could also sign any other driver. In November, a second group of inductees joined the programme. The first actual driver signing, Sara Price with Chip Ganassi Racing, was announced in June 2020.

Reserve drivers can substitute any driver before the beginning of each subsequent rounds. The series also employs "championship drivers" as reserves and advisors, while guest championship drivers are occasionally present to work with the full-time members. Championship drivers can be hired to permanent seats by teams such as Jutta Kleinschmidt by Abt Cupra in 2021.

== Race locations and legacy programme ==
Extreme E race locations outside Saudi Arabia
Desert X-Prix race locations in Saudi Arabia

Extreme E races in locations already damaged by climate change in order to bring awareness to the problems posed by climate change and have consulted ecological experts to keep the impact of their presence to a minimum. The series maintains a so-called "legacy programme" which intends to provide support for social and environmental challenges at the racing locations.

Environment	Host nation	Location	Season	Legacy Programme
Arctic	Greenland	Kangerlussuaq, Russell Glacier	2021	UNICEF youth climate education and children's rights awareness programme, Black ice collection
Copper	Chile	Calama, Antofagasta Region	2022	Biodiversity, Loa water frog conservation
Copper	Chile	Calama, Antofagasta Region	2023	Biodiversity, Loa water frog conservation
Desert	Saudi Arabia	Sharaan, Al-'Ula	2021	Red Sea turtle conservation
Desert	Saudi Arabia	Neom	2022	Red Sea turtle conservation
Desert	Saudi Arabia	Neom	2023	Several rewilding initiatives
Desert	Saudi Arabia	Jeddah	2024	Several rewilding initiatives
Desert	Saudi Arabia	Qiddiya City	2025	Several rewilding initiatives
Energy	Uruguay	José Ignacio	2022	Marine conservation, ecotourism, and renewable energy awareness
Hydro	(United Kingdom) Great Britain	Dumfries and Galloway, Scotland	2023	River restoration
Hydro	(United Kingdom) Great Britain	Dumfries and Galloway, Scotland	2024	River restoration
Island	Italy	Capo Teulada, Sardinia	2021	Blue and green carbon stores
Island	Italy	Capo Teulada, Sardinia	2022	Blue and green carbon stores
Island	Italy	Capo Teulada, Sardinia	2023	Blue and green carbon stores
Jurassic	(United Kingdom) Great Britain	Bovington Camp, Dorset	2021	Beaver Reintroduction, in partnership with The National Trust
Ocean	Senegal	Lac Rose	2021	Mangrove restoration

=== Cancelled and planned locations ===
Several Extreme E race venues were announced but later cancelled due to the COVID-19 pandemic, logistical constraints, or changes to the series calendar.

Environment	Host nation	Location	Season	Planned Date(s)	Cancellation Reason
Mountain	Nepal	Kali Gandaki Gorge	2021	14–15 May 2021	Cancelled due to international travel restrictions and COVID-19 pandemic.
Amazon	Brazil	Santarém	2021	23–24 October 2021	Cancelled due to COVID-19 pandemic and logistics.
Glacier	Argentina	Ushuaia	2021	11–12 December 2021	Cancelled due to COVID-19 pandemic and calendar reshuffle.
Ocean	Scotland (Dumfries and Galloway) or Senegal (Lac Rose)	Scotland or Senegal	2022	7–8 May 2022	Cancelled; calendar reshaped, event not held.
Arctic	Greenland or Iceland	Kangerlussuaq (Greenland) or Iceland	2022	9–10 July 2022	Cancelled; replaced by Sardinia double-header.
Amazon	Brazil, United States, or Argentina	Candidate South America/USA locations	2023	16–17 September 2023	Cancelled; replaced by Sardinia double-header due to logistical issues.
Island	Italy	Sardinia	2024	14–15 September 2024	Cancelled after the remainder of Season 4 was called off.
Island	Italy	Sardinia	2024	21–22 September 2024	Cancelled after the remainder of Season 4 was called off.
Valley	United States	Phoenix, Arizona	2024	23–24 November 2024	Cancelled after the remainder of Season 4 was called off.

== Logistics ==
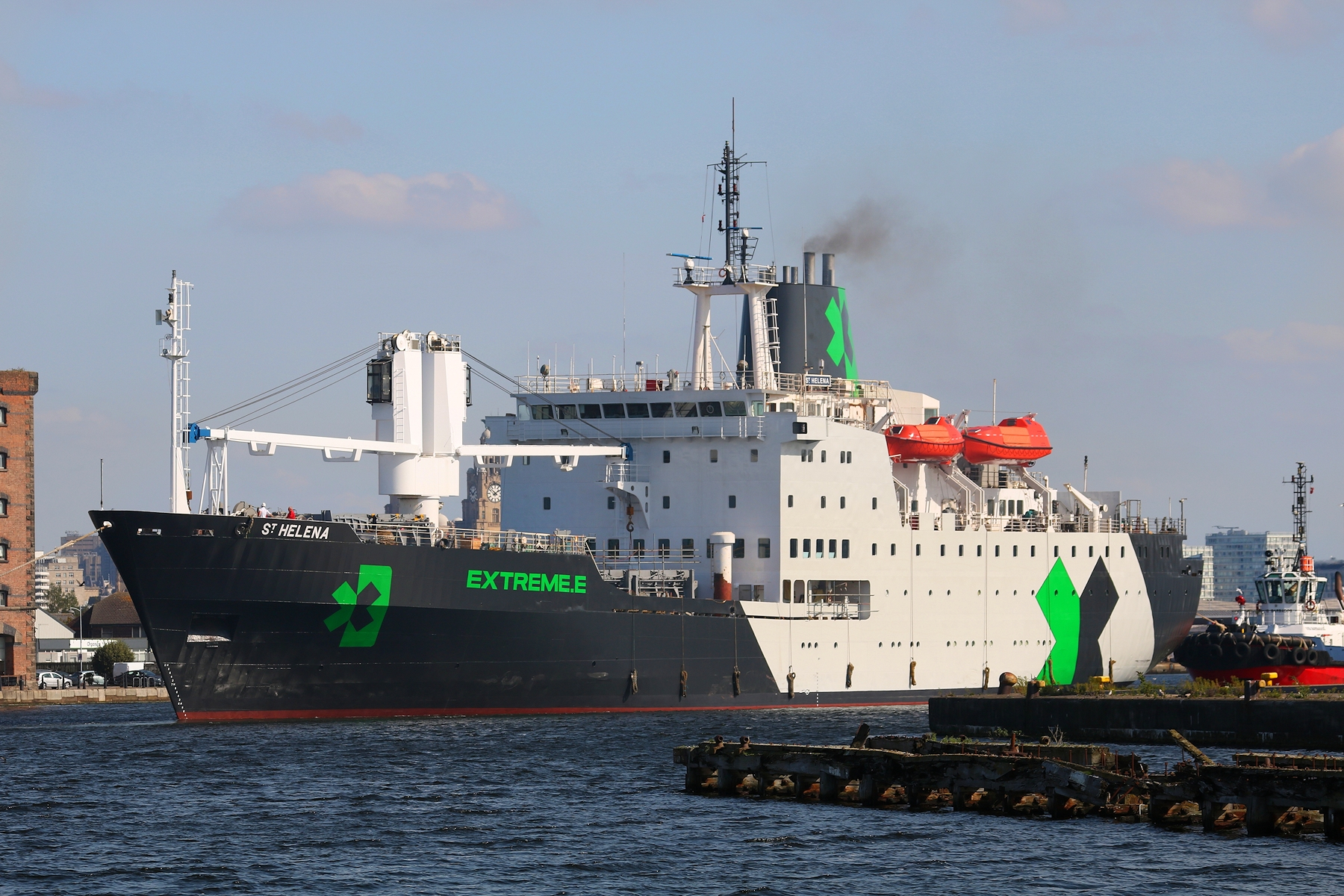
The RMS St Helena with Extreme E livery

The RMS St Helena, a former Royal Mail Ship, serves as a "floating paddock" and headquarters for the series. It is used to carry all equipment, including the cars, to the race locations (or nearest port) in order to reduce carbon emissions compared to air freight. The ship's environmental footprint has been reduced by converting the propulsion units and the generators to run on ultra-low-sulfur diesel. The St Helena also serves as a research vessel, carrying scientists and potentially holding conferences at the race locations.

Extreme E uses hydrogen fuel cell generators supplied by AFC Energy. Hydrogen fuel is generated from water and solar energy and is then used to charge the vehicles' batteries, allowing for a sustainable off-the-grid power generation.

== Broadcasts and documentary series ==
Aurora Media Worldwide and North One Television were selected as host broadcasters, producing live race coverage and a supporting documentary series, combining sport and scientific stories. Academy Award-winning filmmaker Fisher Stevens was hired as the series artistic director to produce the broadcasts. Gil de Ferran said that the "viewers can expect a completely new way of consuming sport, with each episode telling not just the story of a race, but the wider race of awareness and the need to protect these remote and challenging environments being explored by Extreme E."

Before the first season in 2021, a three-part TV series has been produced to document the process of creating a brand-new racing series. The first episode premiered in June 2020 on Channel 4 in the UK, followed a few days later on Eurosport.

The live broadcast is presented by Andrew Coley and Jennie Gow from a studio in London, and Layla Anna-Lee is the on-site reporter and also presents a 20-episode magazine show called Electric Odyssey.

== See also ==
- Electric motorsport
- Formula E
- Extreme H
