= JBXE =

Extreme E racing team

(United Kingdom) JBX
- Founded: January 2021; 5 years ago
- Nation: United Kingdom
- Founder(s): Jenson Button
- Former names: JBXE
- Current series: Extreme H
- Former series: Extreme E
- Current drivers: (Finland) Tommi Hallman (Spain) Christine GZ
- Noted drivers: (Sweden) Mikaela Åhlin-Kottulinsky (United Kingdom) Jenson Button (Sweden) Kevin Hansen (Australia) Molly Taylor (Finland) Heikki Kovalainen (Norway) Andreas Bakkerud (Norway) Hedda Hosås (Saudi Arabia) Dania Akeel (United States) Amanda Sorensen (Italy) Tamara Molinaro
- Races: 22
- Wins: 0
- Podiums: 5
- Best qualifiers: 0
- Super sectors: 0
- Points: 217
- First entry: 2021 Desert X-Prix
- Last entry: Saudi arabica X-prix 2025
- Website: https://www.jbxe.co/

JBX, racing as JBX Powered by Team Monaco for sponsorship reasons, is an FIA Extreme H World Cup racing team. The team was founded by the 2009 Formula One World Champion Jenson Button as JBXE and takes part in the series that highlights the impacts of climate change.

== History ==
=== Extreme E ===
In January 2021, it was announced that Jenson Button had founded his own team for the newly established racing series. The name "JBXE" takes its name from the initials of Jenson Button, with the XE standing for Extreme E. It was initially announced that Button would be driving in the team himself alongside Mikaela Åhlin-Kottulinsky. However, Button decided to step down as the driver of his own team after the team's debut race and was replaced by Kevin Hansen. With a second-place finish in the final race of the inaugural season, JBXE secured third place overall, beating the Andretti United Extreme E by 2 points.

In the 2022 season, Molly Taylor (round 1), Hedda Hosås (rounds 2 to 5), Kevin Hansen (rounds 1 to 4) and Fraser McConnell (round 5) raced for JBXE. The team finished the season in ninth place.

JBXE retained Hosås and signed Heikki Kovalainen for the 2023 season. Andreas Bakkerud replaced Kovalainen from round 3 til the end of the season. Hosås moved to McLaren XE for the final two rounds of the season to replace Emma Gilmour and was replaced in turn by championship reserve driver Tamara Molinaro.

=== Extreme H ===
In September 2025, the team, now called JBX Powered by Team Monaco, confirmed its entry to the FIA Extreme H World Cup with Tommi Hallman and Christine GZ.

== Team results ==
=== Racing overview ===
* – Indicates cancelled season.

| Year | Name | Car | Tyres | No. | G. | Drivers | Rounds | Pts. | Pos. |
|---|---|---|---|---|---|---|---|---|---|
| 2021 | (United Kingdom) JBXE | Spark Odyssey 21 | C | 22. | F | (Sweden) Mikaela Åhlin-Kottulinsky | (1–5) | 119 | 3rd |
| 2021 | (United Kingdom) JBXE | Spark Odyssey 21 | C | 22. | M | (United Kingdom) Jenson Button | (1) | 119 | 3rd |
| 2021 | (United Kingdom) JBXE | Spark Odyssey 21 | C | 22. | M | (Sweden) Kevin Hansen | (2–5) | 119 | 3rd |
| 2022 | (United Kingdom) JBXE | Spark Odyssey 21 | C | 22. | F | (Australia) Molly Taylor | (1) | 27 | 9th |
| 2022 | (United Kingdom) JBXE | Spark Odyssey 21 | C | 22. | F | (Norway) Hedda Hosås | (2–5) | 27 | 9th |
| 2022 | (United Kingdom) JBXE | Spark Odyssey 21 | C | 22. | M | (Sweden) Kevin Hansen | (1–4) | 27 | 9th |
| 2022 | (United Kingdom) JBXE | Spark Odyssey 21 | C | 22. | M | (Jamaica) Fraser McConnell | (5) | 27 | 9th |
| 2023 | (United Kingdom) JBXE | Spark Odyssey 21 | C | 22. | F | (Norway) Hedda Hosås | (1–8) | 50 | 10th |
| 2023 | (United Kingdom) JBXE | Spark Odyssey 21 | C | 22. | F | (Italy) Tamara Molinaro | (9-10) | 50 | 10th |
| 2023 | (United Kingdom) JBXE | Spark Odyssey 21 | C | 22. | M | (Finland) Heikki Kovalainen | (1–2) | 50 | 10th |
| 2023 | (United Kingdom) JBXE | Spark Odyssey 21 | C | 22. | M | (Norway) Andreas Bakkerud | (3–10) | 50 | 10th |
| 2024 | (United Kingdom) JBXE | Spark Odyssey 21 | C | 22. | F | (Saudi Arabia) Dania Akeel | (1–2) | 21* | 8th* |
| 2024 | (United Kingdom) JBXE | Spark Odyssey 21 | C | 22. | F | (United States) Amanda Sorensen | (3-4) | 21* | 8th* |
| 2024 | (United Kingdom) JBXE | Spark Odyssey 21 | C | 22. | M | | | 21* | 8th* |
| 2024 | (United Kingdom) JBXE | Spark Odyssey 21 | C | 22. | M | (Norway) Andreas Bakkerud | (1–4) | 21* | 8th* |

=== Racing summary ===
| Year | Series | Races | Wins | Pod. | B/Qual. | S/S | Pts. | Pos. |
|---|---|---|---|---|---|---|---|---|
| 2021 | Extreme E | 5 | 0 | 4 | 0 | 0 | 119 | 3rd |
| 2022 | Extreme E | 5 | 0 | 1 | 0 | 0 | 27 | 9th |
| 2023 | Extreme E | 10 | 0 | 0 | 0 | 0 | 50 | 10th |
| 2024 | Extreme E | 2 | 0 | 0 | 0 | 0 | 21* | 8th* |
| Total | | 22 | 0 | 5 | 0 | 0 | 217 | – |

=== Complete Extreme E results ===
(Races in bold indicate best qualifiers; races in italics indicate fastest super sector)

| Year | Entrant | 1 | 2 | 3 | 4 | 5 | 6 | 7 | 8 | 9 | 10 | Pts. | Pos. |
|---|---|---|---|---|---|---|---|---|---|---|---|---|---|
| 2021 | JBXE | DES (Saudi Arabia); 6 | OCE (Senegal); 3 | ARC (Greenland); 2 | ISL (Italy); 3 | JUR (United Kingdom); 2 | | | | | | 119 | 3rd |
| 2022 | JBXE | DES (Saudi Arabia); 9 | ISL1 (Italy); 3 | ISL2 (Italy); 8 | COP (Chile); 8 | ENE (Uruguay); 9 | | | | | | 27 | 9th |
| 2023 | JBXE | DES1 (Saudi Arabia); 8 | DES2 (Saudi Arabia); 10 | HYD1 (Scotland); 9 | HYD2 (Scotland); 6 | ISL1 (Italy); 10 | ISL2 (Italy); 5 | ISL3 (Italy); 7 | ISL4 (Italy); 5 | COP1 (Chile); 8 | COP2 (Chile); 8 | 50 | 10th |
| 2024 | JBXE | DES1 (Saudi Arabia); 7 | DES2 (Saudi Arabia); 8 | HYD1 (Scotland); 7 | HYD2 (Scotland); 8 | | | | | | | 21* | 8th* |
