= Extreme H =

Hydrogen auto racing series

- Category: Hydrogen off-road racing
- Country: International
- Inaugural season: 2025
- Drivers: 16
- Teams: 8
- Constructors: Spark Racing Technology
- Tyre suppliers: Yokohama Tyres
- Drivers' champion: (Sweden) Kevin Hansen (Australia) Molly Taylor
- Teams' champion: (Saudi Arabia) Jameel Motorsport
- Official website: fiaextremeh.com

Extreme H (XH), officially the FIA Extreme H World Cup, is an FIA-sanctioned international off-road racing series for spec silhouette hydrogen SUVs. Born from the ashes of the all-electric Extreme E, it is the first-ever hydrogen-powered racing championship. Extreme H followed its predecessor's lead in highlighting climate change by racing in remote parts of the world and promoting gender equality with mixed two-driver lineups.

It debuted in 2025 with a standalone event in Saudi Arabia.

== History ==
In 2022, Extreme E management announced an intent to create a new sister racing series for hydrogen vehicles, to be called Extreme H, by 2024. This would have a similar format to Extreme E and feature a hydrogen fuel cell version of the Spark Odyssey 21 car. In August 2023, the Fédération Internationale de l'Automobile (FIA) and Extreme E signed a non-binding Memorandum of Understanding to set out a framework for Extreme H. The inaugural season would be in 2025 and the series would be recognized as an FIA World Championship in 2026 should the requisite criteria be met. In January 2024, the organisation announced that Extreme H would replace Extreme E rather than co-exist.

Spark Racing Technology, the chassis supplier for Extreme E and all three generations of Formula E, was tasked with designing and building the car. The first prototype, the Spark Pioneer 25, was unveiled in June 2024 aboard the RMS St Helena in London, adorned in a special Red Bull livery. Hedda Hosås and Adrien Tambay were named as official test drivers for the project. The development phase was completed in June 2025, and the car performed its first public outing at the Goodwood Festival of Speed a month later in the hands of Catie Munnings.

Extreme H premiered on 9–11 October 2025 with a single, three-day FIA World Cup at Qiddiya City, Saudi Arabia. Held in the aftermath of Extreme E's 'The Final Lap' farewell event, it attracted eight entrants, including Extreme E regulars Carl Cox Motorsport and Jenson Button's JBX team (formerly JBXE), FIA World Rallycross Championship powerhouses Team Hansen and Kristoffersson Motorsport, and four newcomers: Team EVEN, Jameel Motorsport, STARD and ZEROID Motorsport. Despite being the first team to announce its intention to enter the series, Veloce Racing did not compete in the inaugural World Cup. Kevin Hansen and Molly Taylor, of local team Jameel Motorsport, were crowned champions, edging out Carl Cox and Team EVEN in the final.

The second edition of the Extreme H World Cup was initially announced for 29–31 October 2026 again at Qiddiya City. However, the event was postponed until 2027 due to logistical challenges presented by the 2026 Iran war. Veloce Racing had been set to field Kevin Hansen and Molly Taylor.

== Format ==
Much like in Extreme E, teams are required to field one male and one female driver, with equal driving duties and driver changes taking place in a designated switch zone. An Extreme H weekend consists of three disciplines—time trial, head-to-head and multi-car—each awarding qualifying points that contribute towards setting the starting grid for the World Cup final.

Competition starts with time trials in the form of single-car runs against the clock. Two sessions take place and combined times determine the standings. Head-to-head sees teams compete side-by-side in a series of drag races. A knockout system is used, with 16 heats (four for each team, two per driver) followed by the semi-finals and final. The third and final discipline, multi-car, inherits the off-road racing element of Extreme E. Two qualifying rounds are held, each with a pair of four-lap, four-car heats. Points scored across the three disciplines allow teams to choose their preferred starting spot for the grand final, with the novelty that all eight cars get to race each other in a four-lap shootout. The winner of the World Cup Final is declared the overall event winner.

== Vehicle ==
The Spark Pioneer 25 hydrogen SUV was unveiled as the series' competition vehicle in Central London, aboard the RMS St Helena, on 27 June 2024. The vehicle is manufactured by Spark Racing Technology, the constructors of the Extreme E and Formula E cars, with a 75 kW (101 hp) Symbio hydrogen fuel cell and a 325 kW (436 hp) Fortescue Zero battery. The car is fitted with a niobium-reinforced steel alloy tubular frame with a central driving seat, as well as crash structure and roll cage. It weighs 2,200 kg (4,900 lb), and is capable of 0 to 60 mph in 4.5 seconds and scaling gradients of up to 130%, with a total 400 kW (540 hp) of power. Yokohama was announced as the official tyre supplier and will use a model based on the Geolandar X-AT.

The Pioneer 25 was first showcased at the Goodwood Festival of Speed in England on 10–13 July 2025. Catie Munnings drove the car up the hillclimb for the first time on the opening day, before Cristina Gutiérrez, Klara Andersson and Amanda Sorensen took turns over the remainder of the event.

== Broadcasting ==
Extreme H has reached a number of broadcast partnerships with major TV corporations worldwide, with FOX Sports the first to secure one for the United States, Mexico and Central America. ESPN holds the rights across Latin America as part of a multi-language deal, while SPOTV is the exclusive broadcaster in fourteen Asian countries. Other partners include Sony Pictures Networks in India, ITV in Great Britain, Mediaset in Italy, Ziggo Sport in the Netherlands and Eurosport in more than 50 territories across Europe. Additionally, DAZN announced global free-to-air coverage of the series in October 2025.

== See also ==
- Extreme E
