= Maxime Nocher =

French kitesurfer

- Born: 6 February 1994 (age 32)
- Occupation: Professional kite surfer

Maxime Nocher (born 2 June 1994) is a French professional kite surfer.

Nocher is a 10 time world champion and nine time French champion.

== Achievements ==
2006
(silver) Vice-champion d’Europe junior en freestyle

2007
(gold) Champion d’Europe junior freestyle

2008
(gold) 1er en coupe d’Europe course racing

2009
4ème au championnat de France freestyle
(gold) 1 er en coupe d’europe course racing
(silver) vice-champion de France course racing
(gold) 1er au Hyères kite-show

2010
(gold) Champion de France junior course racing
(gold) 1er coupe d’europe course racing
(gold) Champion de France junior freestyle

2011
(gold) Champion du Monde junior racing
(gold) Champion de France junior Course racing.
(silver) Vice Champion du Monde en planche de série.
(silver) Vice Champion Europe tour course racing.

2012
(gold) Champion du Monde de foil.
(silver) Vice Champion du Monde de slalom.
5ème Mondiale.
(silver) Vice Champion Europe tour course racing.
(gold) Champion de France de race
(gold) Coupe d'Europe race

2013
(gold) Champion de France race
(gold) Champion de France longue distance
(gold) Champion du Monde de foil
(gold) Coupe d'Europe de Race
(gold) Recordman de la traversée saint Barth-Saint Martin à la voile.

2014
(gold) Champion du Monde race -21 ans
(gold) Champion du Monde race toutes catégories
(gold) Champion de France race
(gold) Champion de France longue distance
(silver) Vice champion de France foil
(silver) Vice Champion de la Coupe du Monde de race
(gold) Recordman de la traversée du Bosfor Turquie à la voile.

2015
(gold) Champion du Monde race toutes catégories
(gold) Champion du Monde Foil
(gold) Champion de France race
(silver) Vice champion de France foil

2016
(gold) Recordman de la traversée Continent-Corse à la voile.
