= Spark Odyssey 21 =

Electric off-road rally car

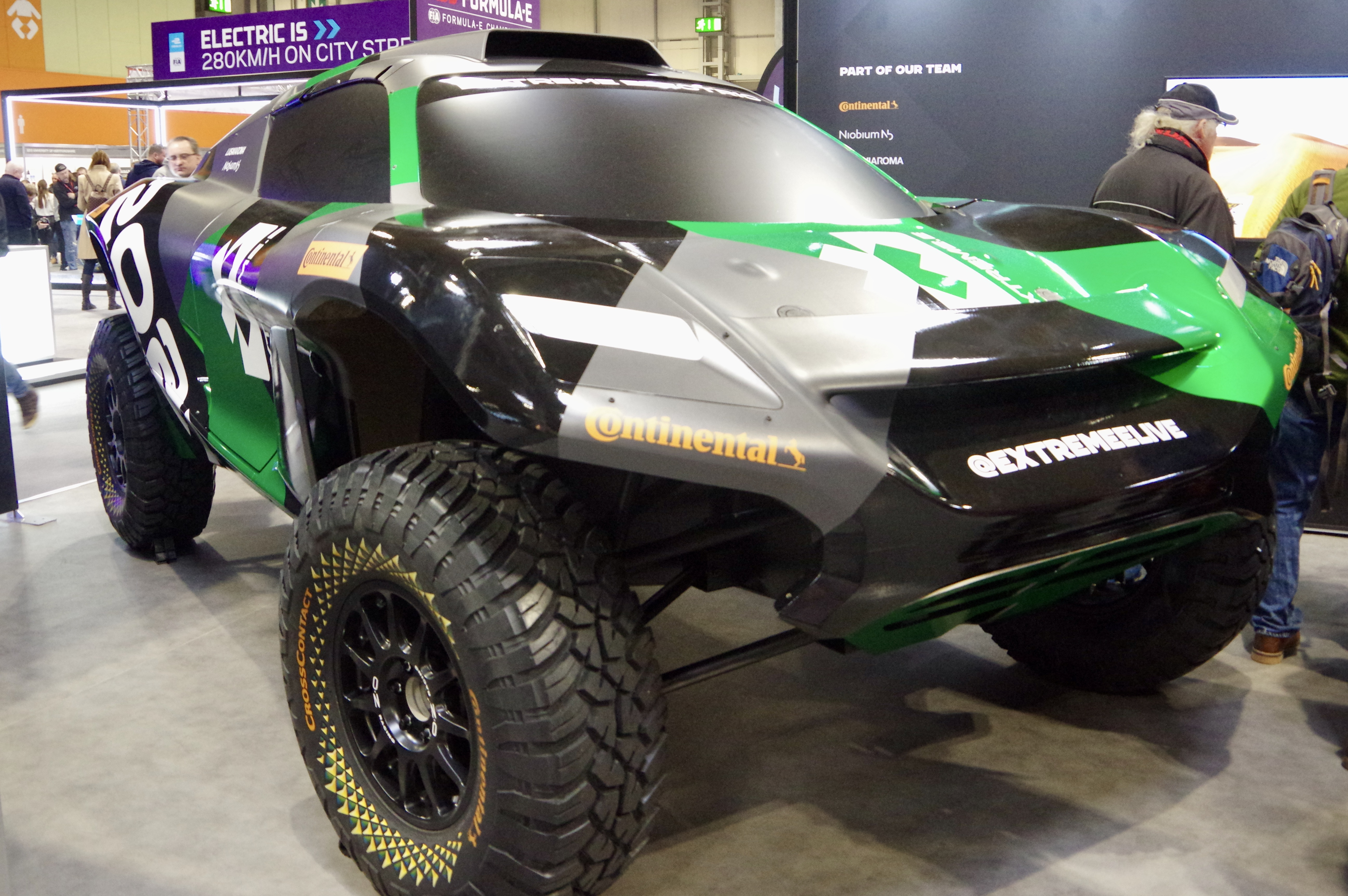
- Category: Extreme E
- Constructor: Spark Racing Technology
- Designer: Théophile Gouzin (Technical Director)
- Successor: Pioneer 25

Technical specifications
- Chassis: Tubular frame made of niobium reinforced steel alloy
- Suspension: Double wishbone with three-way adjustable mono-damper. Hydraulic bump and rebound stop
- Length: 4401 mm
- Width: 2300 mm
- Height: 1864 mm
- Axle track: Front & Rear: 1998 mm
- Wheelbase: 3001 mm
- Electric motor: Various mid-mounted
- Transmission: Various
- Battery: 54 kWh Williams Advanced Engineering
- Power: 400 kW (536 bhp)
- Weight: 1650 kg
- Brakes: Six-piston Alcon calipers. Iron disk and pads
- Tyres: Continental Cross Contact

Competition history
- Competition: Extreme E
- Debut: 2021 Desert X-Prix

The Spark Odyssey 21, stylized as ODYSSEY 21, is an electric off-road racecar designed by Spark Racing Technology for the Extreme E championship.

== Development and promotion ==
It was first announced in August 2018, that Formula E would operate a new "Extreme E" electric SUV series, that would race through challenging locations and terrain such as the Himalayas and the Arctic regions, and was first presented to manufacturers as a spec-series with limited areas for open development, including motors and bodywork, although the base chassis would be a set specification, and the cars were to be silhouettes of roadgoing SUV models.

On 1 February 2019, it was announced by the series that the cars would use technology developed for the Formula E Championship, with the specifications parts being the base chassis, battery, suspension, ECU and software, as well as an FE powertrain motor, with the last being optional. Chassis constructor for Formula E, Spark Racing Technology would also be announced as the builder of the base XE chassis. In the same announcement, it was said that the series would use a customer team approach, with all manufacturers free to sell their powertrains to a maximum of two customers at a capped price.

On April 23, 2019, a clarification was issued, which details Spark Racing Technology's involvement, with Spark building the car's tubular steel frame, crash structure and roll cage, in addition to the suspension and dampers, braking and steering system. The bodykit areas for manufacturers were also defined as the engine cover, side skirt, lights and front and rear bumpers.

On July 5, 2019, at the Goodwood Festival of Speed, Extreme E took the covers off the car, revealing its name as the ODYSSEY 21, with a niobium-reinforced steel alloy tubular frame, a crash structure and roll cage, while tyres for both winter and summer conditions would be supplied by founding partner Continental. On the same day, following the public reveal, Spark Racing Technologies technical director Théophile Gouzin revealed that the car was to undergo visits to a number of World Rally Championship and Dakar Rally proving grounds, such as Château de Lastours, following September, in preparation for the 2021 debut. During the weekend, the car also ran demonstration runs up the Goodwood hillclimb circuit, powered by the motor from the Spark-Renault SRT 01E.

The vehicle was showcased in action during the 2020 Dakar Rally in Saudi Arabia in January 2020. Guerlain Chicherit drove the vehicle during shakedown one day before the race start. Ken Block raced it on final stage 12 between Haradh and Al-Qiddiya as a guest by the invitation of the organizers A.S.O.
