= Justina Kitchen =

New Zealand Olympic kitefoiler

Personal information
- Born: 11 April 1989 (age 37) Nelson, New Zealand
- Height: 169 cm (5 ft 7 in)

Sailing career
- Sport: Sailing
- Club: Takapuna Boating Club
- Class: Formula Kite
Medal record
Formula Kite European Championships
Bronze medal – third place	2019 Torregrande	Formula Kite Relay, Mixed

Justina Kitchen (born 11 April 1989) is a New Zealand Olympic kitefoiler.

== Life ==
Kitchen's father Rex Sellers competed in sailing at four Olympics and he gained a gold and a silver medal before she was born in 1989. Kitchen's ambition was to compete at the Olympics in 2012 as a windsurfer but she was not chosen.

In 2018 she was completing her degree when her husband showed her the new sport of kitefoiling. At the 2019 European Championships she was fifth. She took up the sport believing that she would be able to compete in 2016 at the Rio Olympics. It was announced that kitefoiling would be introduced, however Kitchen's ambitions were thwarted when it was decided that kitefoiling would not be included.

Kitchen switched to kitefoiling, a sport where the rider controls a power kite and the surboard can rise out of the water on a hydrofoil. The riders travel virtually splash- and noise- free at speeds of up to 48 kilometres per hour (30 mph). The sport is not without risks and apart from a crash helmet the riders are obliged to wear an impact vest and to carry a hooked knife.

Kitefoiling became an Olympic sport in the planning for the 2024 Paris Olympics. 40 athletes were to compete, and half of them would be women. In the September before the Olympics, Kitchen suffered a large injury to her anterior cruciate ligament. The board that she was using landed heavily on her leg bending it backwards. She was training with others and the Australian kitefoiler Breiana Whitehead came to her aid as Kitchen could not swim with her injury. Kitchen was upset because she thought this was, again, the end of her Olympic ambitions. A knee injury like this can demand the end of a career or invasive surgery; Kitchen opted for neither but decided to use physiotherapy to recover. Kitchen was able to reserve a place as the representative of Oceania. The places to join the first Olympic Formula Foil competition at the 2024 Olympics were highly valued. The "last chance" contest (French Olympic Week) was held in Hyères in April 2024 when the last five Olympic places were the prizes for kitefoilers. By this time the chosen continental competitors included not only Kitchen but Fawn Jantawan from Thailand, Catalina Turienzo from Argentina, the Canadian Emily Claire Bugeja, Julie Paturau from Mauritius and the Spaniard Gisela Pulido.
