= International Kiteboarding Association =

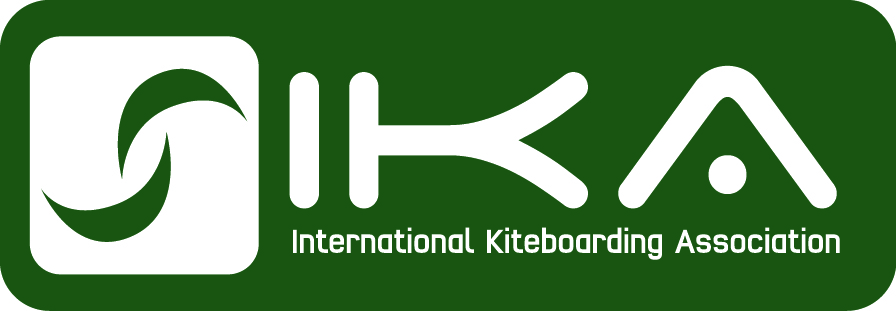
- Abbreviation: IKA
- Formation: 2008
- Type: Sports federation
- Region served: International
- Chairman: Richard Gowers
- Main organ: Executive committee
- Parent organization: International Sailing Federation
- Website: www.kiteclasses.org

The International Kiteboarding Association (IKA), is the only kiteboarding class inside the International Sailing Federation (ISAF). The IKA class rules fall in the category of a development class.

== History ==
The International Kiteboarding Association was founded in April 2008 by Guillaume Fournier (two-time kiteboarding world champion), after the International Sailing Federation (ISAF) had included the principle of surfers being propelled by a kite in the 'ISAF Equipment Rules of Sailing'. Kiteboarding was adopted in November 2008 as an ISAF international sailing class. An Executive Committee is re-appointed by the class AGM. The duties of the Executive Committee are to take care of the day-to-day business of the association, and to coordinate submissions from the sub-committees.

== Executives ==
The Executive Committee is:

- Chairman: Richard Gowers (GBR)
- Vice-chairman: Bruno De Wannemaeker (BEL)
- Executive Secretary: Markus Schwendtner (GER)
- Head of Communications and Public Affairs: Diego Massimiliano De Giorgi (ITA).
- Board members: Mirco Babini (ITA), Olivier Mouragues (FRA), Adam Szymanski (POL) and John Gomes (USA).

== Disciplines ==
There are five disciplines with individual world rankings and world championships.

- Course Racing (comparable to standard sailing regattas)
- Freestyle (where performance is judged on individual expression and difficulty of tricks)
- Kite Cross (riders compete in heats against each other, with the winners advancing to the next round)
- Wave Riding (where performance is judged on wave selection and performance of manoeuvres on the wave)
- Speed (with performance measured by the average speed over a fixed distance, usually 500 m)

== Classes ==
The IKA is responsible for the management of the following World Sailing kiteboarding classes:

- IKA Formula Kite – a high performance hydrofoiling class which has been selected by World Sailing as equipment for the kiteboarding event at the 2024 Summer Olympics.
- IKA KiteFoil
- IKA Open
- IKA TwinTip:Racing
- IKA TwinTip:Freestyle

== Class growth ==
Around 30 national kite class associations are affiliated to the International Kiteboarding Association and active fleets exist in more than 65 countries.

== Championships ==
Class Championships are run as 'one-off' competitions in the racing disciplines course racing, kite cross and speed, and as series of events for the expression disciplines freestyle and wave riding.

== Tours ==
Professional Tour Operators exist that organize series of sanctioned events. These are:

- PKRA: Series of events in freestyle, course racing and wave riding
- KTE: European Freestyle Championship Series, also providing course racing events
- KTA: Asian Freestyle Championship Series, also offering disciplines like Old School and Twin Tip Racing
- KSP: Series of events in wave riding

== Champions ==
=== Freestyle ===
- 2021: Arthur Guillebert (FRA) & Mikaili Sol (BRA)
- 2019: Valentin Rodriguez (COL) & Mikaili Sol (BRA)
- 2018: Carlos Mario (BRA) & Mikaili Sol (BRA)
- 2015: Liam Whaley (ES) & Gisela Pulido (ES)
- 2014: Christophe Tack (BE) & Karolina Winkowska (POL)
- 2013: Alex Pastor (ES) & Gisela Pulido (ES)
- 2012: Youri Zoon (NED) & Karolina Winkowska (POL)
- 2011: Youri Zoon (NED) & Gisela Pulido (ES)
- 2010: Andy Yates (AUS) and Gisela Pulido (ES)
- 2009: Kevin Langeree (NED) and Bruna Kayija (BRA)
- 2008: Aaron Hadlow (UK) & Gisela Pulido (ES)
- 2007: Aaron Hadlow (UK) & Gisela Pulido (ES)
- 2006: Aaron Hadlow (UK)
- 2005: Aaron Hadlow (UK)
- 2005: Aaron Hadlow (UK)

=== Course racing ===
- 2013: Florian Gruber and Erika Heineken (USA)
- 2012: John Heineken(USA) and Erika Heineken (USA)
- 2011: John Heineken (USA)and Steph Bridge (GBR)
- 2010: Adam Koch (USA) and Kari Schibevaag (NOR)
- 2009: Sean Farley (MEX) and Steph Bridge (GBR)

=== Speed ===
- 2009 : Alexandre Caizergues (FRA) and Melissa Gil (PUE)

=== Wave riding ===
- 2012: Keahi De Aboitiz (AUS) and Jalou Langeree (NED)
- 2011: Airton Cozzolino (ITA) and Ines Correia (POR)
- 2010: Guilly Brandao (BRA) and Gisela Pulido (ESP)
- 2009: Jan Marcos Rivieras (DOM) and Kari Schibevaag (NOR)
- 2008: Mitu Monteiro (CV)

== Records ==
French kiteboarder Sebastien Cattelan became the first sailor to break the 50 knots barrier by reaching 50.26 knots on 3 October 2008 at the Lüderitz Speed Challenge in Namibia. Earlier in the event, on 19 September, American Rob Douglas reached 49.84 knots (92.30 km/h), becoming the first kitesurfer to establish an outright world record in speed sailing. Previously the record was held only by sailboats or windsurfers.

The outright sailing speed record has since been claimed by the French trimaran Hydroptère which, on 4 September 2009, reached a speed of 51.36 knots over 500 meters and 50.17 over a nautical mile in open ocean and only 25 to 30 knots of wind.

In October 2010, Rob Douglas became the outright speed world record holder on water powered by the wind with 55.65 knots, exceeding the previous record by more than four knots.
