= Katja Roose =

Dutch kitesurfer

- Born: 27 March 1981 (age 44)
- Occupation: Professional kite surfer

Katja Roose (born 27 March 1981) is a Dutch female professional kite surfer.

== Biography ==
=== Early life ===
Playing with wind and water is something Roose grew up with. Her parents took her out sailing when she was just three weeks old. At her first body drag experience in 2001 she was hooked from the start. When she started competing, she wasn't ambitious at all and was already happy to be performing. Instead of being a "nobody" she seemed to have a talent for the sport. Within a year she had sponsors for her kites, wet suits and other clothing. She won the gold medal in the freestyle kiting competition of the 2003 Dutch Championships and took part in the 2004 King of the Air competition in Ho‘okipa, Hawaii, United States, her first international event, finishing fourth.

=== 2005-2008 ===
In 2005, she competed in her first PKRA World Tour organised by the International Kiteboarding Association. She fully focused on the competition circuit and within three tour events she claimed a top five ranking, which she kept until the end of the 2005 season. At the same time she studied Technology and Policy at the Technical University of Eindhoven. She combined the PKRA World Tour season in 2006 with finishing her Master's degree. After her studies she wanted to combine her professional kite surfing career with a job outside of sports. She took a job offer from KPN, a Dutch telecommunication company and she focused on a new discipline in kite surfing, speed kiting as it is easier to train for in the Netherlands and because it has less competitions during a year. In Lüderitz, Namibia she set a new Dutch women outright speed record, meaning that she is the fastest Dutch women powered by wind on the water. With 39.56 knots (=73.3 km/h) average over 500 meters she is faster than windsurfers, kite surfers and sailors.

=== 2009–present ===
After two years of freestyle and two years of speed kiting it was time to focus on yet another new discipline. Course racing was a fast-growing discipline and has the opportunity to become an Olympic sport in the future. She had always liked to combine speed, tactics and upwind skills, but the opportunity to overtake opponents and to aim to keep them behind got her really excited. In 2011, she wanted to completely focus on her kite surfing and she decided to take a four-month sabbatical. This paid off in a successive way as she won plenty of competitions including European Championships, North American Championships and PKRA World Tour Championships. She finished 2011 as the number one in the World rankings. In 2012, she won her first World title at the slalom discipline, finishing in front of Caroline Adrien and Kristin Boese.

In 2013 Roose was on Pingtan Island in China where record breaking prize money and free accommodation had brought in 120 international competitors for the KTA final including local poster girl Chen Jingyue. Roose, the Thai Kitefoiler Fawn Jantawan and Kathrin Borgwardt made difficult competition throughout the week but Roose beat them.

== Achievements ==
2003
(gold) (Netherlands) National Championships (freestyle)
2004
4th King of the Air, Ho‘okipa (freestyle)
2005
4th PKRA World Tour Brazil
5th overall PKRA World Tour (freestyle)
2006
(silver) PKRA World Cup (kite cross)
8th overall PKRA World Tour (freestyle)
2007
1st (Netherlands) National Championships (speed kiting)^
3rd overall PKRA World Tour (speed kiting)
2008
(silver) (Netherlands) National Championships (speed kiting)
(bronze) European Championships (speed kiting)
(bronze) PKRA World Tour Port Saint Louis (speed kiting)
(bronze) PKRA World Tour Fuerteventura (speed kiting)
(bronze) Speed Challenge Lüderitz (speed kiting)
3rd overall PKRA World Tour (speed kiting)
2009
(gold) Open Belgium Championships (course racing)
5th World Championships (course racing)
4th European Championships (course racing)
4th Kite Masters (course racing)

2010
5th World Championships (course racing)
(silver) PKRA World Tour Fuerteventura (course racing)
(gold) Open Belgium Championships (course racing)
4th PKRA World Tour Sankt Peter-Ording (course racing)
(gold) Overall Kitesurf Tour Europe (course racing)
(gold) European Championships (course racing)
2011
(gold) Open Belgium Championships (course racing)
(silver) PKRA World Tour Thailand (course racing)
(gold) Open North American Championships (course racing)
(gold) PKRA World Tour Sankt Peter-Ording (course racing)
1st (Netherlands) National Championships (course racing)^
(gold) Kitesurf Tour Europe Italy (course racing)
(gold) Kitesurf Tour Europe France (course racing)
(gold) Overall Kitesurf Tour Europe (course racing)
(silver) World Championships (course racing)
(gold) European Championships (course racing)
2012
(gold) PKRA World Tour Mexico (course racing)
(gold) PKRA World Tour Den Haag, Scheveningen (course racing)
(silver) PKRA World Tour Hyères (course racing)
(gold) World Championships Westerland, Germany (slalom)

^ = unofficial
