= Ariane Imbert =

French kitefoiler

- Born: c. 1979
- Occupation: National coach (Formula Kite)
- Known for: French champion five times

Ariane Imbert (born c. 1979) is a kite foiler who was the French champion five times and on two occasions nearly the world champion. She became the French national coach.

== Life ==
Imbert was brought up in a sailing family in Nice. Her mother was a windsurfer and her father raced and had a houseboat in the port of Nice. She started to sail on an Optimist dinghy and progressed to a Laser dinghy. Even in Nice she could surf and windsurf.

Imbert became a parent and a kiter and when the relationship ended she and her son moved to Hyeres. In 2008 after taking training in using a kite she opened a school of kiting. Kiting gained more recognition and in 2011 her school was identified as a regional centre for learning the sport (Regional Center of Sporting Excellence Hyérois). She began to compete and was French champion five times and on two occasions nearly the world champion.

When the International Sailing Federation identified Formula Kite in 2018 as a sport for the 2024 Olympics she was in a key position as the French coach.

In about 2017 Lauriane Nolot joined Imbert's training school at Hyères with some experience of kitefoiling. She was 19 years old and studying for a master's degree in digital creation.

As the Olympics approached, French athletes did well in international competitions. In the 2024 European Championship France took the top three positions with the Gold going to her student Lauriane Nolot. Nolot, Poema Newland, and Jessie Kampman also did well at the 2024 World Championship, where they took three of the top four places. Imbert was credited with being a source of the nations leading position in the sport. France has two Olympics competitors, Lauriane Nolot and Axel Mazella, in Formula Kite as the host nation of the 2024 Games and both of them are students of Imbert.
