= Benyapa Jantawan =

Thai Olympic kite foiler

Personal information
- Nickname: Fawn
- Born: 10 April 1984 (age 42) Nan province, Thailand
- Height: 1.60 m (5 ft 3 in)

Sailing career
- Sport: Sailing
- Class: IKA - Formula Kite
Medal record
Women's kite surfing
Representing Thailand
Asian Games
| Silver medal – second place | 2022 Hangzhou | Women's Kite |

Benyapa "Fawn" Jantawan (born 10 April 1984) is a real estate agent and an Olympic kite surfer from Thailand. She was the silver medallist at the 19th Asian Games in 2023.

== Life ==
Jantawan was born in 1984 and she took up kiteboarding in about 2008. She started with a three-day course and she built up more experience in her spare time. The Professional Kiteboard Riders Association ran an event at her local beach and she decided to enter to find out more about the competition. Later she was the first woman to travel across the Gulf of Thailand from the city of Pattaya back to Hua Hin on a kitefoil.

In 2013, she was on Pingtan Island in China where record breaking prize money and free accommodation had brought in 120 international competitors for the KTA final including local poster girl Chen Jingyue and the Dutch kitefoiler Katja Roose who gave Jantawan and Kathrin Borgwardt difficult competition throughout the week.

In 2017, she was sixth at the World Formula Kite Championships that took place in Muscat in Oman.

Jantawan competed in September 2023 in the postponed 19th Asian Games at Pingtan Island and she took the silver medal. The Games began with the kite competitions at the Ningbo Xiangshan Sailing Centre. The Chinese contestant Jingyue Chen won the event becoming the Asian champion and the bronze medal was gained by Lee Young-eun of South Korea. She will be competing again with Chen in Paris in August 2024 as they were both chosen to be Olympic contestants.

The last chance contest (French Olympic Week) was held in Hyères in April 2024 when the last five Olympic places were the prizes. By this time Juntawari was already in the chosen continental competitors which included Gisela Pulido from Spain, Catalina Turienzo, the Canadian Emily Claire Bugeja, Julie Paturau from Mauritius and Justina Kitchen from New Zealand.
