= 2025 Youth Sailing World Championships – Girl's ILCA 6 =

Girl's ILCA 6 at the 2025 Youth Sailing World Championships
- Venue: Vilamoura, Portugal
- Dates: 12–20 December 2025
- Competitors: 49 from 49 nations

Medalists
gold medal	Irene de Tomás	Spain
silver medal	Hanna Rogowska	Poland
bronze medal	Mirja Dohle	Germany

The girl's ILCA 6 competition at the 2025 Youth Sailing World Championships took place between December 12 and 20, 2025. 49 sailors from 49 nations were due to compete in the event which was won by Spain's Irene de Tomás.

== Results ==
Pos	Helm	Country	R1	R2	R3	R4	R5	R6	R7	R8	R9	Total	Nett
1	Irene de Tomás	Spain	6	1	6	2	5	(29)	13	13	4	79	50
2	Hanna Rogowska	Poland	8	4	7	7	(50 UFD)	17	1	12	8	114	64
3	Mirja Dohle	Germany	3	2	13	3	20	(31)	4	7	23	106	75
4	Beata Dokoupilova	Czech Republic	17	20	11	8	(21)	2	7	1	13	100	79
5	Alina Shapovalova	Ukraine	12	18	1	5	2	23	(29)	19	1	110	81
6	Marina Murri	Italy	1	5	9	(23)	11	22	6	16	11	104	81
7	Léa Bourhis	France	18	8	3	(26)	12	11	24	3	9	114	88
8	Valentina Guimaraes	Brazil	26	6	(50 DNF)	16	13	1	12	11	6	141	91
9	Lena Snauwarrt	Belgium	4	(28)	28	13	1	13	16	4	14	121	93
10	Hieke Schraffordt	Netherlands	(28)	10	22	11	8	20	2	6	16	123	95
11	Sienna Wright	Ireland	25	3	20	1	4	7	10	(50 DSQ)	26	146	96
12	Delfina Kuttel	Argentina	24	11	5	10	6	(25)	11	9	25	126	101
13	Maria Wanzeller	Portugal	27	9	10	4	10	10	(34)	17	29	150	116
14	Sara Lacko	Hungary	21	23	15	(34)	3	4	5	14	32	151	117
15	Isabella Suazo	Peru	11	31	17	24	23	(32)	3	10	5	156	124
16	Katrina Micallef	Malta	7	17	18	22	(25)	16	21	5	18	149	124
17	Ema Kuodytė	Lithuania	23	14	12	25	14	9	(41)	31	3	172	131
18	Chloe Turner	New Zealand	13	15	2	19	16	(42)	35	21	15	178	136
19	Elizaveta Chekhlataia	(Individual Neutral Athletes) Individual Neutral Athlete	9	(26)	26	6	19	18	20	24	21	169	143
20	Caterina Meyer	Australia	2	12	19	20	(50) UFD	30	8	38	17	196	146
21	Iiris Sepponen	Finland	5	21	14	(35)	22	8	19	29	35	188	153
22	Hanna Marie Tvete	Norway	38	7	16	18	15	15	(40)	30	28 STP	207	167
23	Eliza Denning	Bahamas	(33)	13	33	32	26	6	17	22	20	202	169
24	Nana Funazawa	Japan	31	25	25	12	32	28	(44)	8	10	215	171
25	Marina Escudero Negron	Puerto Rico	(43)	22	8	14	33	26	27	35	7	215	172
26	Gaya Datiashivli	Israel	16	(50) UFD	4	9	29	50 DSQ	32	32	2	224	174
27	Asya Sakakli	Turkey	39	35	(50 DNF)	27	7	12	15	2	42	229	179
28	Stina Westberg	Sweden	29	30	30	17	17	19	(38)	15	37	232	194
29	Louise Martin	United States	15	(50 DNF)	(50 DNF)	15	50 UFD	3	9	27	28	247	197
30	Camille Vallotton	Switzerland	22	16	31	29	36	(39)	26	20	19	238	199
31	Tatiani Bougatioti	Greece	19	32	21	(39)	28	35	14	18	36	242	203
32	Camila Ernst	Chile	14	27	32	21	27	34	37	(41)	12	245	204
33	Jessica Powell	United Kingdom	32	19	24	28	24	(38)	33	28	24	250	212
34	Ciara Murphy	Cayman Islands	31 STP	29	29	33	(50) UFD	14	25	23	39	273	223
35	Maya Wolf	Canada	40	33	(50 DNF)	31	45	5	22	33	22	281	231
36	Antea Alujevic	Croatia	35	24	27	30	9	50 DNE	30	(37)	30	272	235
37	Astrid Elnegaard	Denmark	34	34	(50 DNF)	38	30	21	28	34	34	303	253
38	Lucía Köster	Uruguay	20	(50 DNF)	50 DNF	46	37	36	18	25	41	323	273
39	Sarah Yong	Singapore	10	(50 DNF)	50 DNF	43	38	43	23	26	44	327	277
40	Karmel Elis Purje	Estonia	37	37	(50 DNF)	37	43	27	31	42	33	337	287
41	Louise Debeaumont	Monaco	36	(50 DNF)	50 DNF	41	18	41	45	43	31	355	305
42	Cristina Iglesias Perez	Mexico	42	(50 DNF)	23	42	35	45	39	46	38	360	310
43	Ziyan Huang	Hong Kong	41	(50 DNF)	50 DNF	40	41	24	47	45	40	378	328
44	Ana Hurmuzache	Romania	46	(50 DNF)	50 DNF	36	34	37	46	39	45	383	333
45	Akihei Baniel	Tahiti	45	(50 DNF)	50 DNF	47	31	33	47 STP	40	43	386	336
46	Olivia Ryanne Purchase	South Africa	44	36	(50 DNF)	48	39	46	36	44	47	390	340
47	Emily Gaillard	Antigua and Barbuda	47	(50 DNF)	50 DNF	49	44	40	43	36	49	408	358
48	Yejin Park	South Korea	48	(50 DNF)	50 DNF	44	40	44	48	47	48	419	369
49	Scarlett Hadley	Saint Vincent and the Grenadines	49	(50 DNF)	50 DNF	45	42	47	49	48	46	426	376
