= Jesse Richman =

American kitesurfer (born 1992)

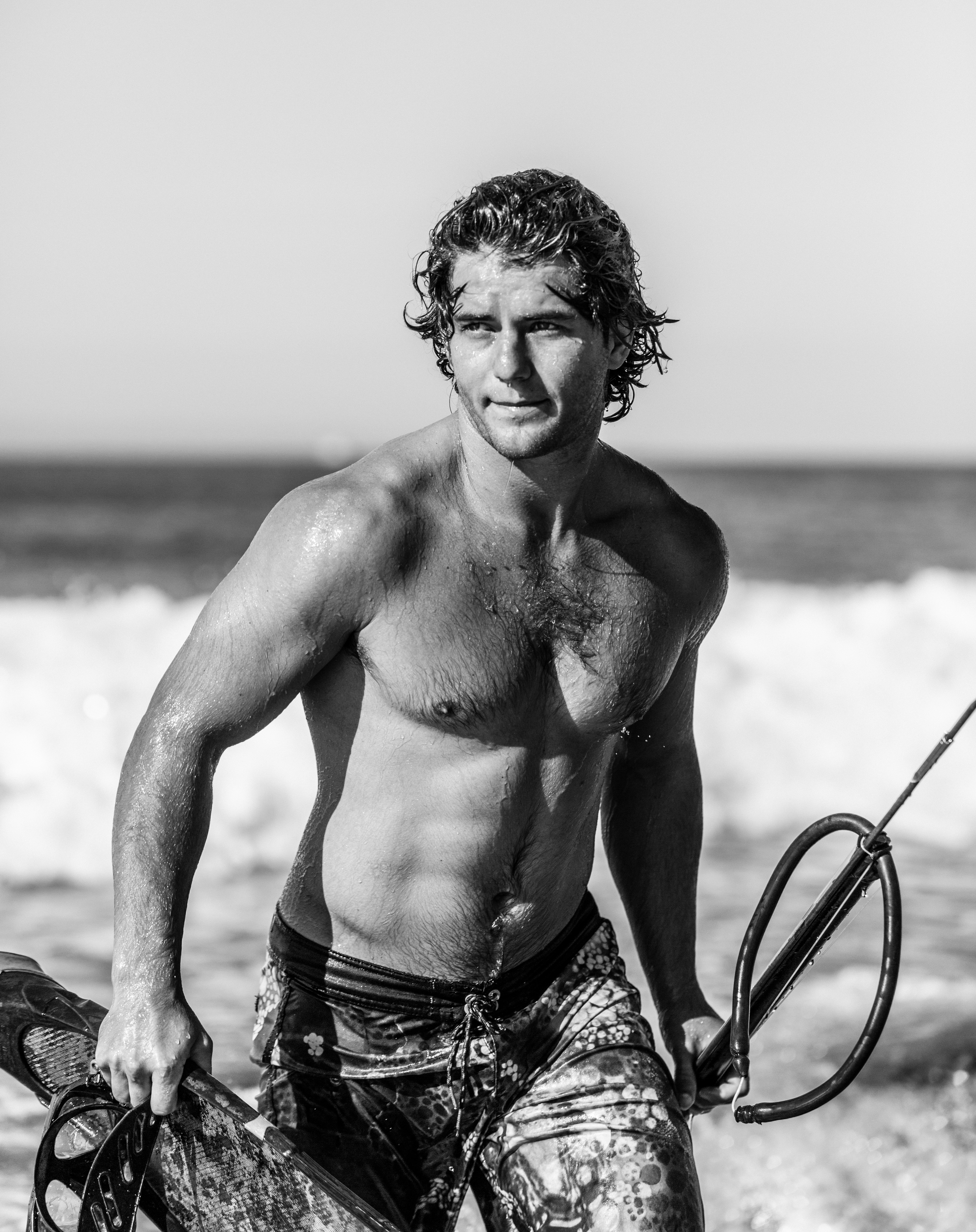

Personal information
- Born: July 22, 1992 (age 34) Haiku, Hawaii
- Website: www.jesserichman.com

Sport
- Sport: Kiteboarding, Kitesurfing

Achievements and titles
- World finals: KPWT World Champion 2008, 2009

Jesse Richman (born July 22, 1992) is a big-wave kitesurfer and a big-air kiteboarder. He is a two-time world champion and the first kitesurfer to get barreled at Jaws. He is also known for his world record 790-foot tow-up and 170-foot jump over land.

== Early life ==
Richman was born on July 22, 1992, in Haiku, Hawaii. He began kiteboarding when he was nine years old with his father and older brother Shawn. He started competing against his brother in events a few years later, including King of the Bay in California, and in 2003 they both signed endorsement deals with Naish Kiteboarding. At the age of 14, he transferred into an online school so that he could travel for world tour kiteboarding events. In 2008, he became the Kiteboard Pro World Tour (KPWT) World Champion, and the following year earned the title of International Kiteboarding Association (IKA) Overall Kitesurfing World Champion.

== Career ==
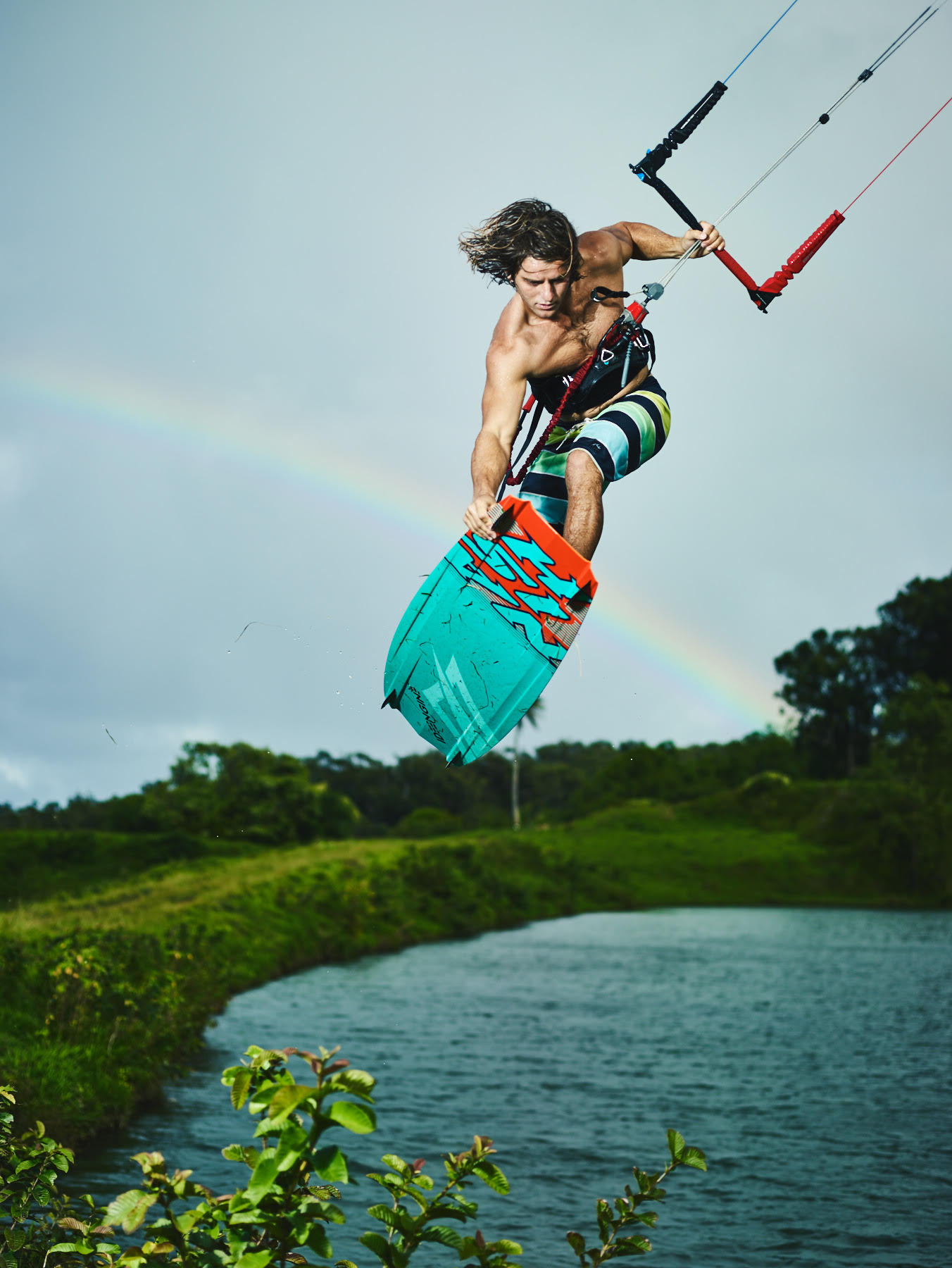
Jesse Richman kiteboarding

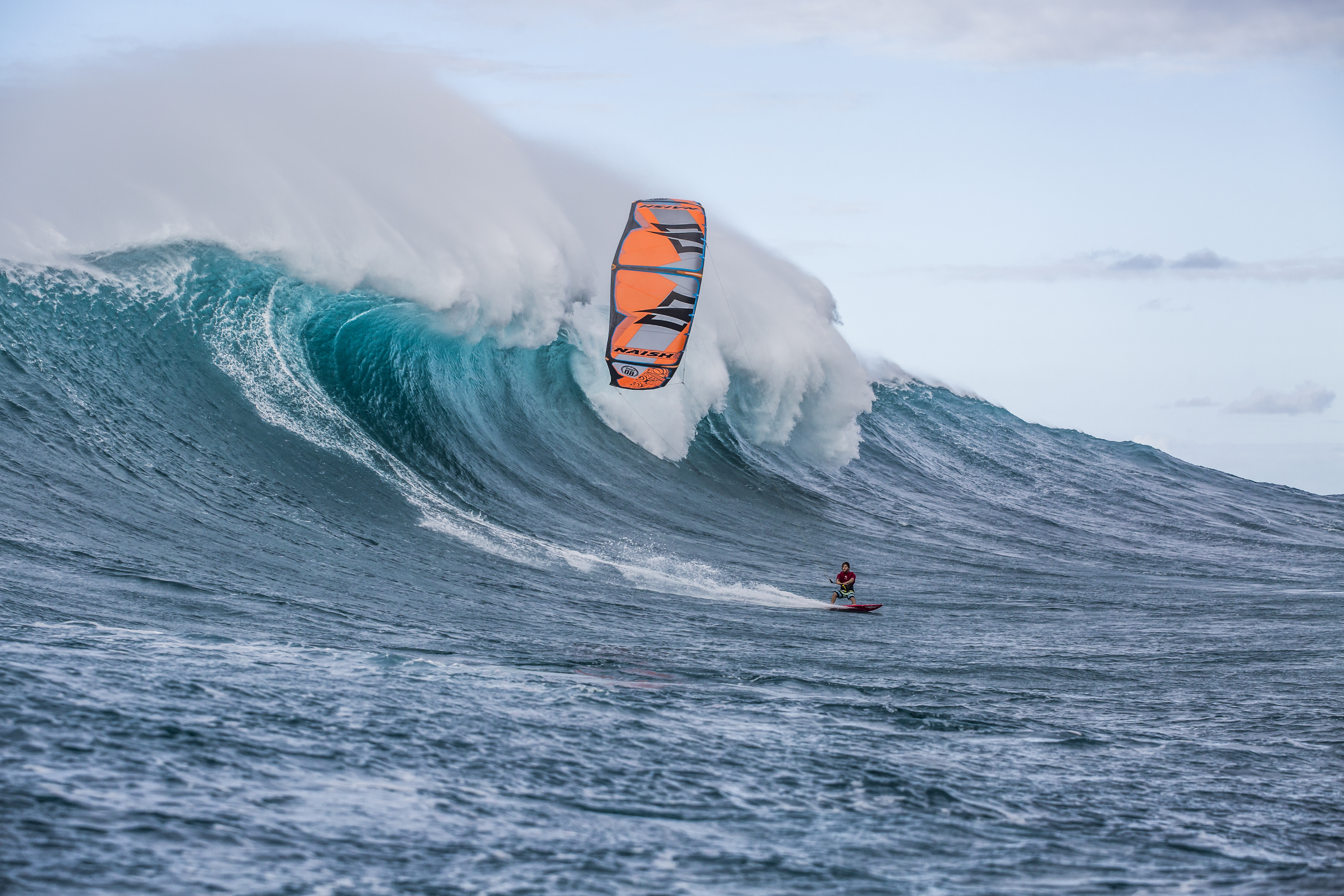
Jesse Richman big wave riding - photo by Pierre Bouras

After being crowned back-to-back World Champion, Richman joined the Naish International Kiteboarding Team in 2011. He stopped competing full-time the same year, to turn his focus to big wave riding at Jaws. Despite the change in focus, he went on to win back-to-back AWSI Kiteboarder of the Year awards from 2012 to 2013, as well as the 2013 Red Bull King of the Air competition.

Richman then got involved with MaiTai Global, a non-profit organization founded by pro-kiteboarder Susi Mai and entrepreneur-investor Bill Tai comprising entrepreneurs, innovators, and athletes focused on giving back to the environment, where has fulfilled roles as a kiteboarding instructor as well as a speaker. He has also participated in the Ocean Gala, a collaborative fundraising event between MaiTai and the Ocean Elders to raise money to expand protected ocean areas.

=== Record jump ===
Richman attempted a world-record tow-up on July 26, 2013, on the Columbia River in Oregon. Richman was towed behind a wakeboard boat, allowing his kite to take him to previously unreached heights. He released the rope and used his kite to safely sail down to the river 790 feet below.

=== Kite the Reef ===
In August 2015, Richman and a team of six other kiteboarders attempted a world record run for the longest kiteboarding journey along the northern section of Australia's Great Barrier Reef. The goal was to raise funds and awareness for motor neuron disease, as well as highlight the importance of the reef's conservation. The team completed the run in eight days on 21 August, after kiting 1237 km from Vlasoff Reef to Cape York and raising over $125,000 for MND Research Centre at Macquarie University.

== Competition results ==
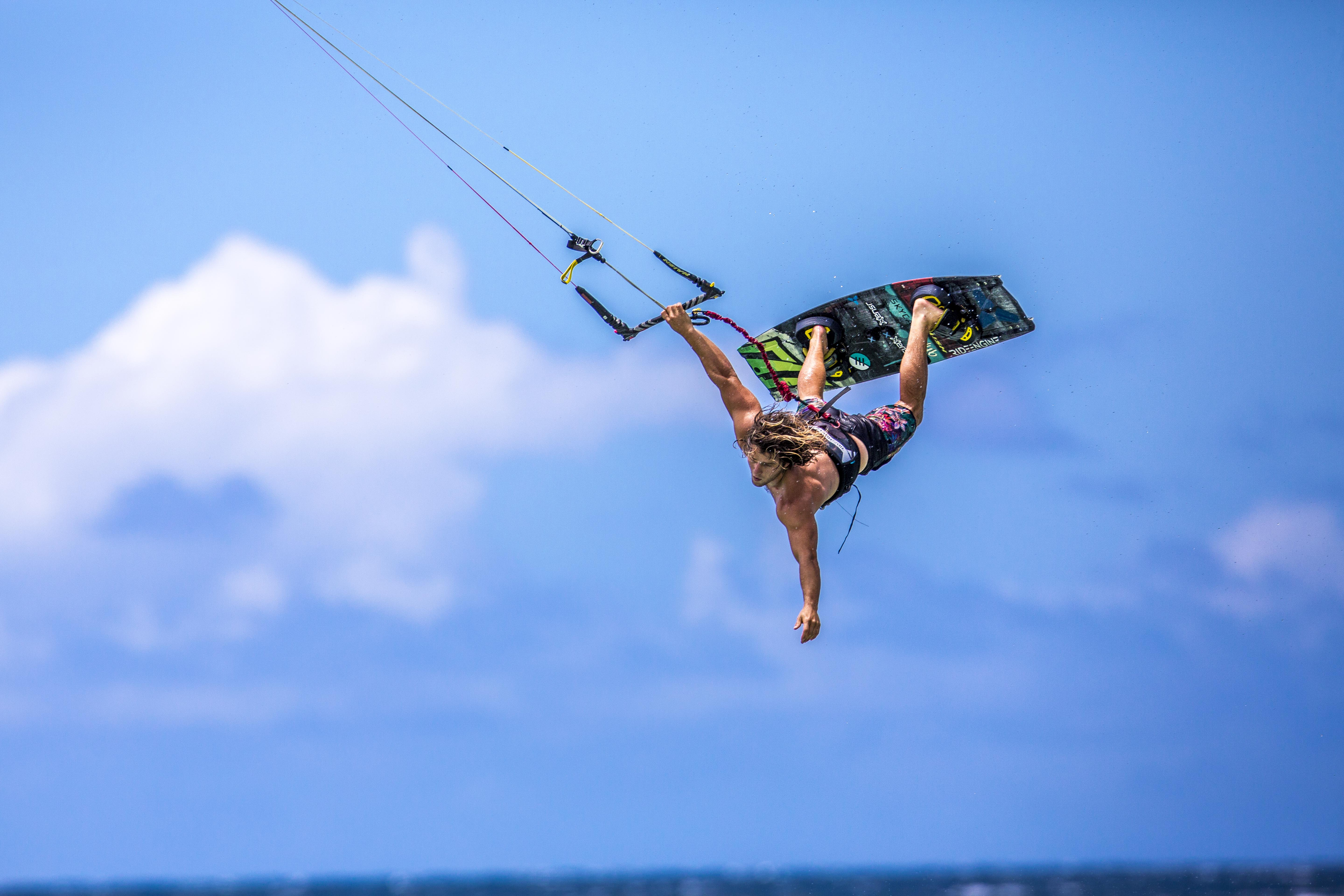
Jesse Richman big air kiteboarding - photo by Jimmie Hepp

=== 2020 ===
- 1st place, Red Bull King of the Air

=== 2016 ===
- AWSI Kiteboarder of the Year
- 2nd place, Red Bull King of the Air

=== 2015 ===
- 4th place, Red Bull King of the Air
- 3rd place, Big Air Virgin Kitesurf World Tour Morocco

=== 2014 ===
- 5th place, Red Bull King of the Air

=== 2013 ===
- 1st place, Red Bull King of the Air
- 2013 AWSI Kiteboarder of the Year

=== 2012 ===
- AWSI Kiteboarder of the Year

=== 2011 ===
- 4th place, Mauritius Kitesurf Pro Tour

=== 2009 ===
- Kiteboard Pro World Tour: 1st Overall World Champion

=== 2008 ===
- Kiteboard Pro World Tour: 1st Overall World Champion

=== 2007 ===
- 3rd place, US Nationals Course Racing
- 1st place, US Nationals Course Racing Juniors

=== 2006 ===
- 2nd place, Velocity Games Corpus Christy Texas

== Filmography ==
- Don't Crack Under Pressure Part 2 (2016)
- Chapter One: The Kiteboard Legacy Begins (2016)
- Don't Crack Under Pressure (2015)
- Nuit de la Glisse: Addicted to Life (2014)
