= Mark Jacobs =

Mark Jacobs may refer to:

- Mark Jacobs (game designer), former CEO of Mythic Entertainment
- Mark Jacobs (Blue Heelers), character on the Australian television show Blue Heelers

== See also ==
- Marc Jacobs (born 1963), fashion designer
- Marc Jacobs (kiteboarder), New Zealand kitesurfer and kiteboarder
- Mark Jacobson (disambiguation) disambiguation
