= Laureus World Sports Award for Action Sportsperson of the Year =

Annual award

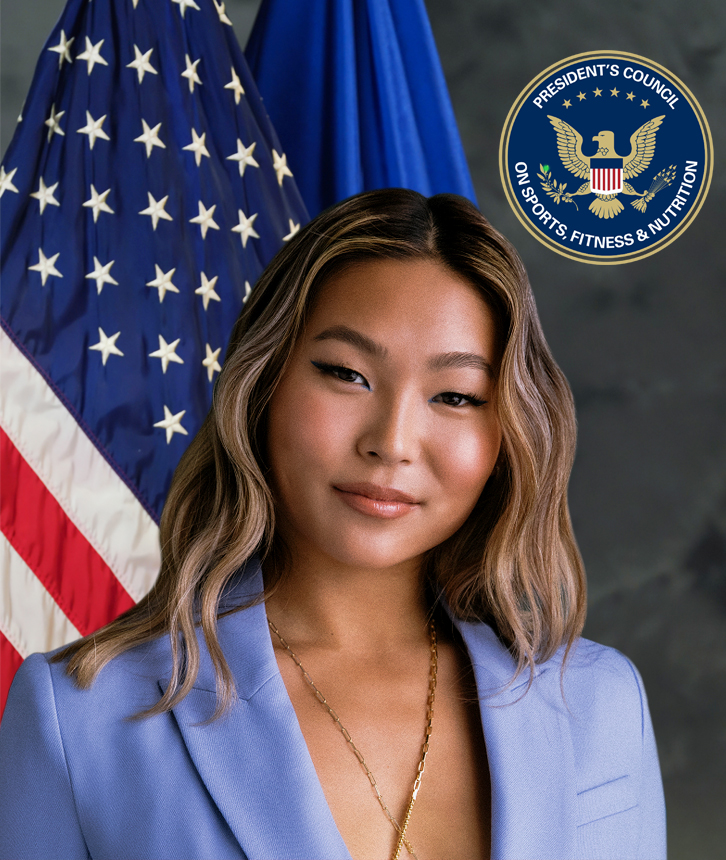
- Chloe Kim, 2025 winner
- Awarded for: "the sportsperson who best demonstrates supreme athletic performance and achievement in action sports."
- Location: Madrid (2026)
- First award: 2000
- Currently held by: (United States) Chloe Kim (2026)

Highlights
- Most awards: (United States) Kelly Slater (4 awards)
- Website: Official website

The Laureus World Sports Award for Action Sportsperson of the Year, known as the Alternative Sportsperson of the Year prior to 2007, is an annual award honouring the achievements of individual athletes from the world of action sports. It was first awarded in 2000 as one of the seven constituent awards presented during the Laureus World Sports Awards. The awards are presented by the Laureus Sport for Good Foundation, a global organisation involved in more than 150 charity projects supporting 500,000 young people. The first ceremony was held on 25 May 2000 in Monte Carlo, at which Nelson Mandela gave the keynote speech. Nominations for the award come from a specialist panel. The Laureus World Sports Academy then selects the winner who is presented with a Laureus statuette, created by Cartier, at an annual awards ceremony held in various locations around the world. The awards are considered highly prestigious and are frequently referred to as the sporting equivalent of "Oscars".

The inaugural winner of the Laureus World Sports Award for Action Sportsperson of the Year, in 2000, was the American multi-sports athlete Shaun Palmer. It has been awarded posthumously on one occasion, in 2006 to the Italian hang glider Angelo d'Arrigo who was killed in an air crash in March of that year. Americans are the most successful with ten awards, while surfers have been recognised most often of any sport with six awards; American surfer Kelly Slater is the individual that has received the award to most times, with four wins. The award has been presented to five women during its history: the Australian surfers Layne Beachley (2004) and Stephanie Gilmore (2010), the British yachtswoman Ellen MacArthur (2005), and the British mountain biker Rachel Atherton (2017), and thrice to the American snowboarder Chloe Kim, who won the award in 2019, 2020 and 2026.

== List of winners and nominees ==
Key
†	Indicates posthumous award

Laureus World Sports Award for Action Sportsperson of the Year winners and nominees
Year	Image	Winner	Nationality	Sport	Nominees	Refs
2000	–	Shaun Palmer	USA	Multi-sport	Tony Hawk (USA) – skateboarding Travis Pastrana (USA) – motorcycling	
2001	Mike Horn	Mike Horn	RSA	Exploration	Layne Beachley (AUS) – surfing Tara Dakides (USA) – snowboarding Davo Karničar (SVN) – climbing/extreme skiing John Stamstad (USA) – mountain biking	
2002	Bob Burnquist	Bob Burnquist	BRA	Skateboarding	Will Gadd (CAN) – ice climbing/paragliding Mat Hoffman (USA) – BMX; Umberto Pelizzari (ITA) – freediving Elena Repko (UKR) – climbing	
2003	Dean Potter	Dean Potter	USA	Climbing	Anne-Caroline Chausson (FRA) – mountain biking/BMX; Kelly Clark (USA) – snowboarding Pierre-Luc Gagnon (CAN) – skateboarding Martin Strel (SVN) – long-distance swimming	
2004	Layne Beachley	Layne Beachley	AUS	Surfing	Gretchen Bleiler (USA) – snowboarding Anne-Caroline Chausson (FRA) – mountain biking/BMX; Laird Hamilton (USA) – surfing Ryan Sheckler (USA) – skateboarding Shaun White (USA) – multi-sport	
2005	Ellen MacArthur	Ellen MacArthur	GBR	Sailing	Darren Berrecloth (CAN) – BMX; Gunn-Rita Dahle (NOR) – mountain biking Dallas Friday (USA) – wakeboarding Mike Horn (RSA) – exploration Shane McConkey (CAN) – freeskiing	
2006		Angelo d'Arrigo†	ITA	Hang gliding	Chelsea Georgeson (AUS) – surfing Tanner Hall (USA) – freeskiing Kelly Slater (USA) – surfing Jeremy Stenberg (USA) – motocross Danny Way (USA) – skateboarding	
2007	Kelly Slater	Kelly Slater	USA	Surfing	Aaron Hadlow (GBR) – kiteboarding Travis Pastrana (USA) – rallying/motorcycling Kevin Pritchard (USA) – windsurfing Gisela Pulido (ESP) – kiteboarding Shaun White (USA) – multi-sport	
2008	Shaun White	Shaun White	USA	Multi-sport	Daniel Dhers (VEN) – BMX; Mick Fanning (AUS) – surfing Stephanie Gilmore (AUS) – surfing Aaron Hadlow (GBR) – kiteboarding Ryan Sheckler (USA) – skateboarding	
2009	Kelly Slater	Kelly Slater	USA	Surfing	Julien Absalon (FRA) – mountain biking Stephanie Gilmore (AUS) – surfing Aaron Hadlow (GBR) – kiteboarding Tanner Hall (USA) – freeskiing Shaun White (USA) – multi-sport	
2010	Stephanie Gilmore	Stephanie Gilmore	AUS	Surfing	Antoine Albeau (FRA) – windsurfing Chris Cole (USA) – skateboarding Mick Fanning (AUS) – surfing Greg Long (USA) – surfing Danny MacAskill (GBR) – mountain bike trials	
2011	Kelly Slater	Kelly Slater	USA	Surfing	Jamie Bestwick (GBR) – BMX; Stephanie Gilmore (AUS) – surfing Levi Sherwood (NZL) – motocross Shaun White (USA) – multi-sport Victor Fernandez (ESP) – windsurfing	
2012	Kelly Slater	Kelly Slater	USA	Surfing	Jamie Bestwick (GBR) – BMX; Philip Köster (GER) – windsurfing Carissa Moore (USA) – surfing Travis Rice (USA) – snowboarding Shaun White (USA) – multi-sport	
2013	Felix Baumgartner	Felix Baumgartner	AUT	Adventure	Jamie Bestwick (GBR) – BMX; Julie Bresset (FRA) – mountain biking Stephanie Gilmore (AUS) – surfing Philip Köster (GER) – windsurfing Joel Parkinson (AUS) – surfing	
2014	–	Jamie Bestwick	GBR	BMX	Bob Burnquist (BRA) – skateboarding Mick Fanning (AUS) – surfing John John Florence (USA) – surfing Maya Gabeira (BRA) – surfing Shaun White (USA) – snowboarding	
2015	Alan Eustace	Alan Eustace	USA	Skydiving	Stephanie Gilmore (AUS) – surfing Nyjah Huston (USA) – skateboarding Sage Kotsenburg (USA) – snowboarding Danny MacAskill (GBR) – mountain bike trials Gabriel Medina (BRA) – surfing	
2016	Jan Frodeno in 2015	Jan Frodeno	GER	Ironman triathlon	Rachel Atherton (GBR) – mountain biking Bob Burnquist (BRA) – skateboarding Adriano De Souza (BRA) – surfing Mick Fanning (AUS) – surfing Chloe Kim (USA) – snowboarding	
2017	Rachel Atherton	Rachel Atherton	GBR	Mountain biking	Pedro Barros (BRA) – skateboarding John John Florence (USA) – surfing Chloe Kim (USA) – snowboarding Kelly Sildaru (EST) – freestyle skiing Tyler Wright (AUS) – surfing	
2018	Armel Le Cleac'h in 2016	Armel Le Cléac'h	FRA	Sailing	John John Florence (USA) – surfing Anna Gasser (AUT) – snowboarding Nyjah Huston (USA) – skateboarding Mark McMorris (CAN) – snowboarding Tyler Wright (AUS) – surfing	
2019	Kim in 2017	Chloe Kim	USA	Snowboarding	Stephanie Gilmore (AUS) – surfing Gabriel Medina (BRA) – surfing Maya Gabeira (BRA) – surfing Shaun White (USA) – multi-sport Anna Gasser (AUT) – snowboarding	
2020	Kim in 2017	Chloe Kim	USA	Snowboarding	Carissa Moore (USA) – surfing Italo Ferreira (BRA) – surfing Mark McMorris (CAN) – snowboarding Nyjah Huston (USA) – skateboarding Rayssa Leal (BRA) – skateboarding	
2021	Not awarded					
2022	–	Beth Shriever	GBR	Cyclist	Italo Ferreira (BRA) – surfing Alberto Ginés (ESP) - climbing Yuto Horigome (JPN) – skateboarding Carissa Moore (USA) – surfing Momiji Nishiya (JPN) – skateboarding	
2023		Eileen Gu	CHN	Skiing	Justine Dupont (FRA) – surfing Stephanie Gilmore (AUS) – surfing Chloe Kim (USA) – snowboarding Rayssa Leal (BRA) – skateboarding Filipe Toledo (BRA) – surfing	
2024		Arisa Trew	AUS	Skateboarding	Rayssa Leal (BRA) – skateboarding Caroline Marks (USA) – surfing Kirsten Neuschäfer (RSA) – sailing Beth Shriever (GBR) – bmx Filipe Toledo (BRA) – surfing	
2025		Tom Pidcock	GBR	mountain biking	Yuto Horigome (JPN) – skateboarding Chloe Kim (USA) – snowboarding Caroline Marks (USA) – surfing Aleksandra Mirosław (POL) – climbing Arisa Trew (AUS) – skateboarding	
2026	Kim in 2017	Chloe Kim	USA	Snowboarding	Yago Dora (BRA) – surfing Kílian Jornet (ESP) – ultra running Rayssa Leal (BRA) – skateboarding Molly Picklum (AUS) – surfing Tom Pidcock (GBR) – mountain biking	

== Statistics ==
Statistics are correct as of 2026 awards.

Winners by nationality
Country	Winners	Nominations
USA	11	45
GBR	5	12
AUS	3	13
BRA	1	17
FRA	1	4
AUT	1	2
RSA	1	2
ITA	1	1
GER	1	0
CHN	1	0
CAN	0	6
JPN	0	3
SVN	0	2
ESP	0	4
EST	0	1
NOR	0	1
NZL	0	1
POL	0	1
UKR	0	1
VEN	0	1
