= Boese =

Boese is a surname. Notable people with the surname include:

- Carl Boese (1887–1958), German film director, screenwriter, and producer
- Kristin Boese (born 1977), German kitesurfer
- Kurt Boese (1929–2021), Canadian wrestler
- Ursula Boese (1928–2016), German opera singer

== See also ==
- Bose (surname)
