= Emily Bugeja =

Canadian kitefoiler

- Born: Emily Claire Bugeja; 30 April 1999 (age 27); North Vancouver
- Education: Queen's University
- Occupations: kite foiler and electrical engineer

Emily Claire Bugeja (born 30 April 1999) is a Canadian kitefoiler who was sixth in the Pan American Games in 2023. She was nominated to compete for Canada at the 2024 Olympics.

== Life ==
Bugeja was born in North Vancouver in 1999. By the age of eight she was beginning her commitment to sailing on an Optimist dinghy. In 2016 she went to New Zealand to sail at the 2016 Youth Worlds. In 2017 she was competing in the 29er class dinghy at the 2017 Canada Games where she won a bronze medal.

Bugeja took up Formula Kite and three years later she was in Santiago in 2023 when she came sixth in the Pan American Games that was held in Chile. She was also the highest placed Canadian at the Trofeo Princesa Sofía regatta. This result meant that Canada had a reserved place for Formula Kite at the 2024 Olympics. Only one athlete is allowed from any one country and Canada's place went to Bugeja as she had scored slightly more highly that her rival kite foiler Marie-Ève Mayrand.

She studied Electrical Engineering in Ontario at Queen's University at Kingston where her interest was in robotics.

The places to join the first Olympic Formula Foil competition at the 2024 Olympics were highly valued. The "last chance" contest (French Olympic Week) was held in Hyères in April 2024 when the last five Olympic places were the prizes for kitefoilers. By this time the chosen competitors representing different continents included not only Bugeja, but Justina Kitchen from New Zealand, Fawn Jantawan from Thailand, Catalina Turienzo from Argentina, Julie Paturau from Mauritius and the Spaniard Gisela Pulido. She was 40th in the overall standings at the 2024 Formula Kite World Championships at Hyères in May 2024. She was chosen to be Canada's athlete joining five others identified for Canada's sailing team over Nataliya Leshko and Martyna Dakowicz. In June 2024, Bugeja was named to Canada's 2024 Olympic team. She competed in the Women's Kite and she was 18th.
