= 2025 Youth Sailing World Championships – Boy's ILCA 6 =

Boy's ILCA 6 at the 2025 Youth Sailing World Championships
- Venue: Vilamoura, Portugal
- Dates: 12–20 December 2025
- Competitors: 57 from 57 nations

Medalists
gold medal	David Coates	United States
silver medal	Jiri Tomes	Czech Republic
bronze medal	Emilios Max Boeros	Cyprus

The boy's ILCA 6 competition at the 2025 Youth Sailing World Championships took place between December 12 and 20, 2025. 49 sailors from 49 nations were due to compete in the event which was won by American David Coates.

== Results ==
	Helm	Country	R1	R2	R3	R4	R5	R6	R7	R8	R9	Total	Nett
1	David Coates	United States	5	13	(37)	1	2	6	1	5	12	82	45
2	Jiri Tomes	Czech Republic	16	5	2	7	25	1	2	2	(58 BFD)	118	60
3	Emilios Max Boeros	Cyprus	4	12	(25)	10	14	3	4	6	10	88	63
4	Levian Büshcher	Germany	11	1	7	15	(41)	15	9	3	11	113	72
5	Tim Lubat	Spain	12	2	21	4	28	(33)	13	16	2	131	98
6	Francisco Dal Ri	Brazil	9	3	3	(58 BFD)	6	31	10	32	4	156	98
7	Healy Ryan	Australia	13	16	13	3	36	4	11	(38)	6	140	102
8	Semen Khashchyna	Ukraine	10	11	15	18	5	12	(21)	20	21	133	112
9	Benedek Héder	Hungary	20	19	(30 STP)	5	16	5	12	14	30	151	121
10	Alessandro Cirinei	Italy	1	4	14	(58 BFD)	19	11	3	13	58 BFD	181	123
11	Floris Schraffordt	Netherlands	21	28	9	2	7	8	14	36	(58 BFD)	183	125
12	Wojciech Wójcik	Poland	14	20	39	(58 BFD)	21	2	18	7	5	184	126
13	Charalampos Velianitis	Hong Kong	2	(36)	28	16	23	24	15	8	14	166	130
14	Mads Wegener	Denmark	6	8	5	17	29	17	27	22	(58 BFD)	189	131
15	Tom Pilkington	New Zealand	18	21	31	18.4 RDG	9	(34)	5	11	18	165.4	131.4
16	Josip Tafra	Croatia	35	15	11	22	1	(58 RET)	7	23	20	192	134
17	Emmanouil Anastasios Vomvylas	Greece	7	25	(58 DNF)	6	11	39	16	12	19	193	135
18	Bobby Driscoll	Ireland	28	17	10	34	20	18	(38)	17	7	189	151
19	Joaquin Galvan	Argentina	(39)	29	16	28	12	19	25	10	15	193	154
20	Elad Dahan	Israel	(58 DSQ)	7	8	31	10	25	43	30	1	213	155
21	Rayene El Haddadi	Morocco	23	24	17	27	8	13	(37)	15	29	193	156
22	Genki Kahara	Japan	3	38	22	(58 BFD)	32	28	8	1	28	218	160
23	Ali Poyraz Ozdemir	Turkey	33	10	4	30	30	20	32	(34)	3	196	162
24	Sergei Efimov	(Individual Neutral Athletes) Individual Neutral Athlete	(45)	6	19	8	4	42	34	40	9	207	162
25	Ethan Chauvry	France	27	27	12	(58 BFD)	3	14	42	29	13	225	167
26	Andrej Bozoki	Serbia	26	18	(58 DNF)	43	22	9	23	24	22	245	187
27	Thomas Cantillon	Belgium	17	(49)	41	33	26	10	17	21	27	241	192
28	Lars Dittel	Switzerland	41	9	18	13	33	26	28	28	(58 BFD)	254	196
29	Marius Graudums	Sweden	8	23	1	9	15	54	(58 DNF)	33	58 BFD	259	201
30	Vicente Guzmán	Peru	(40)	30	23	29	39	7	24	18	32	242	202
31	Alvaro Javier Gutierrez Berrios	Puerto Rico	31	34	33	25	24	27	(35)	25	8	242	207
32	Kenan Tan	Singapore	22	31	35	24	35	32	20	9	(36)	244	208
33	Ole Joss Jacobsen Lepperød	Norway	19	41	24	41	40	(44)	6	4	37	256	212
34	Benjamin Vassallo	Malta	37	32	34	21	27	23	36	(58 DNF)	17	285	227
35	Aaro Rantanen	Finland	50 STP	22	6	14	18	47	(58 DNC)	58 DNC	16	289	231
36	Shanoy Malone	Antigua and Barbuda	44	33	27	11	38	40	19	19	(58 BFD)	289	231
37	José Monteiro	Portugal	36	14	36	12	17	41	33	46	(58 BFD)	293	235
38	Andre Deseau	Canada	24	(40)	38	26	34	16	29	31	39	277	237
39	Jēkabs Čodars	Latvia	15	42	(58 DNF)	19	47	22	22	26	48	299	241
40	Freddie MacLaverty	United Kingdom	38	26	32	32	(42)	21	30	41	26	288	246
41	Norman Cartwright Jr	Bahamas	34	35	(58 DNF)	37	31	30	45	49	23	342	284
42	Rokas Germanavičius	Lithuania	48	(52)	26	20	49	29	48	44	26 STP	342	290
43	Agustin Soto	Chile	25	(46)	40	23	45	37	41	43	41	341	295
44	Pedro Iglesias Perez	Mexico	47	48	(58 DNF)	35	43	35	26	27	35	354	296
45	Haolun Xia	China	32	54	(58 DNF)	40	13	38	46	42	58 BFD	381	323
46	Manoarii Plichart	Tahiti	50	37	20	46	46	50	(55)	55	24	383	328
47	Joaquin Schmidt	Uruguay	43	51	(58 DNF)	39	44	46	40	39	33	393	335
48	Noah Clulow	South Africa	29	57	(58 DNF)	47	51.5	43	31	35	44	395.5	337.5
49	Jun Han	South Korea	52	39	30	45	50	48	(54)	54	31	403	349
50	José Mena	El Salvador	30	45	(58 DNF)	38	56	45	47	52	43	414	356
51	Dylan Menzies	Bermuda	51	43	(58 DNF)	58 BFD	51.5	36	49	37	38	421.5	363.5
52	Kyle D' Juran	Trinidad and Tobago	47 STP	44	(58 DNF)	42	53	51	39	50	45	429	371
53	Raul Ottesson	Estonia	42	50	(58 DNF)	36	57	55	44	48	46	436	378
54	Fermin Hoffmann	Guatemala	55	47	(58 DNF)	48	48	52	53	47	40	448	390
55	Parker Nagle	United States Virgin Islands	54	57 STP	(58 DNF)	58 BFD	37	58 UFD	50	51	34	457	399
56	Kishon Bruno	Grenada	56	53	(58 DNF)	44	55	49	51	53	42	461	403
57	Lyndon Pickering	Cayman Islands	53	55	(58 DNF)	49	54	53	52	45	47	466	408
