= Caroline Adrien =

French kitesurfer

- Born: 23 December 1987 (age 38)
- Occupation: Professional kite surfer

Caroline Adrien (born 23 December 1987) is a French professional kite surfer.

In July 2012 she won the silver medal in the Slalom World Championships, finishing behind Katja Roose, but in front of Kristin Boese. In the same year she took bronze in Cagliari in Italy at the 2012 Kiteboard Course Racing World championships. She was beaten by the British Steph Bridge with the American Erika Heineken taking the gold.

== Achievements ==
2010
(bronze) PKRA World Tour Thailand (cross race)
(silver) PKRA World Tour Sankt Peter-Ording (cross race)
(bronze) PKRA World Tour Fuerteventura (cross race)
(gold) PKRA World Tour Bariloche (cross race)
2011
(bronze) PKRA World Tour Thailand (cross race)
(gold) PKRA World Tour (cross race)
(bronze) PKRA World Tour Sankt Peter-Ording (cross race)
(gold) World Championships (slalom)
2012
(gold) PKRA World Tour Hyères (cross race)
(silver) World Championships (slalom)
