= Julie Paturau =

Mauritian kitefoiler

- Born: December 19, 2000 (age 25)
- Known for: African champion kitefoiler

Julie Paturau (born December 19, 2000) is the Mauritian-born African champion kitefoiler who qualified for the 2024 Summer Olympics.

== Life ==
Patarau was born in about 2001 and her mother was a champion windsurfer who had competed in the Barcelona Olympics. By the aged of nine she was windsurfing inspired by her family.

Patarau took a strong interest in kite foiling in 2021. This was the same year as it was declared an Olympic sport to be staged at the Paris Olympics. In the following year she was placed fifth at the Formula Kite Open Africa-Middle East Championships in Mauritius. French kitefoiler Jessie Kampman won the event, but Patarau's performance was considered important for the evaluation of kitefoiling locally.

At the end of 2023 she competed unopposed at the "African Olympic Qualifier" in Egypt and the African Kite Foil Championships was held in her country. The event was won again by Jessie Kampman, but Patarau was the leading African, and she gained the title of African Champion Kite Foiler and a place in the 2024 Summer Olympics. Jean Lauri Fenouillot who competes in the Men's Formula Foil at the Olympics is also from Mauritius. The Olympics are nominally in Paris, but Paturau's kitefoiling event will take place in Marseilles.

The places to compete at the first Olympic Formula Foil competition at the 2024 Olympics were capped. The "last chance" contest (French Olympic Week) was held in Hyères in April 2024 when the last five Olympic places, were the prizes for kitefoilers. By this time the continental competitors already chosen included Fawn Jantawan from Thailand, Catalina Turienzo from Argentina, the Canadian Emily Claire Bugeja, New Zealander Justina Kitchen, the Spaniard Gisela Pulido and Paturau.
