= Ruben Lenten =

Dutch kitesurfer

Personal information
- Full name: Ruben Lenten
- Nationality: Dutch
- Born: March 30, 1988 (age 38) Noordwijk

Sport
- Country: Netherlands
- Sport: Kitesurfing
- Team: Kitemana

Ruben Lenten (born 30 March 1988) is a Dutch professional kite surfer who has won the Red Bull King of the Air in 2005.

Ruben started kiteboarding at the age of 12 and quickly made a name for himself as a rider who was willing to push the sport hard and take that extra risk out on the water. For a number of years Ruben competed on the PKRA freestyle world tour with a second position overall in 2005 as his best ranking.

Ruben was one of the first riders to try radical high-powered moves in gale force conditions, easily jumping over 15 m high. One of his signature moves has become the megaloop, where the kite is steered around in a tight circle while the rider is up really high in the air. (see photo link below) In recent years Ruben has moved away from the competition scene and focused on other projects like producing kiteboarding movies and creating and organizing new kiteboarding concepts and events like the LEN10 Megaloop challenge. Ruben was instrumental in developing a new competition format that caters more to the public, featuring an easy to follow scoring system and higher and more spectacular jumps. Ruben did take part in the 2014 and 2015 King of the Air competitions in South Africa. He came in third in 2014 but crashed hard in this years final, dislocating his hand in the aftermath.

Together with other accomplished riders like Aaron Hadlow and Robby Naish Ruben is currently working on a project that strives to really put the kiteboarding industry on the map by making the biggest kiteboard movie to date. Ruben has worked with Aaron Hadlow in the past. Together they partnered with RedBull to make a web series called "On the Loose". Ruben is currently sponsored by Kitemana.
