= Sailing at the 2022 Asian Games – Women's Formula Kite =

Women's Formula Kite at the 2022 Asian Games
- Venue: Xiangshan Sailing Centre
- Date: 21–27 September 2023
- Competitors: 4 from 4 nations

Medalists
gold medal	Chen Jingyue	China
silver medal	Benyapa Jantawan	Thailand
bronze medal	Lee Young-eun	South Korea

The women's Formula Kite competition at the 2022 Asian Games was held from 21 to 27 September 2023 at Xiangshan Sailing Centre in Ningbo.

Points were assigned based on the finishing position in each race (1 for first, 2 for second, etc.). The points were totaled from the top 13 results of the first 16 races, with lower totals being better.

== Schedule ==
All times are China Standard Time (UTC+08:00)

Date	Time	Event
Thursday, 21 September 2023	14:00	Race 1–4
Friday, 22 September 2023	11:04	Race 5–8
Saturday, 23 September 2023	14:00	Race 9–12
Sunday, 24 September 2023	11:04	Race 13–14
Monday, 25 September 2023	14:00	Race 15–16
Wednesday, 27 September 2023	12:30	Final

== Results ==
Legend

- DNF — Did not finish
- DNS — Did not start

=== Opening series ===
Rank	Athlete	Race																Total
Rank	Athlete	1	2	3	4	5	6	7	8	9	10	11	12	13	14	15	16	Total
1	Chen Jingyue (CHN)	~~(1)~~	~~(1)~~	1	1	1	1	1	1	1	1	~~(3)~~	1	1	1	1	1	13
2	Benyapa Jantawan (THA)	~~(2)~~	2	2	2	2	~~(3)~~	2	2	2	~~(3)~~	1	2	2	2	2	2	25
3	Lee Young-eun (KOR)	~~(3)~~	~~(3)~~	~~(3)~~	3	3	2	3	3	3	2	2	3	3	3	3	3	36
4	Hou Jia-lin (TPE)	~~(4)~~	4	4	4	4	4	4	4	~~(5)~~; DNF	4	4	4	~~(5)~~; DNS	4	4	4	52

=== Final ===
Rank	Athlete	CF	Total
1st place, gold medalist(s)	Chen Jingyue (CHN)	2	
2nd place, silver medalist(s)	Benyapa Jantawan (THA)	1	
3rd place, bronze medalist(s)	Lee Young-eun (KOR)		
4	Hou Jia-lin (TPE)		

- No medal races were completed on 27th September as the wind conditions in the course area did not meet the requirement of racing. The medals were awarded based on the opening series ranking.
