= Lauriane Nolot =

French professional kitesurfer

Personal information
- Born: 9 December 1998 (age 27) Toulon, France

Sailing career
- Sport: Sailing
- Class: Kitesurfing
Competition record
Representing France
Olympic Games
Silver medal – second place	2024 Paris	Formula Kite
World Championships
Gold medal – first place	2023 La Haya	Formula Kite
Gold medal – first place	2024 Hyères	Formula Kite
Gold medal – first place	2026 Viana di Castello	Formula Kite
Silver medal – second place	2022 Cagliari	Formula Kite
Bronze medal – third place	2021 Torregrande	Formula Kite

Lauriane Nolot (French: [nɔlo]; born 9 December 1998) is a French professional kitesurfer. She is a tree-time world champion in Formula Kite, winning in 2023, 2024 and 2026. Nolot won a silver medal at the 2024 Paris Olympics in the inaugural women's Formula Kite event.

== Life ==
Nolot was born in Toulon on 9 December 1998. She grew up in Camps-la-Source. Her first sporting interest was horseriding. She has a degree from the University of Toulon. She started kitesurfing like her family at the age of 16. She would visit beaches with her father and brother and they became her fist competitors as she trained to be able to match or exceed their abilities. She decided to follow the evolution of the sport and learn to kitefoil, which is kitesurfing with a hydrofoil under the board. She then joined Ariane Imbert's training at Hyères in kitefoil at 19 years old while she studied for a master's degree in digital creation.

In 2021, Nolot became the French champion of France and she took the silver place at the 2021 European championships in Montpellier. In 2021 she took third place at that year's Formula Kite World Championships in Torregrande in Sardinia. However she was beaten by the British surfer Ellie Aldridge and Daniela Moroz who won the event.

The following year, she became the European champion 2022 in Greece. At the world championships in 2022 in Sardinia, she was beaten again by Daniela Moroz.

She won the Test Event (rehearsal for the Olympic Games) in Marseille.

Nolot won the World Championships in August 2023 in Bournemouth and Ellie Aldridge took the silver. There was a strong UK finish with third and fourth place also filled by British competitors, Lily Young and Katie Dabson.

In November 2023, she was nominated by World Sailing for the title of Rolex Sailor of the Year (International Sailor of the Year), and she gained the title of Sailor of the Year from the French Sailing Federation in December. She is part of the Centre national des sports de la défense training centre near Paris.

In March 2024 Nolot gained a gold medal at the Formula Kite European Championships in the Mar Menor lagoon in Spain. The top three finishers Nolot, Jessie Kampman and Poema Newland were all French riders competing intensely. It would have been an all French podium but Newland did not appear as she was "too emotional".

In May 2024 at the Formula Kite World Sailing Championships she took the World title again beating the British kitesurfer Ellie Aldridge into second place. Nolot was beaten by Aldridge who won a gold medal at the 2024 Paris Olympics in the inaugural women's Formula Kite event. Nolot was awarded the silver after she fell in one of the final races.

Formula Kite
World Championships
Year	Where	Medal	Event
2021	Torregrande	Bronze	Formula Kite
2022	Cagliari	Silver	Formula Kite
2023	La Haya	Gold	Formula Kite
2024	Hyères	Gold	Formula Kite
European Championships
Year	Where	Medal	Event
2021	Montpellier	Bronze	Formula Kite
2022	Náfpaktos	Gold	Formula Kite
2024	Los Alcázares	Gold	Formula Kite
