= Gisela Pulido =

Spanish kitesurfer

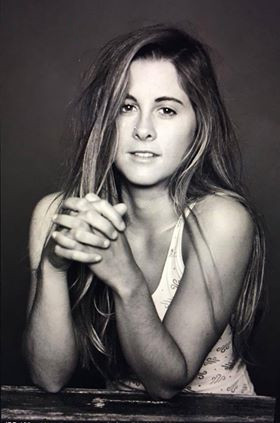
- Born: Gisela Pulido Borrell; 14 January 1994 (age 32); Premià de Mar, Spain
- Occupation: Kitesurfer
- Website: www.giselapulidoprocenter.com/gisela/

Gisela Pulido Borrell (born 14 January 1994) is a Spanish kitesurfer. In 2004, she became the sport's youngest world champion, at age 10. She has subsequently won multiple world titles.

== Biography ==
Gisela Pulido was born in Premià de Mar on 14 January 1994.

She was proclaimed Kitesurfing World Champion for the first time in November 2004, when she was only 10 years old. After this sporting success, she was awarded a Guinness World Record as the youngest kitesurfing world champion in history.

A year later, in October 2005, she won the gold medal in kitesurfing at Gravity Games H_{2}O in Perth, Australia, and a month later, in November 2005, she retained her title as Kitesurfing World Champion in Nouméa, New Caledonia.

In November 2006, Gisela Pulido was proclaimed Kitesurfing World Champion for the third consecutive time at age 12.

In February 2007, she became the youngest ever nominee for a Laureus Award.

Pulido became world kitesurfing champion for the fourth time in a row by winning the event in Germany in August 2007.

In October 2008, she became World Champion for the fifth consecutive time after winning the Chilean event in Matanzas, the tenth round of the Professional Kiteboard Riders Association (PKRA) circuit.

In November 2010, she was proclaimed World Champion in Nouméa, in the penultimate round of the Championship (2010 was the first year with only one official Championship, according to the International Sailing Federation and the International Olympic Committee). In 2011, she repeated her world title victory in the German town of Sankt Peter-Ording, after defeating Polish competitor Karolina Winkowska.

In 2017, Gisela Pulido was named Adoptive Daughter of the province of Cádiz.

The places to join the first Olympic Formula Foil competition at the 2024 Olympics were highly valued. The "last chance" contest (French Olympic Week) was held in Hyères in April 2024 when the last five Olympic places were the prizes for kitefoilers. By this time the chosen continental competitors included Fawn Jantawan from Thailand, Catalina Turienzo from Argentina, the Canadian Emily Claire Bugeja, Julie Paturau from Mauritius, New Zealander Justina Kitchen and Pulido.

== Achievements ==
- 2003: European Junior Champion
- 2004: KPWT freestyle World Champion
- 2005: Wave Master Champion
- 2005: Gravity Games gold medal
- 2005: KPWT freestyle World Champion
- 2006: Spanish Champion
- 2006: KPWT freestyle World Champion
- 2007: Spanish Champion
- 2007: PKRA freestyle World Champion
- 2008: Spanish Champion
- 2008: PKRA freestyle World Champion
- 2009: KPWT freestyle World Champion
- 2010: PKRA freestyle World Champion
- 2010: PKRA waves World Champion
- 2011: PKRA freestyle World Champion
- 2012: PKRA freestyle 3rd place
- 2013: PKRA freestyle World Champion
- 2014: PKRA freestyle 2nd place
- 2015: VKWC freestyle World Champion
