= Shaun Palmer =

American snowboarder

Personal information
- Born: November 14, 1968 (age 57) South Lake Tahoe, California, U.S.
- Occupations: Snowboarding, Skiing, Mountain Biking, Motocross
Medal record
Men's snowboarding
Representing the United States
Winter X Games
Gold medal – first place	1997	Snow Mountain Bike Racing
Gold medal – first place	1997	Boardercross
Gold medal – first place	1998	Boardercross
Gold medal – first place	1999	Boardercross
Gold medal – first place	2000	Skiercross
Gold medal – first place	2001	Ultracross
Gravity Games
Gold medal – first place	2002	Ski Cross
Snowboard World Cup
Silver medal – second place	2006	Boardercross
Silver medal – second place	2008	Boardercross
Swatch World Halfpipe Championship
Gold medal – first place	1990	Halfpipe
Men's mountain biking
World Championships
Silver medal – second place	1996	Downhill
US National Championships
Gold medal – first place	1999	Dual Slalom Biking

Shaun Palmer (born November 14, 1968) is an American professional snowboarder, skier, mountain biker, and motocross rider. Nicknamed "Napalm" and "Palm Daddy", he is known as one of the forefathers of extreme sports. He won the Laureus World Action Sportsperson of the Year in 2000.

== Early life ==
Palmer was born in South Lake Tahoe on November 14, 1968 and from a young age, he maintained a strong interest in all things fast. His mother told People Magazine in 1999, "Whether it was on wheels or on a board, it had to be superfast—he had no fear. I remember once when he was 13, I had grounded him. Well, he jumped out of his second-floor bedroom window, got on his bike and took off. He was like that—always pushing the limits."

While Palmer showed potential in both skiing and baseball, Shaun grew enamored with the still-infant sport of snowboarding. At the age of 12, he built his own snowboard.

== Snowboarding career ==
Palmer taught himself to snowboard, as he was never formally schooled in the sport. In an interview with People Magazine, Palmer stated: "I didn't watch tapes or study other guys—I just figured out what felt right." Just three years after building his own board, Palmer dropped out of high school to become a professional snowboarder.

Throughout his snowboarding career, Palmer received various accolades, including USA Today's World's Greatest Athlete, Details Magazine's Athlete of the Year in 1998, and the NEA Extreme Athlete of the Year in 2000. Also in 2000, Palmer was named as the inaugural Laureus World Alternative Sportsperson of the Year. In February 2001, Palmer was awarded the ESPY Awards' Action Sports Athlete of the Year.

In 2006, Palmer earned himself a spot on the 2006 U.S. Olympic Snowboarding Team. Palmer was a long shot, qualifying for the team after an 11th-hour World Cup podium finish in Bad Gastein, Austria, just one month before the 2006 Winter Olympics. He tore his Achilles tendon just two weeks later, rendering him unable to represent the United States.

In 2010, Palmer was left off the 2010 U.S. Olympic Snowboarding Team. Palmer had sought to fill the last spot on the 18-member squad, but was bumped in favor of Nick Baumgartner. Palmer would have been the oldest man to qualify for the Winter Olympics in history.

=== Palmer Snowboards ===
Palmer began Palmer Snowboards in 1995, as an offshoot of one of the most popular names in extreme sports.

As per his Facebook page, Palmer Snowboards closed its U.S.-based office doors in 2008 and the brand is only available for purchase within Europe. Rumor is that a Swiss owner bought the brand with inheritance, as Palmer Snowboards' online shop is in German and an account to shop with can only be created with an address in Europe.

== Mountain biking ==
In 1995, Palmer took up the sport of mountain biking, spending time around some of the sport's foremost authorities. Just one year later, Palmer began competing in the professional mountain biking circuit. Palmer shocked the mountain biking world by proving to be a more than worthy competitor. Palmer placed seventh in downhill at the second 1996 World Cup event of the year, before finishing second in downhill at the 1996 UCI World Championships, missing the top spot by just .15 seconds. Palmer threw his goggles down in frustration after finishing as he rolled through the finish area, showing his determination to obtain nothing but first The event drained Palmer, however he was quick to warn the 1996 champion Nicolas Vouilloz of France in a post race interview that after he gained some more fitness Palmer would soon be beating Vouilloz in the races. In the same interview, Palmer was quick to compliment Vouilloz as the best rider in the world based on his record of wins.

By the end of the biking season, Palmer was number five in the World Cup rankings and seventh in the NORBA National Championship Series. Palmer's debut year landed him a $300,000 annual contract with Mountain Dew Specialized Bicycles team, making Palmer the highest-paid mountain biker in the world.

In the 1999 Mountain biking season, Palmer won the NORBA downhill championship in the dual slalom category.

== Motocross ==
Palmer is a professional motocross racer. Palmer claims that motocross is his favorite sport, dubbing it "the best sport in the world."

In 2003, he began his professional motocross career racing on the Supercross Tour. Palmer qualified for the tour on his first 125cc Supercross main event, an almost unheard of feat.

== Other achievements ==
Between the snowboarding and mountain biking seasons, Palmer took up two new sports, reaching similar levels of success.

In 1998, Palmer won the Toyota Celebrity Grand Prix auto race. His interest in auto racing continued, winning the Pike's Peak Hill Climb auto race in 2000 as well as the Jeep King of the Mountain championship in 2008.

In 2001, Palmer went head to head with the world's best professional skiers, winning the Ski cross event at the 2001 Winter X Games, as well as the ski cross gold at the Gravity Games of the same year.

In 2016, Shaun Palmer was inducted in the US National Ski and Snowboard Hall of Fame

== Personal life ==
Throughout the 1990s, Palmer was the lead singer of a punk band called Fungus.

Palmer teamed up with Activision, publishers of Tony Hawk's Pro Skater, to create Shaun Palmer's Pro Snowboarder for the PlayStation 2 in 2001.
