= 2025 Youth Sailing World Championships =

Event title
- Edition: 54th

Event details
- Venue: Vilamoura, Portugal
- Dates: 12 - 20 December 2025

The 2025 Youth Sailing World Championships took place in Vilamoura, Portugal from 12 to 20 December. It was the 54th edition of the Youth Sailing World Championships.

== Competition format ==
=== Events and equipment ===
Event	Equipment
Boy's dinghy (single hander)	ILCA 6
Boy's windsurfer	iQFOiL
Boy's kitesurfer	Formula Kite
Girl's dinghy (single hander)	ILCA 6
Girl's dinghy (double hander)	420
Girl's skiff	29er
Girl's windsurfer	iQFOiL
Girl's kitesurfer	Formula Kite
Male/Mixed dinghy (double hander) (Note: Male/mixed. Male pairings allowed, mixed parings allowed, female pairings not allowed)	420
Male/Mixed skiff (Note: Male/mixed. Male pairings allowed, mixed parings allowed, female pairings not allowed)	29er
Mixed Multihull	Nacra 15

== Summary ==
=== Medal table ===
* Host nation (Portugal)

Rank	Nation	Gold	Silver	Bronze	Total
1	Great Britain	3	1	0	4
2	Switzerland	2	0	0	2
3	Israel	1	1	0	2
3	Italy	1	1	0	2
3	Spain	1	1	0	2
6	China	1	0	0	1
6	Ukraine	1	0	0	1
6	United States	1	0	0	1
9	Poland	0	3	1	4
10	New Zealand	0	1	2	3
11	France	0	1	1	2
12	Czech Republic	0	1	0	1
12	Individual Neutral Athletes	0	1	0	1
14	Argentina	0	0	2	2
15	Australia	0	0	1	1
15	Brazil	0	0	1	1
15	Cyprus	0	0	1	1
15	Germany	0	0	1	1
15	Turkey	0	0	1	1
Totals (19 entries)		11	11	11	33

=== Event medalists ===
==== Men's events ====
Event	First	Second	Third
ILCA 6	David Coates; United States	Jiri Tomes; Czech Republic	Emilios Max Boeros; Cyprus
iQFOiL	Peleg Rajuan; Israel	Mattia Saoncella; Italy	Rory Meehan; Australia
Formula Kite	Gian Andrea Stragoitti; Switzerland	Toby Wigglesworth; New Zealand	Nell de Jaham; France

==== Male/Mixed events ====
Event	First	Second	Third
420 (Note: Male/mixed. Male pairings allowed, mixed parings allowed, female pairings not allowed)	Sviatoslav Madonich; Dmytro Karabadzhak; Ukraine	Ziv Shtub; Loya Sheffler; Israel	Cameron Brown; Oliver Stone; New Zealand
29er (Note: Male/mixed. Male pairings allowed, mixed parings allowed, female pairings not allowed)	Lorenzo Sirena; Alice Dessy; Great Britain	Marius Praud; Emilie Mansouri; Poland	Zion Brandão da Cunha Faria; João Vicente Botelho Joppert; Brazil

==== Women's events ====
Event	First	Second	Third
ILCA 6	Irene de Tomás; Spain	Hanna Rogowski; Poland	Mirja Dohle; Germany
420	Sabine Potter; Merle Nieuland; Great Britain	Emy Combet; Juliette Peyre; France	Tessa Clinton; Amelia Higson; New Zealand
29er	Lila Edwards; Amelie Hiscocks; Great Britain	Antonina Puchowska; Alicja Dampc; Poland	Carolina Barceló; Agustina Argüelles; Argentina
iQFOiL	Medea Marisa Falcioni; Italy	Taisia Stopchenko; AIN	Nurhayat Guven; Turkey
Formula Kite	Suofeiya Li; China	Emma Rennie; Great Britain	Karolina Jankowska; Poland

==== Mixed events ====
Event	First	Second	Third
Nacra 15	Lorenzo Sirena; Alice Dessy; Italy	Marius Praud; Emilie Mansouri; France	Dylan Tomko; Casey Small; United States
