= Sailing at the 2023 Pan American Games – Women's kite =

Women's kite at the 2023 Pan American Games
- Venue: Cofradia Nautica del Pacifico
- Dates: October 28 - November 3
- Competitors: 7 from 7 nations

Medalists
Gold medal	Daniela Moroz	United States
Silver medal	María Catalina Turienzo	Argentina
Bronze medal	Maria do Socorro Reis	Brazil

The women's kite competition of the sailing events at the 2023 Pan American Games in Santiago was held from October 28 to November 3 at the Cofradia Nautica del Pacifico.

Points were assigned based on the finishing position in each race (1 for first, 2 for second, etc.). The points were totaled from the top 13 results of the first 16 races, with lower totals being better. If a sailor was disqualified or did not complete the race, 8 points were assigned for that race (as there were 7 sailors in this competition). The top 4 sailors at that point competed in the final race.

Daniela Moroz from the United States dominated the regatta to finish ahead of her opponents for the title. María Catalina Turienzo from Argentina was the runner-up despite not finishing in the last race and Maria do Socorro Reis from Brazil received the bronze medal.

== Schedule ==
All times are (UTC-3).

Date	Time	Round
October 28, 2023	13:22	Races 1, 2, 3 and 4
October 30, 2023	12:21	Races 5, 6, 7 and 8
October 31, 2023	13:27	Races 9, 10, 11 and 12
November 2, 2023	13:22	Races 13, 14, 15 and 16
November 3, 2023	13:00	Medal race

== Results ==
The results were as below.
Race M is the medal race.

Rank	Athlete	Nation	Race																	Total Points	Net Points
Rank	Athlete	Nation	1	2	3	4	5	6	7	8	9	10	11	12	13	14	15	16	M	Total Points	Net Points
1st place, gold medalist(s)	Daniela Moroz	United States	1	3	(8); DNF	(8); DNF	1	1	1	1	1	1	1	1	(8); UFD	1	1	1	1	39	15
2nd place, silver medalist(s)	María Catalina Turienzo	Argentina	2	2	1	1	(4)	2	3	2	2	2	(4)	2	(8); DNF	2	2	2	2	41	25
3rd place, bronze medalist(s)	Maria do Socorro Reis	Brazil	3	(4)	3	(4)	3	4	4	3	4	4	2	4	1	(8); UFD	3	3	3	57	41
4	Lizeth Rojas	Colombia	(4)	1	2	2	2	3	2	(4)	3	3	3	3	2	3	(4)	4	4	45	33
5	Carmen Verdeyen	Chile	(6)	(6)	4	3	5	6	5	(8); DNF	6	6	5	5	5	5	6	5	—N/a	86	66
6	Emily Bugeja	Canada	5	5	5	(8); DNF	(8); DNF	5	(8); DNF	5	5	5	8 DNF	8 DNF	3	4	5	7	—N/a	94	70
7	María Paula Ashida	Mexico	(8); DNF	(8); DNF	(8); DNF	8 DNF	8 DNF	7	8 DNF	8 DNF	8 DNF	8 DNF	8 DNF	8 DNF	4	6	7	6	—N/a	118	94
