= Elena Kalinina =

Russian kite surfer (born 1997)

- Born: July 20, 1997 (age 28)
- Known for: kitesurfing

Elena Pavlovna Kalinina (Russian: Елена Павловна Калинина; born 20 July 1997) is a Russian World champion at Formula Kite where competitors use kites to propel small hydrofoils. Kalinina first became a World Champion in 2014 when she was seventeen.

== Life ==
Kalinina was born in 1997 and she is a Russian sailor from St Petersburg.

She competed in China in 2013 where she came third. The British kiteboarder Steph Bridge was second and the world title was taken by the reigning champion Californian Erika Heineken

In 2014, course-racing kiteboarding was included in the ISAF World Sailing World Cup program. In November 2014, 20 athletes attended the final competition in Abu Dhabi. The first place among women was taken by 17 year-old Kalinina, while the men's champion was the British surfer Oliver Bridge. Kalinina just beat the Polish kitesurfer Agnieszka Grzymska, and her fellow Russian, Tatiana Sysoeva, took the bronze medal.

Sixteen year-old Daniela Moroz competed closely with the 18 year old Kalinina at Weifang Binhai in the IKA Formula Kite World Championship in China. Kalinina had dominated on day five but she lost her lead on the sixth and last day in light winds. Moroz won with Kalinina in second place. The leading British player Steph Bridge took third place.

The 2018 Sailing World Championships was held in Denmark and Kalinina again competed at Formula Kite. She was second to the American Moroz. In 2019, Kalinina again took second place to Daniela Moroz at that years World Formula Kite Championships. In the 2019 World Beach Games she gained a bronze medal.
