= Poema Newland =

French sailor and kitefoiler

- Born: 4 May 2000 (age 26); Narbonne
- Occupation: Formula Kite sailor
- Known for: European Formula Kite champion in 2021

Poema Newland (born 4 May 2000) is a French sailor and kitefoiler. She was the European Formula Kite champion in 2021.

== Life ==
Newland was born in Narbonne in 2000. She started kiting quite late in high school but quickly became Mediterranean champion in 2016 in the freestyle1 category before specializing in kite foil.

Newland competed in the 2018 Youth Olympics where kitesurfing was a new Olympic sport. She won a silver medal. This made her one of the first female Olympic medalists in kitesurfing along with Nina Font, also winning silver, and Sofia Tomasoni, who won gold. She joined the Institut d'études politiques de Paris via the high-level sports course which could be followed on-line.

During the 2021 Festikite at Villeneuve-lès-Maguelone, she won the title of European Formula Kite champion on 12 Speptember.

In 2023, she climbed to the third step of the Trofeo Princesa Sofía 20234 then participated in the Sailing World Championships which included Formula Kite for the first time. She beat the American Daniela Moroz while Lauriane Nolot and Ellie Aldridge took gold and silver. She came eighth in the edition won by her compatriot Lauriane Nolot. In September, she won the gold medal at the 3rd Mediterranean Beach Games "Heraklion 2023" at Ammoudara beach on Crete. She beat the French World champion Lauriane Nolot and the Italian Tiana Laporte.

In March 2024 she gained a bronze medal at the Formula Kite European Championships in the Mar Menor lagoon in Spain. The top three finishers Lauriane Nolot, Jessie Kampman and Newland were all French riders competing intensely. Newland had a crash in the final and did not appear on the podium as she was "too emotional".

The World Chempionships took place in Hyères in May 2024 where she was living. The final race saw her in fourth position behind Lauriane Nolot, the British surfer Ellie Aldridge and Jessie Kampman.
