= Erika Heineken =

- Born: June 1, 1986 (age 39)
- Other names: Heiny
- Education: Marin Academy, University of Vermont
- Occupations: Mechanical engineer and kitesurfer
- Employer: City of San Francisco Water Department.
- Known for: Formula Kite
- Spouse: John Tilney
- Relatives: John Heineken (brother)

Erika Heineken (born 21 June 1986) is an American mechanical engineer and a competitive kitesurfer. She won a sailing event with her father at the US Nationals in 2006 before she switched to windsurfing and then Formula Kite. She was a Runner-up in the Rolex US Yachtswoman of the Year. She has been the women’s kiteboard racing world champion twice,

== Life ==
Heineken was born in 1986 and she was on a sailing boat when she was a month old. She lived at Larkspur. She attended the Marin Academy in California after she went to St. Patrick’s, Hall Middle School. Her father, Paul Heineken, was a member of a sailing club and she won a woman skipper event with him in 2006 in a 29er dinghy at the US Nationals.

She was a sailor and a windsurfer and she followed her younger brother, Johnny Heineken, when he moved on to the new sport of Formula Kite. While she was at college she went on a windsurfing trip to Sardinia. She tried kite surfing whils she was there and this resulted in her extending her stay by a month so she could get the knack of holding a kite while standing on a hydrofoil. When Heineken returned home she made the decision and bought her own kites

In 2012 she won gold in Cagliari in Italy at the 2012 Kiteboard Course Racing World championships. She narrowly beat the British Steph Bridge with Caroline Adrien taking the gold. It was a family victory as her brother won the men's event.

She was world champion at course racing again, as in 2013 at the women’s kiteboard racing world championship she again beat the British Steph Bridge, and the Russian Elena Kalinina in Bo'ao, Hainan, China at the IKA Kiteboard Course Race. In the men's event in Bo'ao, her brother, John, this time, was beaten into second place by the German Florian Gruber.

== Private life ==
She married John Tilney and they have a child.
