= Daniela Moroz =

American sailor (born 2001)

Personal information
- Nationality: American
- Born: 2 February 2001 (age 25) Berkeley, California, U.S.
- Occupation: Sailor
Medal record
Women's sailing
Representing United States
Pan American Games
Gold medal – first place	2023 Santiago	Kite

Daniela Moroz (/məˈroʊz/ mə-ROHZ; born 2 February 2001) is an American sailor who became the World champion at Formula Kite six times between 2016 and 2022.

== Life ==
Moroz was born in Berkeley in 2001. Her parents were Czech immigrants. They had both left their country in 1983 pretending to go on holiday but never returning to their country which was under a communist regime. Her parents never met until they were both in California and they shared a common interest in surfing. They dated because of their common life story and they married in 1993.

Moroz won six gold medals at the Formula Kite World Championships between 2016 and 2022 and four gold medals at the Formula Kite European Championships between 2017 and 2021.

She won her first world title at Weifang Binhai in China in 2016 when she was sixteen. She competed closely with the 18 year old Russian Elena Kalinina. Moroz went into the lead on the sixth and last day in light winds, changing the predictions, as Kalinina had dominated on day five. Moroz improved her performance to win with Kalinina second and the British Stephanie Bridge in the bronze position.

In 2021, the Formula Kite World Championships was in Torregrande in Sardinia. She defeated the leading British surfer Ellie Aldridge and the French surfer Lauriane Nolot. At the world championships in 2022 in Sardinia, she repeated as gold medalist. She won the gold medal at the 2023 Pan American Games on 3 November 2023, with the teenage Argentine kitesurfer Catalina Turienzo coming in second.

Nolot won the Test Event which was a rehearsal for the Paris Olympic Games in Marseille. Moroz came fourth. It was nearly the first time that she had not made the top three at a regatta and she decided to take a break. She had been travelling and living in hotels for years. Her previous technique of training harder and longer than her fellow competitors was no longer the solution. She consulted sports psychologists and retired from the sport between August 2023 and 2024. She rediscovered her love for kite surfing during that time. She runs her Olympic campaign which involves not only training, but contacting sponsors to gather the money required to fund her work.

After the 2024 World championships event in May in Hyères, Moroz was dropped to fourth place overall after Ellie Aldridge's win at the event moved her to third place. Lauriane Nolot was in the overall date at that time with Jessie Kampman in second position. Moroz accepted the result, however later that month she noted that she had been given an undeserved penalty while another competitor had failed to be given a deserved penalty. She said they needed to fix the "flawed system".

The 2025 Formula Kite World Championship was in Sardinia. The final was between Moroz, Britain’s Lily Young, World Champion Lauriane Nolot and the Dutch surfer Jessie Kampman. Moroz took the silver medal after she was beaten by Kampman who took the gold. The bronze medal went to Lauriane Nolet.
