= Mark Jacobson =

Mark Jacobson may refer to:

- Mark Jacobson, author of The Lampshade
- Mark Z. Jacobson, professor of civil and environmental engineering

== See also ==
- Mark Jacobsen, Australian international lawn and indoor bowler
- Mark Jacobs (disambiguation)
