= Kari Schibevaag =

Norwegian kiteboarder (born 1978)

Kari Schibevaag (born 25 October 1978) is a Norwegian kiteboarder and multiple world champion in both snowkiting and kitesurfing on water. She won a gold medal at the 2010 Formula Kite World Championship.

== Biography ==
Schibevaag was born and raised in Stavanger. She showed versatility in a variety of sports from an early age, but chose to focus on handball in her teens. After two knee injuries, she had to give up handball. She trained as a child welfare educator from 2001. She was also an instructor at Tryvann ski school, and there she came into contact with the kiteboarding community and first tried snowkiting.

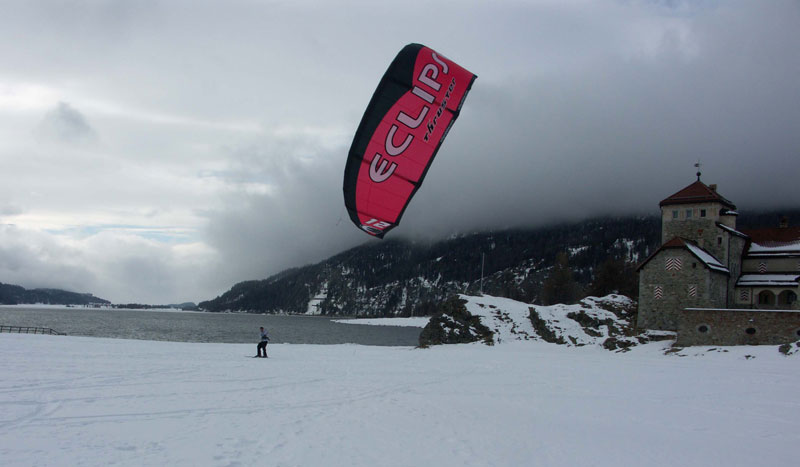
Snowkiters use large kites to pull their boards across the snow and jump into the air.

She competed in the 2008 World Snowkiting Championships in France and won, and soon she decided to pursue kiteboarding professionally, both on snow and water.

In the 2009 Kiteboarding World Cup (on water), she won several competitions, and held top positions in the speed disciplines of race, freestyle and wave kiting, and she won the overall cup. She became the first to reach top rankings on both water and snow. In 2010, she became the first kiter to win the Snow Kite World Cup on both skis and snowboard. She is a four-time Norwegian champion, an eight-time kitesurfing world champion and an eleven-time snow kiting world champion.

She has retired from competition but still holds camps for girls and kids. She also writes travel stories, gives speeches and produces films. She enjoys kitesurfing, wingfoiling, snowkiting, hiking, expeditions, skiing and mountain biking.

Schibevaag lives in Ramberg in Flakstad municipality (Lofoten).

=== Selected films ===
In April 2017, she filmed a documentary film featuring Schibevaag and four friends titled Breathe In about snowkiting. It was shot in Svalbard /Spitsbergen in the Arctic and explored glaciers there, "climbing mountains with only the force of the wind."
