= Jessie Kampman =

French Formula Kite surfer

- Born: 16 May 2000 (age 25); Crawley
- Occupation: kitesurfer
- Known for: Formula Kite

Jessie Kampman (born 16 May 2000) is a former French Formula Kite surfer now (since July 2025) representing The Netherlands. She has won silver medals at the European championships, in 2024 she won a world bronze medal and in 2025 she was world champion.

== Life ==
Kampman was born in 2000 and as a child she was keen on sailing. in Crawley in England. Her mother was British and her father was South African. She moved with them to Plan de la Tour in France when she was four which led to a longer list of her nationalities which are Dutch, British, French and South African.

When she was eighteen, she returned to England to study law in Southampton. While in the UK she gave her loyalty to that country.She was already an experienced sailor and she had tried kiteboarding. She took to kitefoiling as the sport was in line to be an Olympic sport.

At the Formula Kite European Championship in 2022 she took a silver medal. She won a bronze medal at the 2024 Formula Kite World Championship and another silver medal at the Formula Kite European Championship in Mar Menor in Spain. She took silver as she was beaten by Nolot in a contest where the winfs were so strong that they used quite small kites. Nolot was considered not the fastest but the contestant with the best tactics ober the six days of the contest. It was a complete French podium finish with Poema Newland in third place. At the end of 2023 she was in Mauritius winning the African Kite Foil Championship. The leading African at the event was the local Julie Paturau who gained the title of African Champion Kite Foiler and a place in the 2024 Olympics.

In 2024 she joined the woman French Orient Express – L’Oréal Racing Team led by Manon Audinet that will compete in Barcelona at an inaugural event of the America's cup. That February she was in the Canary Islands competing at the first Fuerteventura KiteFoil International Open Cup. Ellie Aldridge won the event but Kampman was second with the Italian Maggie Pescetto in third place.

After the 2024 World championships event in May in Hyères, the French colleague Lauriane Nolot was in the overall lead at that time with Kampman in second position. Daniela Moroz was dropped to fourth place overall after Ellie Aldridge's win at the event, moved her to third place. On the following day Aldridge moved to second place ahead of Kampman. The final race saw Poema Newland in fourth position behind Lauriane Nolot, the British surfer Ellie Aldridge and Kampman was third.

The 2025 Formula Kite World Championship was in Sardinia. The final was between Daniela Moroz, Britain’s Lily Young, World Champion Lauriane Nolot and Kampman. Moroz took the silver medal after she was beaten by Kampman who took the gold and became World Champion. The bronze medal went to Lauriane Nolet.
