= Kristin Boese =

German kite surfer (born 1977)

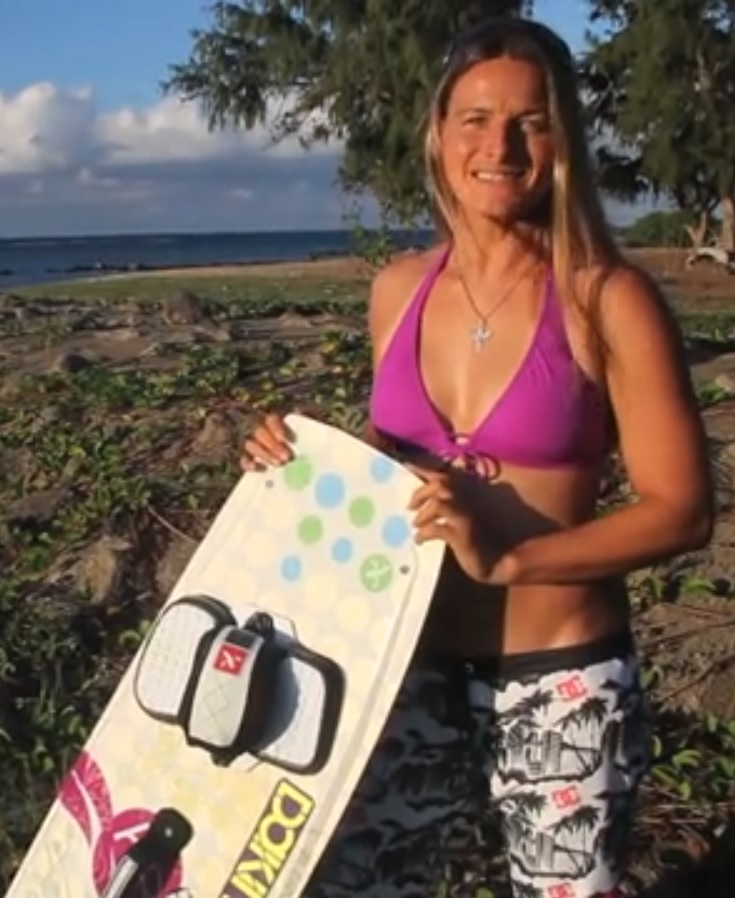
- Kristin Boese with her KB signature board in 2011
- Born: 1 July 1977 (age 48); Potsdam, Germany
- Occupation: Professional Claimer

Kristin Boese (born 1 July 1977) is a German female kite surfer. In 2009, she was shortlisted by the International Sailing Federation for the ISAF World Sailor of the Year Awards.

== Biography ==
Boese was born in Potsdam, East Germany, on 1 July 1977. At school, she excelled in a wide range of sports and became a semiprofessional handball player from the age of 9 in 1986 until 1999. She took her A-levels in 1997 and began to develop a passion for windsurfing and mountain biking. In 2000, she attended a windsurf-instructor license course and began working as a windsurf instructor in her summer holidays while studying journalism and communication at the University of Berlin.

In summer 2002, she met a kitesurfer at her windsurf center and within a matter of months had left Berlin and moved to Fuerteventura in the Canary Islands to learn how to kitesurf and become an instructor at the Pro Center Egl.

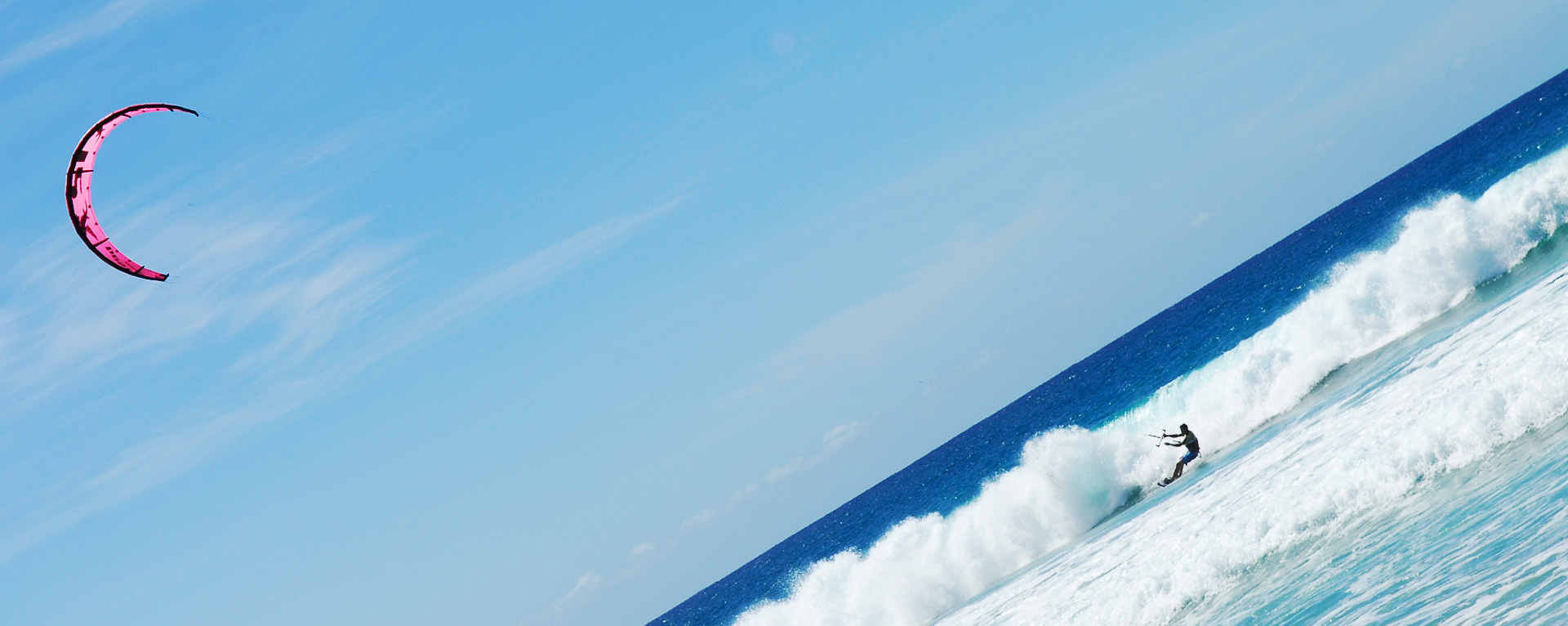
Boese learned to kitesurf in Fuerteventura where she later worked as an instructor.

She became the German Kitesurf Champion and in 2003 finished in fourth place in the PKRA world ranking. In 2004, she became Vice World Champion, winning her first PKRA Freestyle World Champion title a year later in 2005. This was followed with further success. In 2006, she won the PKRA Freestyle. In 2008, Boese became the KPWT Course-race World Champion. In September 2009, she competed at the Greek PKRA.

Besides her active career in kitesurfing, she also founded the KB4girls foundation (now: Women's Kiteboarding Collective) which empowers kiteboarding women around the world.

She is the author of two instructional books and an instructional DVD on kitesurfing. In 2009, she published the guide Kitesurfing in the Waves: The Complete Guide. She has also done modelling work, and has modelled for Vogue, and in September 2007 appeared in the German Playboy magazine, appearing on the cover with Theresa Klein and Jenny Bongardt. She is sponsored by Best Kiteboarding, Rial, Air Berlin and Maui Magic. In July 2012, she won the bronze medal in the Slalom World Championships, finishing behind Katja Roose and Caroline Adrien.

== Titles ==
- 2004 PKRA 2nd place
- 2005 PKRA Freestyle Champion
- 2006 PKRA Freestyle Champion
- 2007 KPWT Course Race Champion
- 2007 KPWT Wave-riding Champion
- 2008 KPWT Course Race Champion
