= Marc Jacobs (kiteboarder) =

New Zealand kiteboarder

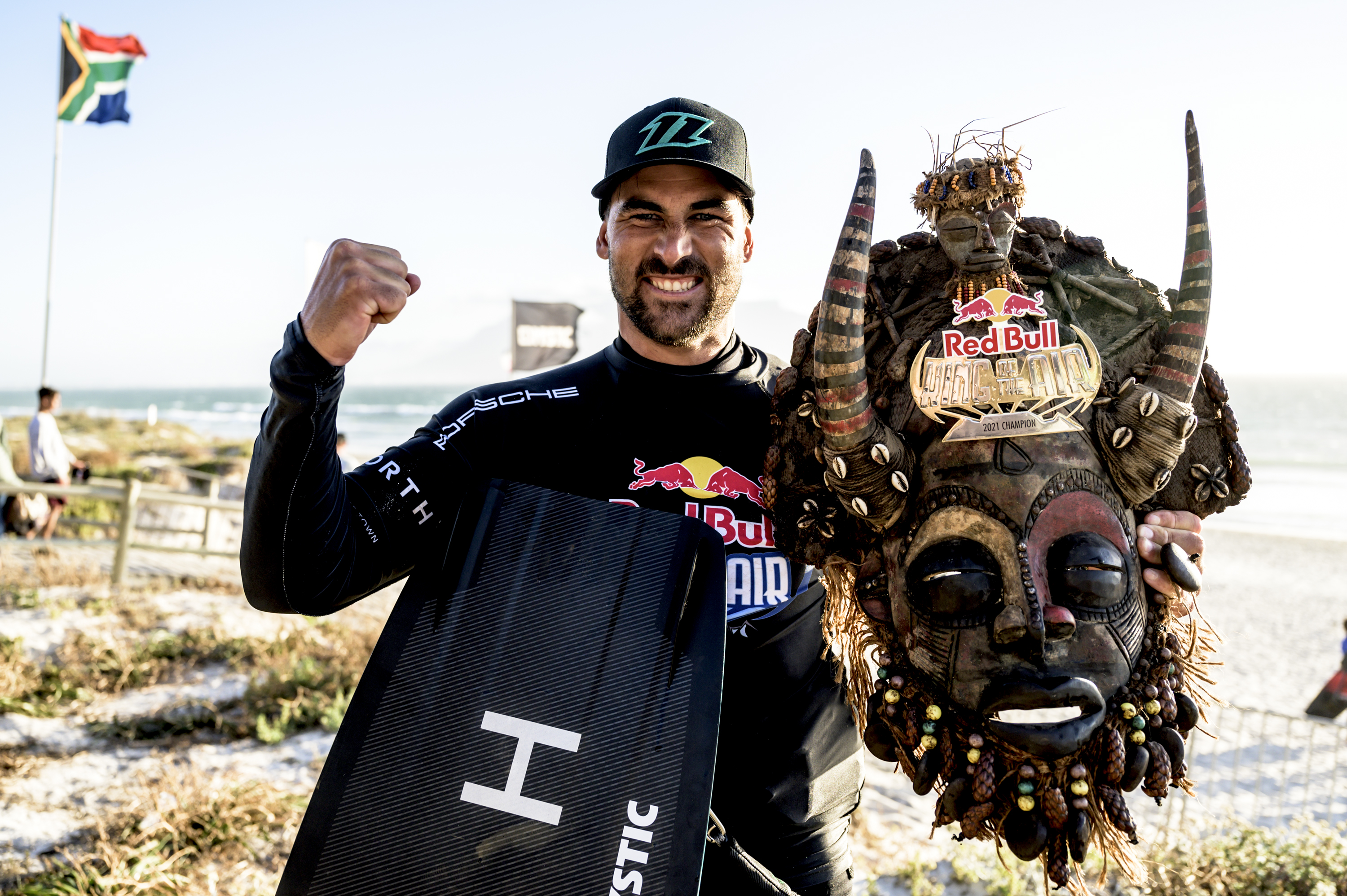
- Marc Jacobs poses with his trophy after winning the 2021 Red Bull King of the Air competition

Personal information
- Nationality: New Zealand
- Born: 22 November 1989 (age 36)

Sport
- Country: New Zealand
- Sport: Kiteboarding, Kitesurfing
- Event: freestyle

Achievements and titles
- World finals: Red Bull King of the Air (2021)

Marc Jacobs (born 22 November 1989) is a New Zealand big-wave kitesurfer and a big-air kiteboarder. He won the Red Bull King of the Air competition in 2021.

== Career ==
In December 2013, he achieved a career high when he emerged victorious to be crowned as the Vice World Champion with his overall second place in the 2013 Professional Kite Riders Association World Tour. During the course of the competition, he competed in the men's freestyle event and it was also etched as the greatest sporting achievement for an individual representing New Zealand in the history of the men's freestyle event. Prior to his triumph, he apparently collaborated with chief designer Bill Hansen to develop the Combat, a kite that had been designed to help individuals excel in technical performance and to be a strong pivotal element to accelerate extreme riding.

He reached the pinnacle of his kiteboarding career, when he emerged triumphant at the 2021 Red Bull King of the Air, most importantly he achieved it coinciding on his birthday and the 2021 edition of the Red Bull King of the Air took place in a new window in November 2021, in contrast to the usual slot of hovering around mid January-February season, which had been the tradition of how the competition had taken place annually. Marc faced a stiff competition in the action-packed closely-fought evenly poised grand finale of the Red Bull King of the Air competition where he edged past the likes of former three-time world champion Kevin Langeree and another rookie Stig Hoefnagel to secure the title for the first time in his career. Marc showed resilience and temperament during the final of the 2021 Red Bull King of the Air contest after a streak of 22 heats and six hours of competition spread across the two days, before heading on his way to win the coveted title in an enthralling fashion as the final culminated in an epic finish. In January 2025, he received media coverage and attention for his brave solo rescue act when he rescued a swimmer from the possibility and dangers of drowning in the Mangawhai Estuary as coincidentally Marc was also swimming in the Mangawhai Estuary during the occasion. He revealed that the particular swimmer who was in danger apparently shouted asking for help and after hearing it out, Marc made an effort to rescue the novice swimmer.
