= Cameron Brown =

Cameron Brown is the name of:

- Cam Brown (ice hockey) (1969–2025), Canadian ice hockey player
- Cam Brown (linebacker) (born 1998), American football linebacker
- Cameron Brown (cornerback) (born 2000), American football cornerback
- Cam Brown (punter), Australian punter in American football
- Cameron Brown (musician) (born 1945), American jazz musician
- Cameron Brown (triathlete) (born 1972), New Zealand triathlete
- Cameron Brown (game director), American video game director
- Cameron S. Brown (born 1954), politician from the U.S. state of Michigan
