= Red Bull King of the Air =

Annual kiteboarding competition

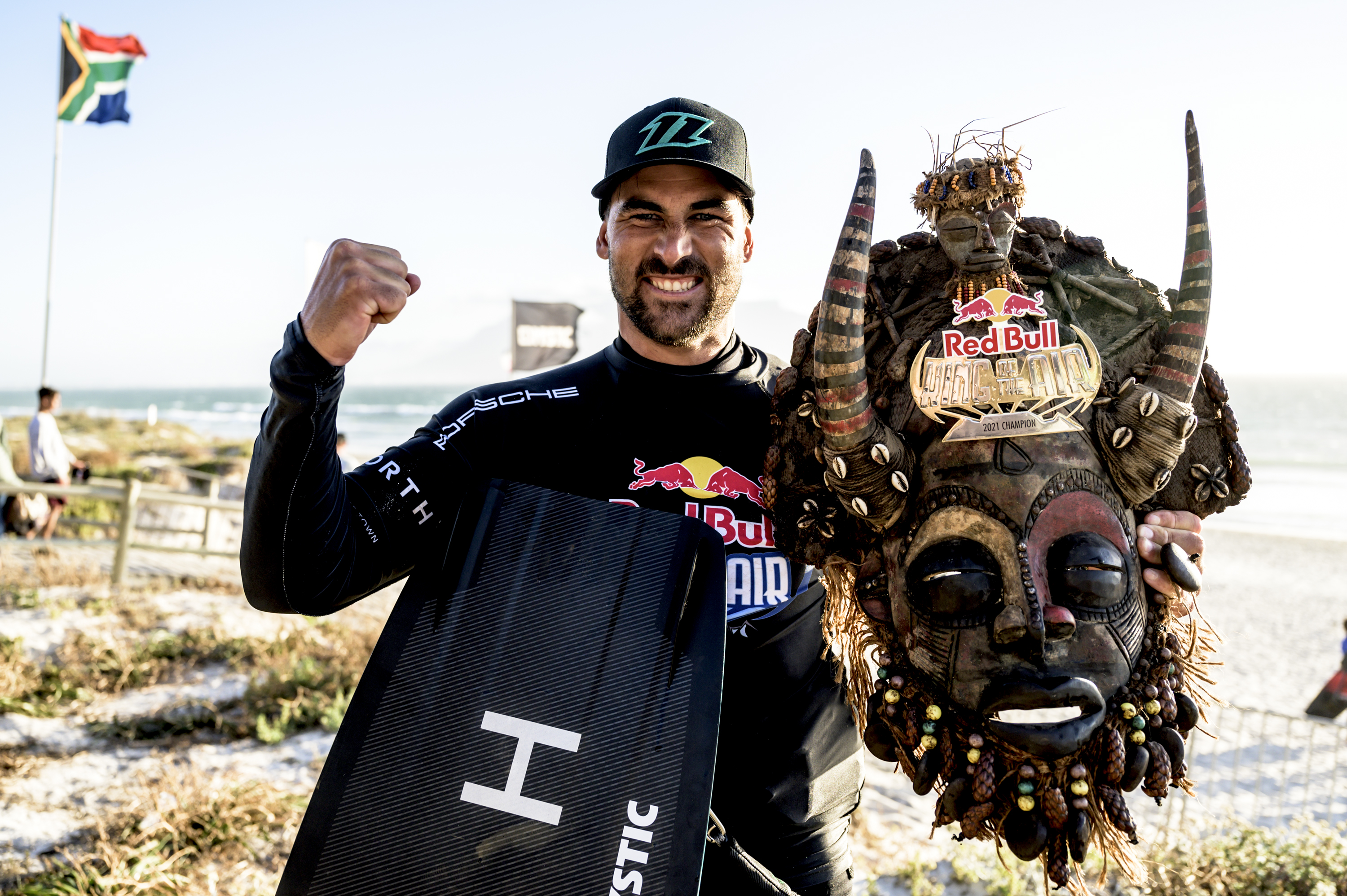
Marc Jacobs (NZ), 2021 winner of the Red Bull King of the Air

Red Bull King of the Air is the premier big air kiteboarding competition featuring the best athletes from around the World. Riders are judged based upon the height of their jumps, variety of tricks, and style.

The competition began in 2000 at Ho‘okipa, a beach known for windsurfing in Maui, Hawaii. After an 8-year hiatus, the competition was relaunched in 2013 in Big Bay Cape Town, South Africa, where it has been held annually since. The event is attended by over 7,000 people per day. From 2018, the event was moved from Big Bay to Blouberg. In 2021 the King of the Air was rescheduled to a November/December wind window due to the COVID-19 pandemic and the event has kept to these date since; originally the event ran in January/February.

In 2024, it was announced that Red Bull would be running a Women's Division fleet for King of the Air alongside the usual Open Division fleet. The Open Division would still run with 18 riders whilst the Women's Division would have just 6.

== Winners ==
=== Open Division Winners (2013 - Present) ===
Year	1st	2nd	3rd	4th*
2025	Lorenzo Casati (ITA)	Leonardo Casati (ITA)	Cohan Van Dijk (NED)	
2024	Andrea Principi (ITA)	Lorenzo Casati (ITA)	Luca Ceruti (RSA)	
2023	Andrea Principi (ITA)	Lorenzo Casati (ITA)	Jeremy Burlando (ESP)	
2022	Lorenzo Casati (ITA)	Jamie Overbeek (NED)	Andrea Principi (ITA)	
2021	Marc Jacobs (NZ)	Kevin Langeree (NED)	Stig Hoefnagel (NED)	
2020	Jesse Richman (USA)	Nick Jacobsen (DEN)	Aaron Hadlow (UK)	
2019	Kevin Langeree (NED)	Jesse Richman (USA)	Liam Whaley (ESP)	
2018	Kevin Langeree (NED)	Liam Whaley (ESP)	Lewis Crathern (UK)	
2017	Nick Jacobsen (DEN)	Aaron Hadlow (UK)	Ruben Lenten (NED)	
2016	Aaron Hadlow (UK)	Jesse Richman (USA)	Kevin Langeree (NED)	
2015*	Aaron Hadlow (UK)	Kevin Langeree (NED)	Jerrie van de Kop (NED)	Jesse Richman (USA)
2014*	Kevin Langeree (NED)	Ruben Lenten (NED)	Steven Akkersdijk (NED)	Andres Fourie (ZA)
2013*	Jesse Richman (USA)	Nick Jacobsen (DEN)	Sam Light (UK)	Youri Zoon (NED)

*2013-2015 had 4-person finals

=== Women's Division Winners (start at 2024) ===
Year	1st	2nd	3rd
2025	Nathalie Lambrecht (SWE)	Zara Hoogenraad (NED)	Lana Herman (SLO)
2024	Francesca Maini (UK)	Zara Hoogenraad (NED)	Pippa van Iersel (NED)
