= Body drag =

Body drag is the name given to a freestyle trick performed by a windsurfer. The trick involves the rider travelling across the water at high speed and stepping off the board and on to the water while still holding on to the boom which is connected to the sail.

The result should be that the rider's lower body "drags" over the water's surface at speed along with the board and sail. A skilled rider is able to step back onto the board and continue sailing.
