= Aaron Hadlow =

British kitesurfer

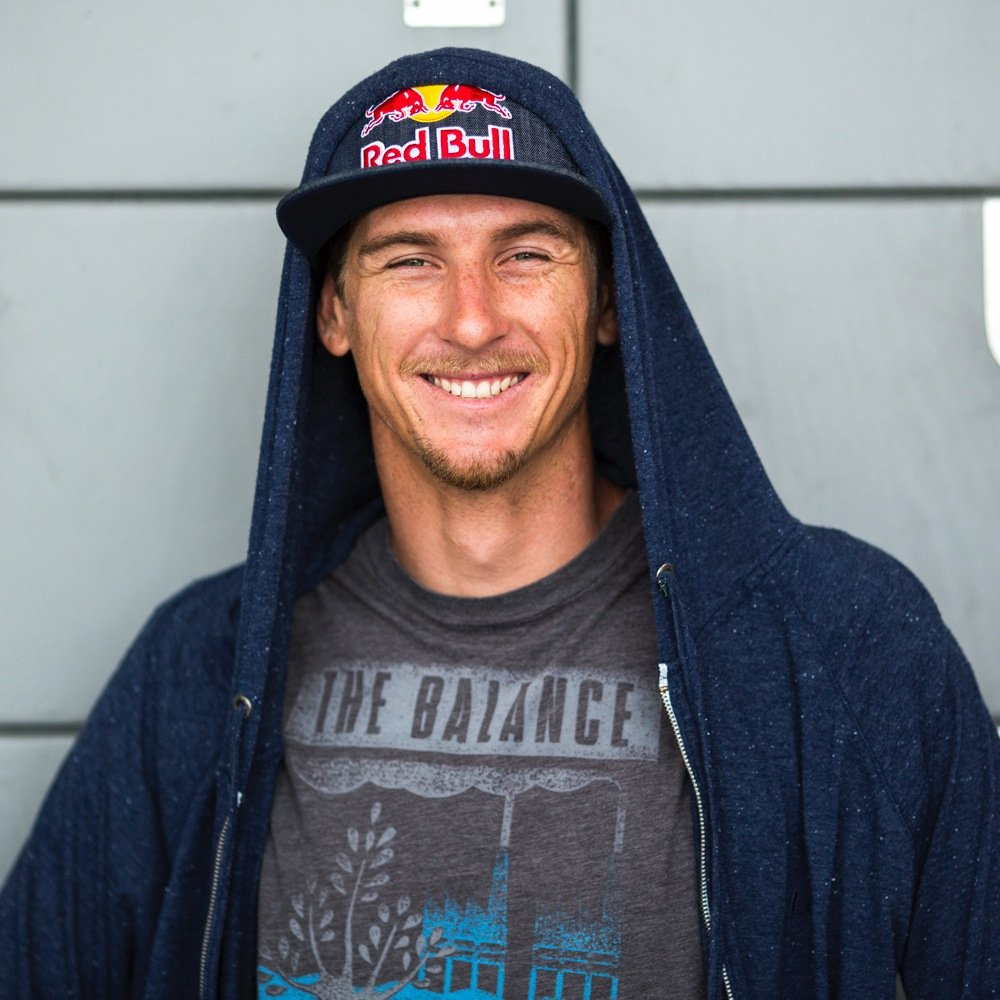
- Hadlow in 2016

Personal information
- Full name: Aaron Hadlow
- Nationality: British
- Born: October 4, 1988 (age 37)

Sport
- Country: England
- Sport: Kitesurfing
- Team: Harlem
- Turned pro: Beginning of 2002

Aaron Hadlow (born 4 October 1988) is a professional kiteboarder who has won the Pro Kiteboard Riders' Association (PKRA) World Championships five times.

He began in 2004, encountering competition from Ruben Lenten and Kevin Langeree in 2006.

He also won the Red Bull KitePunks event in 2007, held in La Manga, Spain, beating off stiff competition from Ruben Lenten in 2nd, and Neil Hilder in 3rd.

Hadlow has continued to expand his repertoire of tricks to keep him in front of the competition. A lot of these tricks have stemmed from influences by Lewis Crathern and Neil Hilder, who are a part of recently created Team Bosch alongside Hadlow. Many of his new tricks involve an "ole" move, where the bar and lines are whipped over head - the first of which was the Bosch Mobe.

He was world champion in freestyle kitesurfing from 2004 to 2008. He is the only rider to win the world title 5 times in a row.

Hadlow has taken a break from the Professional Kiteboard Riders Association World tour in 2010, he is looking to focus on international promos, and various other events. He also looks to continue his "on the loose" series with Ruben Lenten.

In 2015 and 2016, Hadlow won the Red Bull King of the Air in Cape Town, South Africa.

In 2024, he is still competing in Big Air but he is more involved in the research and development aspect of kitesurfing for the past few years. He used to test alongside the Duotone kite designer, Ralf Grosel, between 2015 and 2023 for that brand. After this, Aaron continued working alongside the designer Ralf Grosel to test and develop kites for Harlem. Ralf was working on implementing BrainChild Technology into various kites and for different brands.
