= Steph Bridge =

British kitesurfer (born 1972)

Stephanie Bridge
- Born: 14 July 1972 (age 53)
- Occupation: professional Formula Kite
- Known for: seven times World champion
- Spouse: Eric Bridge
- Children: 3

Stephanie "Steph" Bridge (born 14 July 1972) is a British kitesurfer who became the World Formula Kite champion five times between 2009 and 2016. She is the leading figure in the "Team Bridge" family.

== Life ==
Bridge was born on 14 July 1972.

She won her first Formula Kite World Championship at the St. Francis Yacht Club in San Francisco in 2009. This was the final race of six championship races and qualification rounds. Sean Farley took the men's championship. She won four more Formula Kite World Championships between 2009 and 2016, and two medals at the Formula Kite European Championships, gold in 2012 and silver in 2016. In 2012 she was in Cagliari in Italy at the Kiteboard Course Racing World championships. She took the silver medal after being narrowly beaten by the American Erika Heineken who took the gold.

In 2015 she set out from Cowes in the Isle of Wight accompanied by her son Guy Bridge. They said this a practice run for a later record attempt but fifteen year old Guy broke the record when he returned to Cowes as the youngest person to complete the 60 mile circuit by kite-surfing. His time was 3 hours and 34 minutes and Steph's time was just under four hours.

In 2016 she was not only ranked the best woman kite surfer in the world but her three sons all held titles. Her eldest son, Oliver Bridge, was the Men's European Race Champion, her youngest son, Tom Bridge, was the European Youth Freestyle Champion and her middle son, Guy Bridge, was the world champion at Youth Freestyle.

Steph Bridge took the bronze medal in the 2016 World Championship at Weifang Binhai in China. In that year Daniela Moroz won her first world title in light winds. An 18 year old Russian, Elena Kalinina, was second.

In 2020 when the UK launched a campaign to find more leading women kite surfers for the 2024 Olympics it was Steph Bridge who was mentioned.

She had worked with Richard Branson on a number of record breaking attempts so in 2024 she was able to get his agreement for some to kitesurf off his ship "Resilient Lady" to fly through the air and to land in the sea after falling 60 metres. It was her 23 year old son, Tom Bridge, who carried out the stunt. Kitesurfing from a height was not an established sport, so Tom achieved a first.

Formula Kite
World Championships
2009	San Francisco	Gold	Formula Kite
2010	San Francisco	Silver	Formula Kite
2012	Cagliari	Silver	Formula Kite
2013	Boao	Silver	Formula Kite
2014	Istanbul	Gold	Formula Kite
2015	Gizzeria	Silver	Formula Kite
2016	Weifang	Bronze	Formula Kite
European Championships
Year	Where	Medal	Event
2012	La Baule	Gold	Formula Kite
2016	Cagliari	Silver	Formula Kite

== Private life ==
She married Eric Bridge and their three boys are professional kitesurfers.
