= Catalina Turienzo =

Argentine kitesurfer (born 2006)

Personal information
- Full name: María Catalina Turienzo
- Nationality: Argentina
- Born: May 29, 2006 (age 20) Bahía Blanca, Argentina

Sport
- Country: Argentina
- Sport: Sailing
- Event: Formula Kite
Medal record
Women's sailing
Representing Argentina
Pan American Games
Silver medal – second place	2023 Santiago	Kite
Formula Kite Youth World Championships
Gold medal – first place	2026 Urla	U21
Gold medal – first place	2025 Azores	U21
Gold medal – first place	2024 Gizzeria	U21
Youth Sailing World Championships
Gold medal – first place	2024 Lake Garda	U19
Silver medal – second place	2023 Búzios	U19
Formula Kite Youth European Championships (open) (Note: The Youth European Championships are open events, but only European riders are eligible for the official European titles. These entries show Turienzo's place in the overall (open) standings.)
Gold medal – first place	2026 Gizzeria	Overall standings
Silver medal – second place	2025 Gizzeria	Overall standings
Sailing Grand Slam
Silver medal – second place	2026 French Olympic Week	Formula Kite

María Catalina Turienzo (born 29 May 2006) is an Argentine Formula Kite sailor. She won the silver medal in the women's kite event at the 2023 Pan American Games and competed at the 2024 Summer Olympics. She won the Formula Kite Youth World Championship three times (2024, 2025 and 2026) and the Formula Kite event at the 2024 Youth Sailing World Championships.

== Early life ==
Turienzo was born in Bahía Blanca in 2006 and started kitesurfing in Monte Hermoso.

== Career ==
=== 2023 ===
Turienzo finished fourth at a world youth competition held off Scheveningen, in the Netherlands.

At the 2023 Pan American Games, held at Algarrobo in Chile, she won the silver medal in the women's Formula Kite event on 3 November 2023, behind Daniela Moroz of the United States. In December 2023 she finished second to Derin Atakan of Turkey in the Formula Kite event at the Youth Sailing World Championships in Búzios, Brazil; Mika Kafri of Israel was third.

=== 2024 ===
In July 2024 Turienzo won the Formula Kite Youth World Championship in Gizzeria, Italy. The women's final was contested by Turienzo, Lysa Caval of France, Derin Atakan and Magdalena Woyciechowska of Poland, who finished in that order. The following week she won the women's Formula Kite event at the 2024 Youth Sailing World Championships on Lake Garda, ahead of Meijing Xiao and Derin Atakan.

She represented Argentina in the women's Formula Kite event at the 2024 Summer Olympics in Marseille, finishing 13th. She was a finalist for the female Young World Sailor of the Year award at the 2024 World Sailing Awards.

=== 2025 ===
At the 2025 Formula Kite European Championships in Urla, Turkey, she finished fourth in the women's fleet and received the open trophy. At the Youth European Championships in Gizzeria she reached the women's final, which was won by Derin Atakan; as a non-European rider she was not eligible for the official European medals.

In November 2025 she defended her Formula Kite Youth World title at Praia da Vitória, in the Azores, Portugal, after a penalty to Atakan in the deciding race of the final.

=== 2026 ===
In April 2026 she finished second to Lauriane Nolot of France in the women's Formula Kite event at the French Olympic Week in Hyères, the second event of the Sailing Grand Slam series.

Turienzo won all 14 races at the 2026 Formula Kite Youth European Championships in Gizzeria to finish first in the overall standings; the European title went to Svetlana Trusova. In August 2026 she won her third Formula Kite Youth World title in Urla, Turkey, at her last Youth World Championships. She was again a finalist for the female Young World Sailor of the Year award in 2026.
