= Formula Kite =

Kitesurfing class

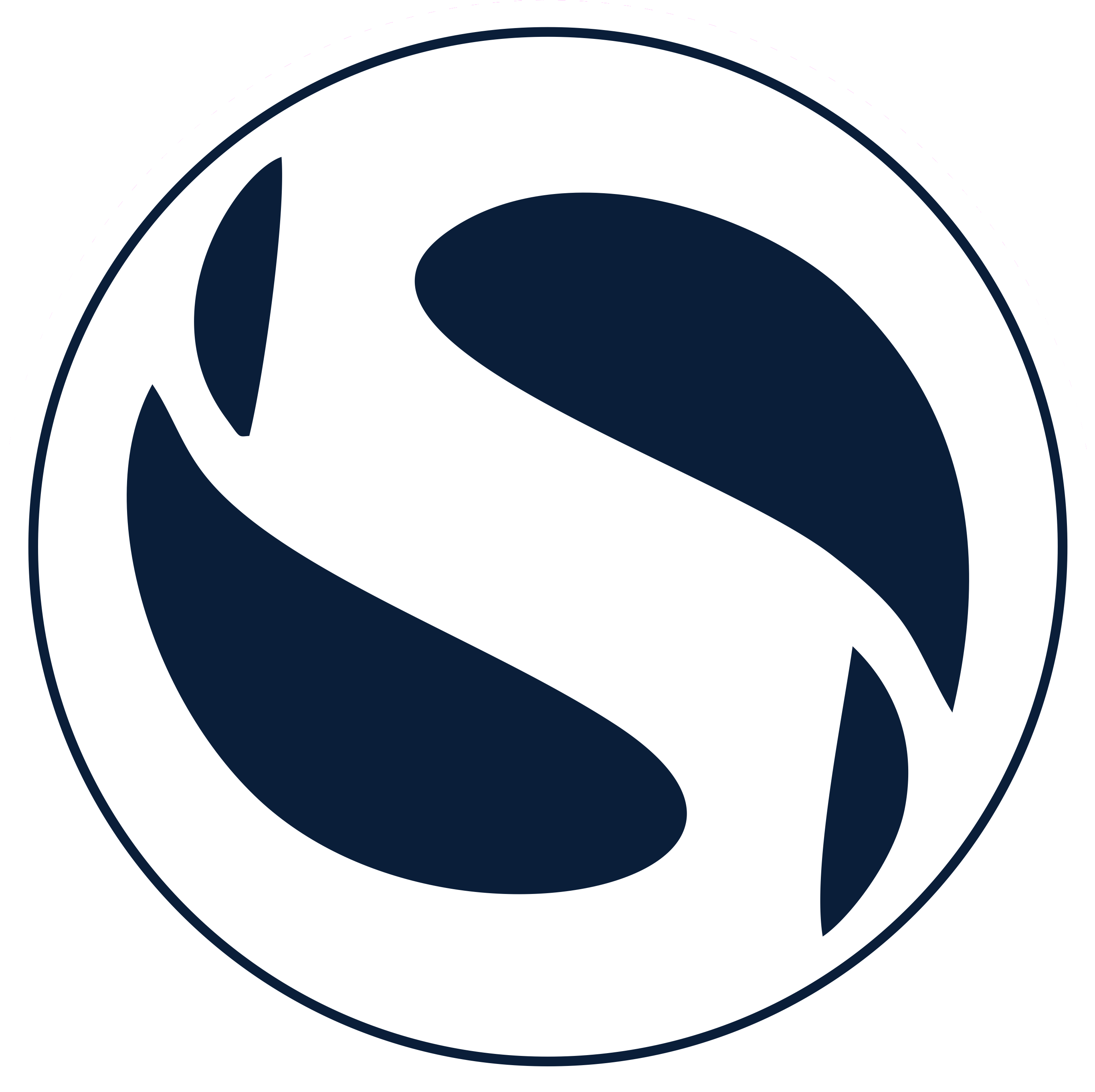
- Class symbol

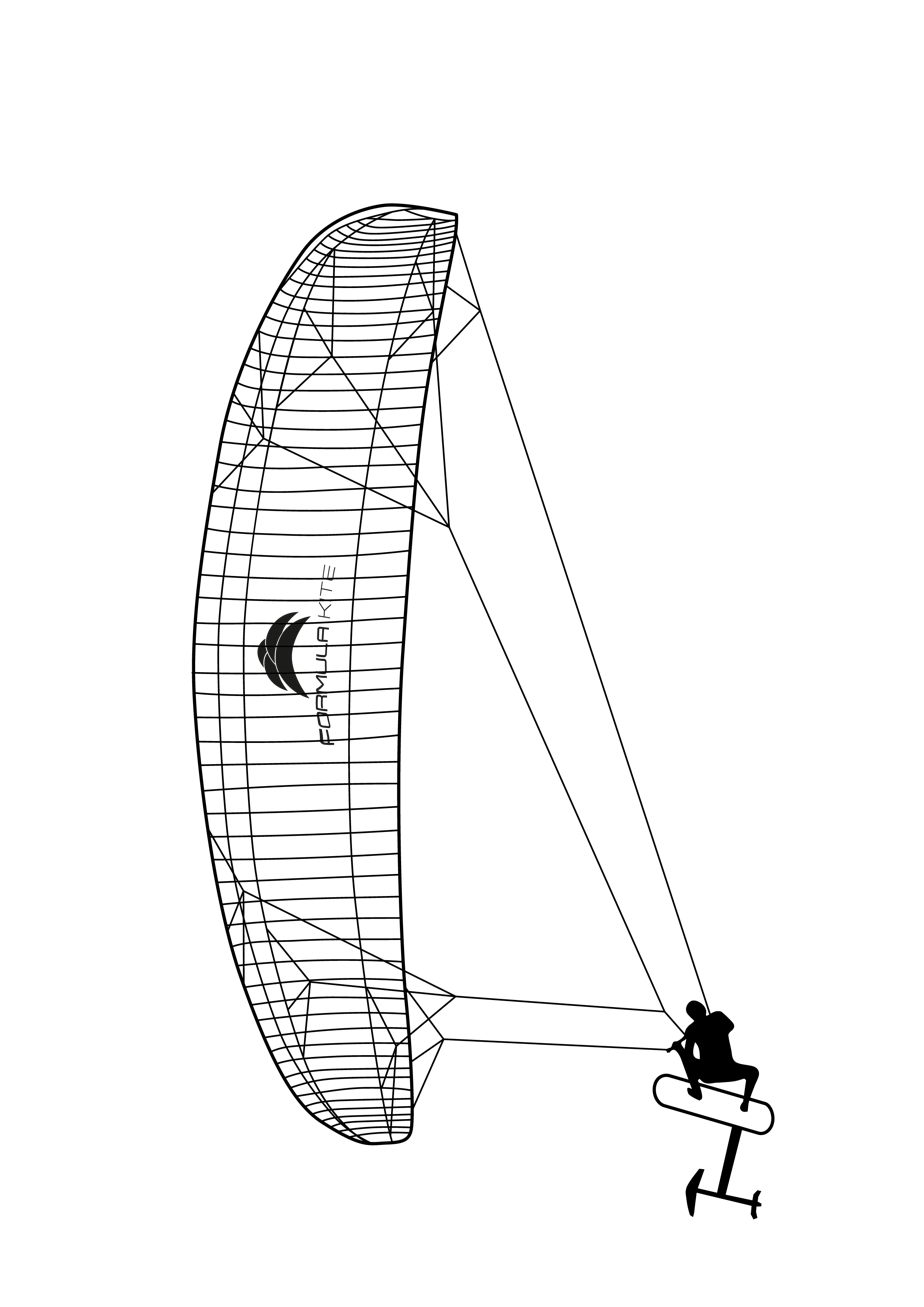
- Kitefoiling line art

Development
- Designer: Various

Boat
- Crew: 1

Hull
- Type: Kiteboarding
- Construction: Unrestricted
- Hull weight: Min 2,000 g (4.4 lb)
- LOA: Max 1,550 mm (5.09 ft)
- Beam: Max 500 mm (1.6 ft)

Sails
- Total sail area: Max 21 m^{2} (230 sq ft)for Men's; Max 19 m^{2} (200 sq ft)for Women's

Racing
- Class association: FK

Formula Kite is the kitesurfing class chosen by World Sailing for the 2024 Summer Olympics. The class features a foil kite and a board with a hydrofoil. The equipment is not one-design, but instead competitors use their choice of approved production equipment. The International Kiteboarding Association (IKA) manages the class. The class is for men and women.

== Events ==
=== Men's Olympics ===
Games	Location	Gold	Silver	Bronze
2024	Paris	Valentin Bontus (AUT)	Toni Vodisek (SLO)	Max Maeder (SGP)

=== Men's World Championship ===
Games	Location	Gold	Silver	Bronze
2009 Course
2010 Course		Adam Koch (GBR)	Damien LeRoy (USA)	Bruno Sroka (GBR)
2011 Course
2011 Slalom
2012
2013	Hainan, China	Florian Gruber (GER)	Johnny Heineken (USA)	Oliver Bridge (GBR)
2014	Istanbul, Turkey	Maxime Nocher (FRA)	Ricardo Andrea Leccese (ITA)	Oliver Bridge (GBR)
2015	Gizzeria, Italy	Maxime Nocher (FRA)	Oliver Bridge (GBR)	Blazej Ozog (POL)
2016	Weifang, China	Maxime Nocher (FRA)	Axel Mazella (FRA)	Oliver Bridge (GBR)
2017	Muscat, Oman	Nicolas Parlier (FRA)	Axel Mazella (FRA)	Oliver Bridge (GBR)
2018	Aarhus, Denmark	Nicolas Parlier (FRA)	Guy Bridge (GBR)	Maxime Nocher (FRA)
2019	Lake Garda, Italy	Nicolas Parlier (FRA)	Oliver Bridge (GBR)	Connor Bainbridge (GBR)
2020		CANCELLED COVID		
2021	Torregande, Italy	Théo de Ramecourt (FRA)	Axel Mazella (FRA)	Riccardo Pianosi (ITA)
2022	Poetto Beach, Italy	Toni Vodišek (SLO)	Max Maeder (SGP)	Axel Mazella (FRA)
2023	The Hague, Netherlands	Max Maeder (SGP)	Toni Vodišek (SLO)	Axel Mazella (FRA)
2024	Hyères, France	Max Maeder (SGP)	Riccardo Pianosi (ITA)	Valentin Bontus (AUT)
2025	Cagliari, Italy	Riccardo Pianosi (ITA)	Max Maeder (SGP)	Benoît Gomez (FRA)
2026	Viana do Castelo, Portugal	Max Maeder (SGP)	Gian Andrea Stragiotti (SUI)	Valentin Bontus (AUT)

=== Women's Olympics ===
Games	Location	Gold	Silver	Bronze
2024	Paris	Eleanor Aldridge (GBR)	Lauriane Nolot (FRA)	Annelous Lammerts (NED)

=== Women's World Championship ===
Games	Location	Gold	Silver	Bronze
2009 Course
2010 Course		Kari Schibevaag	Steph Bridge (GBR)	Kristin Boese
2011 Course
2011 Slalom
2012
2013	Hainan, China	Erika Heineken (USA)	Steph Bridge (GBR)	Elena Kalinina (RUS)
2014	Istanbul, Turkey	Steph Bridge (GBR)	Elena Kalinina (RUS)	Erika Heineken (USA)
2015	Gizzeria, Italy	Elena Kalinina (RUS)	Steph Bridge (GBR)	Anastasia Akopova (RUS)
2016	Weifang, China	Daniela Moroz (USA)	Elena Kalinina (RUS)	Steph Bridge (GBR)
2017	Muscat, Oman	Daniela Moroz (USA)	Elena Kalinina (RUS)	Alexia Fancelli (FRA)
2018	Aarhus, Denmark	Daniela Moroz (USA)	Elena Kalinina (RUS)	Alexia Fancelli (FRA)
2019	Lake Garda, Italy	Daniela Moroz (USA)	Elena Kalinina (RUS)	Breiana Whitehead (AUS)
2021	Torregande, Italy	Daniela Moroz (USA)	Ellie Aldridge (GBR)	Lauriane Nolot (FRA)
2022	Poetto Beach, Italy	Daniela Moroz (USA)	Lauriane Nolot (FRA)	Ellie Aldridge (GBR)
2023	The Hague, Netherlands	Lauriane Nolot (FRA)	Ellie Aldridge (GBR)	Lily Young (GBR)
2024	Hyères, France	Lauriane Nolot (FRA)	Ellie Aldridge (GBR)	Jessie Kampman (FRA)
2025	Cagliari, Italy	Jessie Kampman (NED)	Daniela Moroz (USA)	Lauriane Nolot (FRA)
2026	Viana do Castelo, Portugal	Lauriane Nolot (FRA)	Jessie Kampman (NED)	Elena Lengwiler (SUI)

== See also ==
- Windfoiling
