= 2023 Sailing World Championships – Men's Formula Kite =

Men's Formula Kite at the 2023 Sailing World Championships
- Venue: The Hague, the Netherlands
- Dates: 14–20 August
- Competitors: 84 from 43 nations

Medalists
| gold medal | Max Maeder | Singapore |
| silver medal | Toni Vodišek | Slovenia |
| bronze medal | Axel Mazella | France |

The men's Formula Kite competition at the 2023 Sailing World Championships was the men's kiteboarding event and was held in The Hague, the Netherlands, 14–20 August 2023. The entries were limited to 90 boards. The competitors participated in an opening series that was planned to 20 races, followed by a medal series. The medal series was planned for 19 August.

The competition served as a qualifying event for the 2024 Olympic sailing competition with 8 out of 20 national quota being distributed at the event.

== Summary ==
Toni Vodišek of Slovenia was the reigning world champion, having won the 2022 Formula Kite World Championships in Cagliari, while Axel Mazella of France had won the Paris 2024 Test Event the month before. In the Sailing World Cup, Max Maeder of Singapore had won the Trofeo Princesa Sofia, while Mazella had won the Semaine Olympique Française and the Allianz Regatta.

Maeder and Vodišek both opened with three race wins in different fleets. No wind limited the possibility to sail on 18 August.

From the opening series results, Vodišek and Maeder qualified directly to the final; Vodišek carrying two wins forward and Maeder carrying one. 16-year-old Maeder won the championship title by winning the medal series ahead of Vodišek.

With the final results, national quotas were awarded Singapore, Slovenia, Austria, Great Britain, Cyprus, China, Croatia and Brazil.

== Results ==
=== Opening series ===
Results of individual races
| Pos | Helmsman | Country | I | II | III | IV | V | VI | VII | VIII | IX | X | XI | XII | XIII | XIV | XV | XVI | Tot | Pts |
|---|---|---|---|---|---|---|---|---|---|---|---|---|---|---|---|---|---|---|---|---|
| 1 | Max Maeder | Singapore | 1 | 1 | 1 | 2 | 2 | 1 | 1 | 1 | 2 | 4 | 8^{†} | 2 | 9^{†} | 3 | 7^{†} | 2 | 47 | 23 |
| 2 | Toni Vodišek | Slovenia | 1 | 1 | 1 | 3 | 4^{†} | 1 | 1 | 2 | 1 | 2 | 1 | 1 | 11^{†} | 4 | 17^{†} | 3 | 54 | 22 |
| 3 | Axel Mazella | France | 16^{†} | 1 | 1 | 4 | 2 | 3 | 2 | 1 | 2 | 2 | 14 | 4 | 19^{†} | 7 | 4 | 20^{†} | 102 | 47 |
| 4 | Valentin Bontus | Austria | 5 | 2 | 3 | 3 | 4 | 2 | 14^{†} | 5 | 3 | 1 | 5 | 21^{†} | 6 | DSQ 26^{†} | 3 | 7 | 110 | 49 |
| 5 | Riccardo Pianosi | Italy | 1 | 4 | 2 | 1 | 5^{†} | 4 | 4 | 3 | 5 | 3 | 3 | 7^{†} | 7 | 12^{†} | 5 | 1 | 67 | 43 |
| 6 | Denis Taradin | Cyprus | 15^{†} | 7 | 3 | 1 | 3 | 1 | 7 | 9^{†} | 2 | 4 | 18^{†} | 9 | 2 | 1 | 2 | 6 | 89 | 48 |
| 7 | Huang Qibin | China | 6 | 12^{†} | 2 | 14^{†} | 3 | 4 | 4 | 2 | 6 | 6 | 4 | 3 | 4 | 9 | 1 | 18^{†} | 98 | 54 |
| 8 | Martin Dolenc | Croatia | 3 | 13^{†} | 9 | 4 | 1 | 5 | 1 | 6 | 3 | 7 | 2 | 6 | 22^{†} | 2 | 15^{†} | 10 | 109 | 59 |
| 9 | Bruno Lobo | Brazil | 2 | 6 | 5 | 6 | 16^{†} | 6 | 5 | 6 | 1 | 3 | 5 | 13^{†} | 3 | 8^{†} | 8 | 5 | 98 | 61 |
| 10 | Benoit Gomez | France | 3 | 4 | 2 | 4 | 3 | 2 | 2 | 1 | 5^{†} | 1 | 1 | 12 | 16^{†} | DSQ 26^{†} | 13 | 13 | 108 | 61 |
| 11 | Maks Żakowski | Poland | 2 | 10 | 4 | 2 | 1 | 4 | 26^{†} | 3 | 4 | 2 | 7 | 5 | 20^{†} | 22^{†} | 18 | 4 | 134 | 66 |
| 12 | Connor Bainbridge | Great Britain | 14^{†} | 3 | 4 | 2 | 5 | 7 | 11 | 3 | 1 | 5 | 5 | 8 | 10 | 15^{†} | 6 | 23^{†} | 122 | 70 |
| 13 | Lorenzo Boschetti | Italy | 5 | 2 | DSQ 29^{†} | 13 | 8 | 3 | 2 | 4 | 13 | 1 | 1 | RET 26^{†} | 1 | RDG 16.5 | 24^{†} | 15 | 163.5 | 84.5 |
| 14 | Florian Gruber | Germany | 3 | 5 | 8 | 7 | 16^{†} | 5 | 8 | 5 | 5 | 3 | 2 | 14 | 21^{†} | 16 | 19^{†} | 8 | 145 | 89 |
| 15 | Maxime Nocher | France | 8 | 6 | DSQ 29^{†} | 24^{†} | 9 | 2 | 6 | 2 | 4 | 7 | 7 | 17 | 5 | 10 | 9 | 25^{†} | 170 | 92 |
| 16 | Dor Zarka | Israel | 4 | 6 | 6 | 8 | 12 | 9 | 8 | 7 | 8 | 4 | 16^{†} | 10 | 14^{†} | 6 | 11 | 16^{†} | 145 | 99 |
| 17 | Zhang Haoran | China | 4 | 3 | 3 | 8 | UFD 29^{†} | 7 | 3 | 4 | 19 | 10 | 6 | DNF 26^{†} | 23^{†} | 5 | 10 | 17 | 177 | 99 |
| 18 | Jannis Maus | Germany | 11 | 2 | 10 | 1 | 1 | 5 | 3 | 7 | 8 | 12^{†} | 4 | 16 | 15 | 17 | 21^{†} | 21^{†} | 154 | 100 |
| 19 | Cameron Maramenidis | Greece | STP 13 | 4 | 13 | 5 | 15^{†} | 3 | 4 | 9 | 6 | 6 | 9 | 15^{†} | 8 | 14 | 22^{†} | 9 | 155 | 103 |
| 20 | Noah Runciman | United States | 9 | 25^{†} | 6 | 8 | 7 | 10 | 3 | 4 | 11 | 10 | 3 | 11 | 12^{†} | 11 | 14^{†} | 12 | 156 | 105 |
| 21 | Dvir Azulay | Israel | 5 | 16^{†} | 7 | 5 | 10 | 6 | 9 | 10 | 3 | 8 | 10 | 18^{†} | 18^{†} | 18 | 12 | 11 | 166 | 114 |
| 22 | Jan Marciniak | Poland | 2 | 5 | 4 | 7 | 6 | 11 | 6 | 8 | 7 | 5 | 24^{†} | 22^{†} | 25^{†} | 20 | 20 | 19 | 191 | 120 |
| 23 | Kai Calder | United States | 8 | 9 | 7 | 5 | 8 | 8 | 5 | 12^{†} | 10 | 8 | 4 | 19^{†} | 13 | 19 | 16 | 24^{†} | 175 | 120 |
| 24 | Sam Aben | Netherlands | 11 | 3 | 11 | 9 | 6 | 8 | 6 | UFD 29^{†} | 7 | 7 | 9 | 20^{†} | 17 | 13 | 23^{†} | 14 | 193 | 121 |
| 25 | Théo de Ramecourt | France | 6 | 8 | 8 | 6 | 7 | 6 | 5 | 8 | 4 | 9^{†} | 7 | 23 | 24^{†} | 21 | 25^{†} | 22 | 189 | 131 |
| 26 | Markus Edegran | United States | 7 | DSQ 29^{†} | 5 | 20^{†} | 2 | 7 | 11 | 18 | 14 | 10 | 3 | 4 | DNC 31^{†} | 6 | 4 | – | 171 | 91 |
| 27 | Tiger Tyson | Antigua and Barbuda | 9 | 15^{†} | 6 | 18^{†} | 8 | 12 | 9 | 5 | 9 | 8 | 8 | 1 | 2 | 18^{†} | 16 | – | 144 | 93 |
| 28 | Lukas Walton-Keim | New Zealand | 9 | 5 | 7 | 15^{†} | 4 | 10 | 12 | 10 | DNF 29^{†} | 13^{†} | 13 | 11 | 6 | 10 | 2 | – | 156 | 99 |
| 29 | Bruce Kessler | Switzerland | 4 | 11 | 9 | 9 | 14^{†} | 12^{†} | 12 | 8 | 9 | 11 | DNF 29^{†} | 10 | 12 | 8 | 5 | – | 163 | 108 |
| 30 | Zohar Haruvi | Israel | 8 | 8 | 12^{†} | 19^{†} | 9 | 11 | 7 | 12 | 12 | 5 | 8 | 15 | 16 | 4 | 20^{†} | – | 166 | 115 |
| 31 | Bernat Cortes | Spain | 10 | 10 | 9 | 19^{†} | 12 | 22^{†} | 10 | 11 | 7 | 12 | 14 | 14 | 5 | 1 | 25^{†} | – | 181 | 115 |
| 32 | Jan Voster | Germany | 19^{†} | 18^{†} | 16 | 3 | 13 | 14 | 15 | 13 | 14 | 19^{†} | 2 | 7 | 4 | 5 | 10 | – | 172 | 116 |
| 33 | Alejandro Climent | Spain | 12 | 13^{†} | 11 | 12 | 13 | 13 | 7 | 14^{†} | 13 | 14^{†} | 11 | 6 | 11 | 2 | 9 | – | 161 | 120 |
| 34 | Jis van Hees | Netherlands | 10 | 15^{†} | 10 | 7 | 5 | 14 | 12 | 7 | 11 | 11 | DNF 29^{†} | 18^{†} | 9 | 17 | 8 | – | 183 | 121 |
| 35 | Evan Heffernan | United States | 13 | 9 | 14 | 10 | 17^{†} | 13 | 8 | 10 | 16^{†} | 9 | 10 | 8 | 8 | 16^{†} | 11 | – | 172 | 123 |
| 36 | Nicolas Parlier | France | 7 | 11 | 12 | 15 | 6 | 8 | 11 | 12 | 17^{†} | 13 | 16^{†} | 9 | 18^{†} | 7 | 12 | – | 174 | 123 |
| 37 | Mario Calbucci | Italy | 15 | 12 | 14 | 17^{†} | 9 | 9 | 13 | 6 | 12 | 6 | DNF 29^{†} | 5 | 13 | 13 | 18^{†} | – | 191 | 127 |
| 38 | Lucas Pes Fonseca | Brazil | 6 | 8 | 26^{†} | 12 | 16 | 16 | 17 | 14 | 11 | 11 | UFD 29^{†} | 2 | 1 | 14 | DNF 31^{†} | – | 214 | 128 |
| 39 | Vojtěch Koška | Czech Republic | 13 | 9 | 15 | 6 | 11 | 10 | 25 | 11 | DNF 29^{†} | DNC 29^{†} | 10 | 12 | 7 | 3 | 27^{†} | – | 217 | 132 |
| 40 | Jean de Falbaire | Mauritius | 7 | 7 | 10 | 10 | 15 | 13 | 13 | 11 | 10 | DNF 29^{†} | 19^{†} | 20 | 28^{†} | 11 | 7 | – | 210 | 134 |
| 41 | Deury Corniel | Dominican Republic | 19^{†} | 17 | 21^{†} | 16 | 11 | 11 | 10 | 19^{†} | 16 | 13 | 6 | 3 | 17 | 19 | 1 | – | 199 | 140 |
| 42 | Sven van de Kamp | Netherlands | 14 | 17 | 13 | 11 | 7 | 9 | 9 | UFD 29^{†} | 16 | 16 | DNF 29^{†} | 16 | 3 | 23 | 24^{†} | – | 236 | 154 |
| 43 | Mattia Maini | Great Britain | 14 | DNF 29^{†} | 14 | 25^{†} | 13 | 14 | 15 | 14 | 13 | 17 | 12 | 27^{†} | 10 | 21 | 3 | – | 241 | 160 |
| 44 | Scott Whitehead | Australia | 21 | RET 29^{†} | 8 | 24^{†} | 24 | 12 | 14 | 13 | 12 | UFD 29^{†} | 9 | 13 | 15 | 12 | 13 | – | 248 | 166 |
| 45 | Yael Paz | Israel | 11 | 14 | 21^{†} | 14 | 10 | 19 | DSQ 29^{†} | 13 | 6 | 17 | 6 | 25^{†} | 23 | 20 | 15 | – | 243 | 168 |
| 46 | Xantos Villegas | Mexico | 16 | 19^{†} | 16 | 12 | 14 | 15 | 14 | 20^{†} | 17 | 16 | 11 | 28^{†} | 25 | 9 | 6 | – | 238 | 171 |
| 47 | Jakub Jurkowski | Poland | 16 | 7 | 17 | 9 | 18 | 23^{†} | 19^{†} | 17 | 15 | 17 | STP 18 | 24^{†} | 14 | 15 | 17 | – | 246 | 180 |
| 48 | Tomás Pires de Lima | Portugal | 13 | 15 | 13 | 18^{†} | 12 | 15 | 10 | 18^{†} | 15 | 18 | 17 | DNF 31^{†} | 19 | 24 | 19 | – | 257 | 190 |
| 49 | Joseph Jonathan Weston | Thailand | DPI 19 | DNC 29^{†} | 5 | 17 | 10 | DSQ 29^{†} | 16 | 17 | 9 | 14 | 15 | 21 | 22 | DNF 31^{†} | 26 | – | 280 | 191 |
| 50 | Jacobo Espi | Spain | 15 | 12 | 15 | 20^{†} | 19^{†} | 18 | 18 | 9 | 14 | 15 | 19 | DNF 31^{†} | 27 | 22 | 14 | – | 268 | 198 |
| 51 | Roderick Pijls | Netherlands | DNF 29^{†} | 10 | 17 | 13 | 19^{†} | 18 | 15 | 19 | 15 | 15 | 16 | 17 | 24 | 27^{†} | 23 | – | 277 | 202 |
| 52 | Gian Andrea Stragiotti | Switzerland | 20^{†} | 18 | 18 | 11 | 15 | 17 | 17 | 16 | 18 | 19^{†} | 14 | 26^{†} | 20 | 25 | 21 | – | 275 | 210 |
| 53 | Armağan Ersolak | Turkey | 20 | 20 | 12 | 11 | 11 | 16 | 21^{†} | 16 | 21 | 9 | DNF 29^{†} | 19 | 26 | 29 | DNC 31^{†} | – | 291 | 210 |
| 54 | Marcin Kroczak | Switzerland | 17 | 11 | 20 | 10 | UFD 29^{†} | 17 | 20 | 20 | DNF 29^{†} | DNC 29^{†} | 13 | 23 | 21 | 26 | 22 | – | 307 | 220 |
| 55 | Daniel Harris | Great Britain | 12 | 13 | 22^{†} | 16 | 17 | 19^{†} | 18 | 15 | 19 | 16 | 15 | 22 | 29 | 28 | DNF 31^{†} | – | 292 | 220 |
| 56 | Oscar Timm | Australia | 23^{†} | 14 | 19^{†} | 18 | 17 | 19 | 17 | 24^{†} | 18 | 15 | 13 | 2 | 3 | 5 | 3 | – | 210 | 144 |
| 57 | Arthur Brown | Great Britain | 21 | 26^{†} | 15 | 20 | 18 | 15 | 18 | 22^{†} | 10 | 14 | 21 | UFD 30^{†} | 2 | 3 | 4 | – | 239 | 161 |
| 58 | Carl Beckett | Denmark | 22^{†} | 19 | 16 | 22^{†} | 21 | 16 | 13 | 15 | 17 | 20 | 20 | 1 | 1 | 2 | DCT 30^{†} | – | 235 | 161 |
| 59 | Alexander Bachev | Bulgaria | STP 19 | 17 | 19 | 15 | 21^{†} | 18 | 19 | 16 | 20 | 22^{†} | 24^{†} | 8 | 5 | 6 | 2 | – | 231 | 164 |
| 60 | Michał Wojciechowski | Poland | 17 | 18 | 11 | 19 | 18 | 17 | 21^{†} | UFD 29^{†} | 18 | 21^{†} | 21 | 5 | 7 | 4 | 9 | – | 235 | 164 |
| 61 | Pedro Afonso Rodrigues | Portugal | 17 | 21 | DNF 29^{†} | 13 | 22^{†} | 20 | 20 | 20 | 19 | 26^{†} | 15 | 6 | 12 | 10 | 7 | – | 257 | 180 |
| 62 | Karl Maeder | Switzerland | DNF 29^{†} | 19 | 19 | 22^{†} | 20 | 21^{†} | 21 | STP 20 | 20 | 20 | 11 | 20 | 21 | 1 | 1 | – | 265 | 193 |
| 63 | Adam Farrington | Great Britain | 22^{†} | 21 | 22 | 26^{†} | 20 | 20 | 22 | 21 | 21 | 23^{†} | 20 | 4 | 9 | 7 | 6 | – | 264 | 193 |
| 64 | Gilberto Di Fiore | Venezuela | 20 | 14 | 18 | 14 | 26^{†} | 21 | 24^{†} | 28^{†} | 22 | 20 | 19 | 15 | 4 | 16 | 10 | – | 271 | 193 |
| 65 | James Johnsen | Denmark | 21 | 20 | 20 | 16 | 24^{†} | 21 | 23^{†} | 18 | 20 | 18 | DNF 29^{†} | 10 | 11 | 11 | 11 | – | 273 | 197 |
| 66 | Logan Sutherland | Canada | 19 | 16 | 24^{†} | 21 | 19 | 22 | 20 | 22 | 23 | UFD 29^{†} | 18 | 7 | 6 | 9 | DNF 30^{†} | – | 285 | 202 |
| 67 | Victor Bolaños | Colombia | 10 | 28 | DNF 29^{†} | DNF 29^{†} | 25 | 26 | 16 | 15 | 8 | 18 | 17 | DNC 30^{†} | 26 | 25 | 5 | – | 307 | 219 |
| 68 | Sarun Rupchom | Thailand | RET 29^{†} | DNC 29^{†} | DNC 29^{†} | DNC 29 | 20 | 20 | 19 | 21 | 23 | 24 | 23 | 17 | 8 | 8 | 8 | – | 307 | 220 |
| 69 | James Morrin | Canada | 25^{†} | 16 | 24 | 17 | 22 | 23 | 23 | 25^{†} | 25^{†} | 22 | 12 | 9 | 22 | 22 | 12 | – | 299 | 224 |
| 70 | Casey Brown | United States | DNF 29^{†} | RDG 18.7 | RDG 20.6 | RDG 20.6 | 24 | 22 | 16 | 21 | DNF 29^{†} | 12 | 12 | 3 | DNF 30^{†} | DNF 30 | DNF 30 | – | 317.9 | 229.9 |
| 71 | Jindřich Houštěk | Czech Republic | STP 23 | 23 | 22 | 21 | 22 | 24^{†} | 25^{†} | 24^{†} | 23 | 24 | 22 | 12 | 15 | 15 | 14 | – | 309 | 236 |
| 72 | Federico Aguilar | Argentina | 26^{†} | 21 | 18 | 23 | 21 | 25 | 25 | 23 | 22 | 23 | DNC 29^{†} | 11 | 10 | DNC 30^{†} | 17 | – | 324 | 239 |
| 73 | Hiro Karamon | Japan | 25^{†} | 22 | 23 | 25 | 23 | 23 | 26^{†} | 23 | 21 | 19 | 21 | 16 | 17 | 14 | DNF 30^{†} | – | 328 | 247 |
| 74 | Siriwit Prangsri | Thailand | DPI 24^{†} | 24^{†} | 20 | 24^{†} | 23 | 24 | 22 | 24 | 22 | 23 | 18 | 14 | 19 | 18 | 21 | – | 320 | 248 |
| 75 | Cheol Cho-su | South Korea | 27^{†} | 23 | 26 | 22 | UFD 29^{†} | 24 | 22 | 27^{†} | 24 | 25 | 22 | 23 | 14 | 12 | 16 | – | 336 | 253 |
| 76 | Vasileios Livas | Greece | 26 | 25 | 23 | 21 | 23 | 27^{†} | 27^{†} | 26 | 24 | 21 | 23 | 13 | 13 | 17 | DNF 30^{†} | – | 339 | 255 |
| 77 | Po Chak Leung | Hong Kong | DNF 29^{†} | 24 | 25 | 23 | 25.5^{†} | 26^{†} | 24 | 23 | 25 | 21 | 23 | 18 | 18 | 21 | 13 | – | 338.5 | 258 |
| 78 | J. J. Rice | Tonga | 24 | 23 | 25 | 26^{†} | 25.5 | 25 | 26^{†} | 22 | 24 | 24 | 22 | DNF 30^{†} | 16 | 13 | 15 | – | 340.5 | 258.5 |
| 79 | Chitresh Tatha | India | 23 | 24 | 23 | 23 | DNC 29^{†} | 25^{†} | 24 | 25 | DNF 29^{†} | 25 | 20 | 19 | 20 | 20 | 19 | – | 348 | 265 |
| 80 | André Olsson | Sweden | 24 | 22 | 21 | 25 | UFD 29^{†} | 27^{†} | 23 | 25 | 26^{†} | 22 | 25 | 21 | 23 | 19 | 20 | – | 352 | 270 |
| 81 | Valentyn Sudak | Ukraine | STP 26^{†} | 25 | 24 | 26^{†} | 25 | 26 | 27^{†} | 26 | 25 | 26 | 25 | 22 | 24 | 24 | 18 | – | 369 | 290 |
| 82 | Ejder Ginyol | Turkey | 24 | 22 | DNF 29^{†} | DNF 29^{†} | 14 | 28 | 28 | 17 | DNF 29 | DNF 29 | DNF 29 | DNC 30^{†} | DNC 30 | DNC 30 | DNF 30 | – | 398 | 310 |
| 83 | Daan Baute | Belgium | 18 | 20 | 17 | DNF 29^{†} | DNC 29^{†} | DNF 29 | DNF 29 | DNC 29 | DNC 29 | DNC 29 | DNF 29 | DNC 30^{†} | DNC 30 | DNC 30 | DNF 30 | – | 407 | 319 |
| 84 | Tomas Juška | Lithuania | STP 28 | 27 | DNF 29^{†} | DNF 29^{†} | 26 | 27 | 28 | 27 | DNF 29 | DNC 29 | DNF 29 | 24 | 25 | 23 | DNF 30^{†} | – | 410 | 322 |

Scoring system: low-point system; Source:
Legend: DCT – Disqualified after causing a tangle in an incident; DNC – Did not come to the starting area; DNF – Did not finish; DPI – Discretionary penalty imposed; DSQ – Disqualified; RDG – Redress given; RET – Retired; STP – Standard penalty imposed; UFD – "U" flag disqualification; † – Discarded race not counted in the overall result;

=== Medal series ===
==== Semi-final A ====
Results of individual races
| Pos | Crew | Country | CF | I | II |
|---|---|---|---|---|---|
| 1 | Valentin Bontus | Austria | W | W | W |
| 2 | Riccardo Pianosi | Italy | WW | 3 | 2 |
| 3 | Huang Qibin | China | | 2 | 3 |
| 4 | Benoit Gomez | France | | 4 | 4 |

Scoring system: most wins; Source:
Legend: – Advance to final;

==== Semi-final B ====
Results of individual races
| Pos | Crew | Country | CF | I | II |
|---|---|---|---|---|---|
| 1 | Axel Mazella | France | WW | 3 | W |
| 2 | Denis Taradin | Cyprus | W | W | 3 |
| 3 | Martin Dolenc | Croatia | | 2 | 2 |
| 4 | Bruno Lobo | Brazil | | 4 | 4 |

Scoring system: most wins; Source:
Legend: – Advance to final;

==== Final ====
Results of individual races
| Pos | Crew | Country | CF | I | II | III |
|---|---|---|---|---|---|---|
| Gold medal | Max Maeder | Singapore | W | W | 2 | W |
| Silver medal | Toni Vodišek | Slovenia | WW | 4 | 3 | RET 5 |
| Bronze medal | Axel Mazella | France | | 3 | W | 3 |
| 4 | Valentin Bontus | Austria | | 2 | 4 | 2 |

Scoring system: most wins; Source:
Legend: RET – Retired;
