= 2021 Youth Sailing World Championships – Boy's Formula Kite =

Boy's Formula Kite at the 2021 Youth Sailing World Championships
- Venue: Al-Mussanah, Oman
- Dates: 11–18 December
- Competitors: 16 from 16 nations

Medalists
gold medal	Max Maeder	Singapore
silver medal	Riccardo Pianosi	Italy
bronze medal	Mikhail Novikov	Russia

The boy's Formula Kite competition at the 2021 Youth Sailing World Championships took place between December 11 and 18 2021. 10 sailors from 10 nations were due to compete. Maximilian Maeder of Singapore won the event.

== Results ==
Pos	Helm	Country	R1	R2	R3	R4	R5	R6	R7	R8	R9	R10	R11	R12	R13	R14	R15	R16	R17	R18	Total	Nett
1	Maximilian Maeder	Singapore	(17.0 DNF)	(4.0)	1.0	1.0	2.0	1.0	1.0	(3.0)	1.0	1.0	1.0	1.0	1.0	1.0	1.0	1.0	1.0	1.0	40.0	16.0
2	Riccardo Pianosi	Italy	1.0	1.0	2.0	3.0	3.0	2.0	2.0	1.0	(17.0 UFD)	2.0	2.0	(17.0 UFD)	2.0	2.0	2.0	(4.0)	3.0	2.0	68.0	30.0
3	Mikhail Novikov	Russia	2.0	2.0	(3.0)	2.0	1.0	(3.0)	3.0	2.0	2.0	3.0	3.0	2.0	(17.0 UFD)	3.0	3.0	2.0	2.0	3.0	58.0	35.0
4	Jakub Jurkowski	Poland	3.0	3.0	4.0	4.0	(8.0)	4.0	6.0	(8.0)	3.0	4.0	4.0	3.0	4.0	5.0	(7.0)	3.0	7.0	4.0	84.0	61.0
5	Ulysse Dereeper	France	(17.0 DNF)	12.0	7.0	(15.0)	4.0	6.0	4.0	5.0	4.0	5.0	5.0	5.0	(17.0 UFD)	7.0	6.0	5.0	4.0	5.0	133.0	84.0
6	Jis Ton Peet van Hees	Netherlands	6.0	5.0	6.0	6.0	5.0	5.0	(8.0)	(9.0)	7.0	(8.0)	6.0	6.0	5.0	6.0	4.0	6.0	6.0	6.0	110.0	85.0
7	Jan Voster	Germany	4.0	6.0	5.0	5.0	(17.0 DNF)	7.0	(17.0 DNS)	4.0	10.0	(11.0)	8.0	4.0	3.0	4.0	5.0	8.0	8.0	7.0	133.0	88.0
8	Francisco Peiro Mora	Spain	8.0	7.0	(10.0)	(11.0)	7.0	8.0	5.0	(12.0)	8.0	10.0	7.0	7.0	6.0	8.0	9.0	9.0	9.0	8.0	149.0	116.0
9	Noah Zittrer	United States	5.0	10.0	8.0	10.0	6.0	9.0	(11.0)	6.0	5.0	9.0	11.0	8.0	8.0	(12.0)	(17.0 DNF)	11.0	11.0	10.0	167.0	127.0
10	Vojta Koska	Czech Republic	10.0	9.0	(11.0)	9.0	10.0	11.0	7.0	10.0	6.0	6.0	9.0	9.0	7.0	10.0	11.0	(14.0)	5.0	(12.0)	166.0	129.0
11	Derin Cem Baba	Turkey	9.0	(11.0)	9.0	7.0	9.0	10.0	9.0	7.0	11.0	(12.0)	10.0	11.0	9.0	9.0	8.0	7.0	(17.0 DNF)	11.0	176.0	136.0
12	Adam Farrington	United Kingdom	7.0	8.0	(17.0 DNF)	8.0	(17.0 DNF)	(14.0)	10.0	11.0	9.0	7.0	12.0	10.0	10.0	11.0	10.0	10.0	10.0	9.0	190.0	142.0
13	Hiro Karamon	Japan	12.0	13.0	12.0	(17.0 DNF)	11.0	13.0	12.0	13.0	13.0	13.0	(14.0)	(14.0)	12.0	13.0	12.0	12.0	13.0	13.0	232.0	187.0
14	Yoav Barzilay	Israel	11.0	(14.0)	14.0	13.0	12.0	12.0	14.0	(17.0 RET)	12.0	14.0	13.0	12.0	11.0	14.0	(17.0 DNS)	13.0	12.0	14.0	239.0	191.0
15	Rodrigo Morais	Brazil	(17.0 DNF)	15.0	13.0	12.0	(17.0 DSQ)	15.0	13.0	14.0	(17.0 UFD)	15.0	17.0 DNS	13.0	17.0 DNF	15.0	13.0	15.0	14.0	15.0	267.0	216.0
16	Tayne Steven	Canada	(17.0 NSC)	16.0	15.0	14.0	13.0	16.0	15.0	(17.0 RET)	14.0	16.0	15.0	15.0	(17.0 DNF)	16.0	14.0	16.0	15.0	16.0	277.0	226.0
