= Sailing at the 2018 Summer Youth Olympics – Boys' IKA Twin Tip Racing =

Boys' IKA Twin Tip Racing at the III Summer Youth Olympic Games
- Venue: Club Náutico San Isidro
- Dates: 9–14 October
- Competitors: 12 from 12 nations

Medalists
1st place, gold medalist(s)		Deury Corniel	Dominican Republic
2nd place, silver medalist(s)		Christian Tio	Philippines
2nd place, silver medalist(s)		Toni Vodišek	Slovenia

The Boys' IKA Twin Tip Racing class competition at the 2018 Summer Youth Olympics took place from October 7 to 13 at the Club Náutico San Isidro in Buenos Aires.

== Medalists ==
Gold	Deury Corniel; Dominican Republic
Silver	Christian Tio; Philippines
Silver	Toni Vodišek; Slovenia

== Results ==
Rank	Athlete	Race							Net Points
Rank	Athlete	1	2	3	4	5	6	M	Net Points
1st place, gold medalist(s)	Deury Corniel (DOM)	1	1	1	~~6~~	6	1	1	16
2nd place, silver medalist(s)	Christian Tio (PHI)	2	5	8	3	~~8~~	3	2	29
2nd place, silver medalist(s)	Toni Vodišek (SLO)	3	~~11~~	10	4	1	2	2	31
4	Kameron Maramenidis (USA)	4	2	2	1		5	4	21
5	Maxime Chabloz (SUI)	~~12~~	9	9	5	2	7	5	23
6	Benoît Gomez (FRA)	~~6~~	5.2	6	6	3	4	6	31.2
7	Tiger Tyson (ANT)	9	4	3	2	~~9~~	6	7	33
8	Gerónimo Lutteral (ARG)	~~10~~	3	7	10	4	10	8	24
9	Manoel dos Santos Neto (BRA)	6	8	4	8	6	~~12~~		44
10	Martin Dolenc (CRO)	8	10	6	~~12~~	10	8		54
11	Jonas Ouahmid (MAR)	~~12~~	7	12	11	12	9		62
12	Mani Bisschops (AUS)	7	~~12~~	11	9	11	12		62
