= 2021 Youth Sailing World Championships – Nacra 15 =

Youth sailing event in Oman

Nacra 15 at the 2021 Youth Sailing World Championships
- Venue: Al-Musannah, Oman
- Dates: 11–18 December 2021

Medalists
gold medal	Thomas Proust; Eloïse Clabon	France
silver medal	Kay Brunsvold; Cooper Delbridge	United States
bronze medal	Axel Grandjean; Noémie Fehlmann	Switzerland

The Nacra 15 competition at the 2021 Youth Sailing World Championships took place from 11 to 18 December. Thomas Proust and Eloïse Clabon of France won the event after a match race for the title against the American crew of Kay Brunsvold and Cooper Delbridge. Axel Grandjean and Noémie Fehlmann of Switzerland were third.

== Results ==
Pos	Helm	Crew	Country	R1	R2	R3	R4	R5	R6	R7	R8	R9	R10	R11	R12	R13	Total	Nett
1	Thomas Proust	Eloïse Clabon	France	1	1	4	1	(6)	(6)	3	2	4	1	4	3	2	38	26
2	Kay Brunsvold	Cooper Delbridge	United States	3	(12 UFD)	7	4	1	3	2	1	1	3	2	4	(10)	53	31
3	Axel Grandjean	Noémie Fehlmann	Switzerland	2	4	3	3	4	5	(7)	3	2	4	(6)	2	5	50	37
4	Olivier Jaquet	Femme Rixt Rijk	Netherlands	4	6	1	(7)	2	1	5	4	3	5	5	(10)	3	56	39
5	Kwinten Borghijs	Lieselotte Borghijs	Belgium	6	2	5	6	3	(7)	1	5	(10)	2	1	5	6	59	42
6	Max Rondeau Gomez	Mar Garcia Alves	Spain	5	5	2	2	(7)	2	4	7	7	(8)	3	6	1	59	44
7	Roberto Cardoso	Julia Ollivier	Brazil	(9)	9	6	8	(10)	8	9	6	5	6	7	1	4	88	69
8	Bona Giorgio	Isotta Poggi	Italy	7	3	8	5	8	9	6	8	8	(11)	9	(11)	7	100	78
9	Leonard Paul Henry Beyer	Zoe Coers	Germany	8	7	(10)	9	5	4	8	(12 UFD)	6	9	8	7	8	101	79
10	Jasmine Williams	Alfie Cogger	United Kingdom	(10)	8	9	(10)	9	10	10	9	9	7	10	8	9	118	98
11	Maya Heidenreich	Noah Adler	Canada	(11)	10	11	(12 DNF)	11	11	11	10	11	10	11	9	11	139	116
