= Sailing at the 2024 Summer Olympics – Men's Formula Kite =

Men's Formula Kite at the Games of the XXXIII Olympiad
- Venues: Marseille Marina
- Dates: 4–9 August 2024
- Competitors: 20 from 20 nations

Medalists
1st place, gold medalist(s)		Valentin Bontus	Austria
2nd place, silver medalist(s)		Toni Vodišek	Slovenia
3rd place, bronze medalist(s)		Maximilian Maeder	Singapore

The Men's Formula Kite is a sailing event part of the Sailing at the 2024 Summer Olympics program in Marseille and takes place between 4–9 August 2024. It is the first appearance of men's kiteboarding in the Olympic games. 20 sailors from 20 countries competed in the event.

The event began with up to 16 preliminary races in the opening series across four days. The top 10 competitors moved on to the medal series; the top two competitors from the opening series advanced directly to the final, while positions 3–10 moved to the semifinal. The eight competitors in the semifinals were split into two groups of equal strength with a goal of reaching three race victories. The top sailors in each split started the semifinals with two race victories credited, while the second-ranked sailors started with one race victory. The winner of each semifinal moved on to the final.

In the final, the goal was to reach three race victories. The highest ranked sailor from the opening series started the final with two race victories, while the second-ranked sailor started with one race victory.

== Schedule ==
Sun 4 Aug	Mon 5 Aug	Tue 6 Aug	Wed 7 Aug	Thu 8 Aug	Fri 9 Aug
Race 1 Race 2 Race 3 Race 4	Race 5	Race 6 Race 7	~~Race 8~~; Cancelled	Semifinals; Final	Final

== Preliminary races ==
=== Results ===
Official results (after race 7). Races 8 to 16 were cancelled due to inadequate wind speeds.

Top 2 = Final

3 to 10 = Semifinal

Results of individual races
Pos	Helmsman	Country	I	II	III	IV	V	VI	VII	VIII	IX	X	XI	XII	XIII	XIV	XV	XVI	Tot	Pts
1	Toni Vodišek	Slovenia	2	5	1	3	10^{†}	1	12^{†}	-	-	-	-	-	-	-	-	-	34	12
2	Maximilian Maeder	Singapore	5	1	2	21^{†} DNF	3	10^{†}	4	-	-	-	-	-	-	-	-	-	46	15
3	Riccardo Pianosi	Italy	10^{†}	6	8	14^{†}	1	4	1	-	-	-	-	-	-	-	-	-	44	20
4	Valentin Bontus	Austria	1	2	5	8	4	21^{†} DSQ	20^{†}	-	-	-	-	-	-	-	-	-	61	20
5	Jannis Maus	Germany	8	9^{†}	11^{†}	2	2	7	2	-	-	-	-	-	-	-	-	-	41	21
6	Axel Mazella	France	7	13^{†}	9^{†}	1	5	2	7	-	-	-	-	-	-	-	-	-	44	22
7	Bruno Lobo	Brazil	3	7	10^{†}	4	15^{†}	9	5	-	-	-	-	-	-	-	-	-	53	28
8	Connor Bainbridge	Great Britain	4	8	3	7	7	11^{†}	11^{†}	-	-	-	-	-	-	-	-	-	51	29
9	Markus Edegran	United States	13^{†}	12	7	16^{†}	6	3	3	-	-	-	-	-	-	-	-	-	60	31
10	Huang Qibin	China	6	16^{†}	4	5	14^{†}	13	6	-	-	-	-	-	-	-	-	-	64	34
11	Cameron Maramenides	Greece	9	10	6	12^{†}	8	6	14^{†}	-	-	-	-	-	-	-	-	-	65	39
12	Denis Taradin	Cyprus	11	4	12	6	16^{†}	16	19^{†}	-	-	-	-	-	-	-	-	-	84	49
13	Dor Zarka	Israel	15	3	21^{†} DSQ	9	12	21^{†} UFD	13	-	-	-	-	-	-	-	-	-	94	52
14	Martin Dolenc	Croatia	14^{†}	14	18^{†}	13	13	5	8	-	-	-	-	-	-	-	-	-	85	53
15	Lukas Walton-Keim	New Zealand	12	18^{†}	13	10	17	8	18^{†}	-	-	-	-	-	-	-	-	-	96	60
16	Maks Żakowski	Poland	21^{†} UFD	11	14	15^{†}	11	14	10	-	-	-	-	-	-	-	-	-	96	60
17	Tiger Tyson	Antigua and Barbuda	16	19^{†}	19^{†}	17	9	18	9	-	-	-	-	-	-	-	-	-	107	69
18	Joseph Weston	Thailand	19^{†}	17	16	11	19^{†}	17	17	-	-	-	-	-	-	-	-	-	116	78
19	Jean de Falbaire	Mauritius	17	15	15	21^{†} RET	21^{†} DPI	15	16	-	-	-	-	-	-	-	-	-	120	78
20	Victor Bolaños	Colombia	18^{†}	20^{†}	17	18	18	12	15	-	-	-	-	-	-	-	-	-	118	80

Scoring system: low-point system;
Legend: – Qualified for medal race(s); BFD – Black flag disqualification; DNF – Did not finish; DNS – Did not start; DPI – Discretionary penalty imposed; DSQ – Disqualified; OCS – On the course side of the starting line; RDG – Redress given; RET – Retired; UFD – "U" flag disqualification; † – Discarded race not counted in the overall result;

== Medal series ==
=== Semifinals ===
==== Semifinal A ====
Rank	Helmsman	Nation	Earned Wins	Race 1	Race 2	Race 3	Race 4	Race 5	Race 6	Total wins	Notes
1	Riccardo Pianosi	Italy	2	2	1	—				3	Advanced to Finals
2	Axel Mazella	France	1	3	2	—				1	
3	Bruno Lobo	Brazil	0	1	3	—				1	
4	Huang Qibin	China	0	4	4 SCP	—				0	

- SCP = Scoring Penalty

==== Semifinal B ====
Rank	Helmsman	Nation	Earned Wins	Race 1	Race 2	Race 3	Race 4	Race 5	Race 6	Total wins	Notes
1	Valentin Bontus	Austria	2	1	—					3	Advanced to Finals
2	Jannis Maus	Germany	1	2	—					1	
3	Connor Bainbridge	Great Britain	0	3	—					0	
4	Markus Edegran	United States	0	4	—					0	

=== Finals ===
The Finals began on 8 August. One race was completed, but inadequate winds postponed remaining races until 9 August.

Rank	Helmsman	Nation	Earned Wins	Race 1	Race 2	Race 3	Race 4	Race 5	Race 6	Total wins
1st place, gold medalist(s)	Valentin Bontus	Austria	0	1	1	1	—			3
2nd place, silver medalist(s)	Toni Vodišek	Slovenia	2	4 SCP	4 DPI	4	—			2
3rd place, bronze medalist(s)	Maximilian Maeder	Singapore	1	2	2	3	—			1
4	Riccardo Pianosi	Italy	0	3	3	2	—			0

- DPI = Discretionary penalty imposed
- SCP = Scoring Penalty
