= 2021 Youth Sailing World Championships – Boy's 29er =

Boy's 29er at the 2021 Youth Sailing World Championships
- Venue: Al-Mussanah, Oman
- Dates: 11–18 December
- Competitors: 48 from 24 nations

Medalists
gold medal	Hugo Revil; Karl Devaux	France
silver medal	Mateo Codoñer Alemany; Simon Codoñer Alemany	Spain
bronze medal	Ian Nyenhuis; Noah Nyenhuis	United States

The boy's 29er competition at the 2021 Youth Sailing World Championships took place between December 11 and 18 2021. 48 sailors from 24 nations were due to compete. Hugo Revil and Karl Devaux of France won the event.

== Results ==
Rank	Helm	Crew	Country	R1	R2	R3	R4	R5	R6	R7	R8	R9	R10	R11	R12	R13	Total	Nett
1	Hugo Revil	Karl Devaux	France	3.0	3.0	3.0	4.0	5.0	4.0	10.0	2.0	4.0	(11.0)	(11.0)	1.0	7.0	68.0	46.0
2	Mateo Codoñer Alemany	Simon Codoñer Alemany	Spain	(18.0)	6.0	1.0	2.0	8.0	5.0	7.0 SP2	1.0	10.0	8.0	1.0	(12.0)	2.0	81.0	51.0
3	Ian Nyenhuis	Noah Nyenhuis	United States	1.0	4.0	(20.0)	3.0	(25.0 UFD)	10.0	1.0	4.0	7.0	5.0	10.0	6.0	8.0	104.0	59.0
4	Simon Karlemo	Lasse Lindell	Finland	6.0	(12.0)	(17.0)	11.0	1.0	12.0	3.0	8.0	9.0	9.0	2.0	11.0	1.0	102.0	73.0
5	Maximo Videla	Tadeo Funes de Rioja	Argentina	7.0	9.0	5.0	(19.0)	4.0	1.0	11.0	10.0	5.0	(16.0)	12.0	8.0	3.0	110.0	75.0
6	Alfonso Palumbo	Domenico Palumbo	Italy	(17.0)	10.0	9.0	1.0	2.0	11.0	(17.0)	7.0	15.0	7.0	13.0	4.0	6.0	119.0	85.0
7	Jens-Christian Dehn-Toftehøj	Carl Emil Sloth	Denmark	2.0	14.0	2.0	5.0	11.0	9.0	(19.0)	(16.0)	6.0	3.0	7.0	14.0	14.0	122.0	87.0
8	Ryotaro Udagawa	Kaito Suzuki	Japan	(22.0)	18.0	16.0	7.0	(20.0)	3.0	2.0	6.0	3.0	18.0	6.0	2.0	9.0	132.0	90.0
9	Lorenzo Ballestrin	Pedro Breternitz	Brazil	15.0	1.0	(21.0)	13.0	6.0	15.0	16.0	(25.0 DSQ)	1.0	1.0	3.0	7.0	17.0	141.0	95.0
10	JJ Klempen	Steven Hardee	United States Virgin Islands	4.0	5.0	(18.0)	16.0	9.0	7.0	(21.0)	15.0	11.0	10.0	9.0	9.0	12.0	146.0	107.0
11	Attila Tóth	Levente Borda	Hungary	9.0	11.0	6.0	15.0	17.0	8.0	(18.0)	13.0	17.0	2.0	(18.0)	5.0	5.0	144.0	108.0
12	Ben O’Shaughnessy	James Dwyer Matthews	Ireland	10.0	7.0	4.0	17.0	15.0	(21.0)	12.0	12.0	16.0	13.0	4.0	(20.0)	4.0	155.0	114.0
13	Carl Krause	Max Georgi	Germany	11.0	2.0	13.0	8.0	18.0	(22.0)	13.0	3.0	12.0	15.0	17.0	(25.0 DSQ)	11.0	170.0	123.0
14	Robbert Hidde Huisman	Frank Boer	Netherlands	5.0	8.0	14.0	12.0	10.0	(23.0)	9.0	21.0	18.0	6.0	(22.0)	3.0	18.0	169.0	124.0
15	Malcolm Björsson	Johan Bengtsson	Sweden	14.0	13.0	10.0	10.0	7.0	(19.0)	14.0	17.0	8.0	4.0	(23.0)	13.0	16.0	168.0	126.0
16	Leo Wilkinson	Sam Jones	United Kingdom	(19.0)	(19.0)	12.0	6.0	19.0	13.0	7.0	9.0	2.0	12.0	15.0	19.0 SP2	13.0	165.0	127.0
17	Tibor Nevelos	Adam Nevelos	Czech Republic	12.0	22.0	15.0	14.0	(25.0 UFD)	18.0	15.0	5.0	16.0 SP2	(25.0 DSQ)	5.0	10.0	10.0	192.0	142.0
18	Benjamín Guzmán Kennedy	Diego José Tessada Araya	Chile	21.0	(24.0)	(25.0 DNS)	9.0	3.0	16.0	6.0	18.0	20.0	20.0	14.0	18.0	15.0	209.0	160.0
19	Maksim Bondar	Danila Rerikh	Russia	8.0	20.0	19.0	20.0	14.0	2.0	(23.0)	14.0	23.0	19.0	8.0	15.0	(25.0 DSQ)	210.0	162.0
20	Gustaw Kwiek	Tomasz Santorowski	Poland	20.0	17.0	8.0	(21.0)	16.0	6.0	20.0	11.0	13.0	17.0	19.0	16.0	(25.0 BFD)	209.0	163.0
21	Jackson Macaulay	Andreas Steinitz	Canada	16.0	21.0	7.0	(24.0)	12.0	14.0	8.0	19.0	(22.0)	14.0	20.0	19.0	19.0	215.0	169.0
22	Markus Berthet	Rudolf Ugelstad	Norway	13.0	15.0	(22.0)	18.0	13.0	20.0	4.0	(23.0)	21.0	21.0	21.0	21.0	21.0	233.0	188.0
23	Antinio García	Martín Bartesagui	Uruguay	(24.0)	16.0	11.0	22.0	21.0	17.0	22.0	20.0	19.0	(23.0)	16.0	22.0	20.0	253.0	206.0
24	Nibras Al Awaisi	Ali Al Saadi	Oman	23.0	23.0	23.0	23.0	22.0	(24.0)	(24.0)	22.0	24.0	22.0	24.0	23.0	22.0	299.0	251.0
