= Slovenia at the 2024 Summer Olympics =

- IOC code: SLO
- NOC: Olympic Committee of Slovenia
- Website: www.olympic.si (in Slovene and English)

in Paris, France 26 July 2024 – 11 August 2024
- Competitors: 90 (46 men and 44 women) in 15 sports
- Flag bearers (opening): Benjamin Savšek and Ana Gros
- Flag bearers (closing): Toni Vodišek and Pia Babnik
- Medals Ranked 34th: Gold 2 Silver 1 Bronze 0 Total 3

Summer Olympics appearances (overview)
- 1992; 1996; 2000; 2004; 2008; 2012; 2016; 2020; 2024

Other related appearances
- Austria (1912); Yugoslavia (1920–1988)

Slovenia competed at the 2024 Summer Olympics in Paris from 26 July to 11 August 2024. It was the nation's ninth consecutive appearance at the Summer Olympics as an independent nation.

== Medalists ==
Medal	Name	Sport	Event	Date
Gold	Andreja Leški	Judo	Women's 63 kg	30 July
Gold	Janja Garnbret	Sport climbing	Women's combined	10 August
Silver	Toni Vodišek	Sailing	Men's Formula Kite	9 August

== Competitors ==
The following is the list of number of competitors in the Games.

Sport	Men	Women	Total
Archery	1	1	2
Athletics	2	5	7
Canoeing	2	2	4
Cycling	4	3	7
Golf	0	2	2
Gymnastics	0	2	2
Handball	14	14	28
Judo	1	5	6
Rowing	1	1	2
Sailing	3	3	6
Sport climbing	1	2	3
Swimming	1	4	5
Table tennis	3	0	3
Taekwondo	1	0	1
Volleyball	12	0	12
Total	46	44	90

== Archery ==
Slovenia entered two archers for Paris 2024. Žiga Ravnikar gained a quota for Slovenia by winning the bronze medal in the men's individual recurve at the 2024 European Olympic Qualification Tournament in Essen, Germany; meanwhile Žana Pintarič qualified for the games through the world ranking.

Athlete	Event	Ranking round		Round of 64	Round of 32	Round of 16	Quarterfinals	Semifinals	Final / BM	
Athlete	Event	Score	Seed	Opposition Score	Opposition Score	Opposition Score	Opposition Score	Opposition Score	Opposition Score	Rank
Žiga Ravnikar	Men's individual	663	31	Musolesi (ITA); L 4–6	Did not advance					
Žana Pintarič	Women's individual	638	46	Caetano (BRA); L 2–6	Did not advance					
Žiga Ravnikar; Žana Pintarič	Mixed team	1301	23	—N/a		Did not advance				23

== Athletics ==
Slovenian track and field athletes achieved the entry standards for Paris 2024, either by passing the direct qualifying mark (or time for track and road races) or by world ranking, in the following events (a maximum of 3 athletes each):

On July 2, 2024, Athletic Federation of Slovenia announced Maruša Mišmaš-Zrimšek skipping Olympics due to a muscle injury.

Key

- Note–Ranks given for track events are within the athlete's heat only
- Q = Qualified for the next round
- q = Qualified for the next round as a fastest loser or, in field events, by position without achieving the qualifying target
- NR = National record
- N/A = Round not applicable for the event
- Bye = Athlete not required to compete in round

Track and road events
Men

Athlete	Event	Heat		Repechage		Semifinal		Final	
Athlete	Event	Result	Rank	Result	Rank	Result	Rank	Result	Rank
Matic Ian Guček	400 m hurdles	50.30	7 R	49.06	4	Did not advance			

Women

Athlete	Event	Heat		Repechage		Semifinal		Final	
Athlete	Event	Result	Rank	Result	Rank	Result	Rank	Result	Rank
Anita Horvat	800 m	2:00.91	7	Did not advance					
Klara Lukan	5000 m	15:09.61	12	—N/a				Did not advance	
Klara Lukan	10000 m	—N/a		—N/a				31:45.15	20

Field events
Men

Athlete	Event	Qualification		Final	
Athlete	Event	Distance	Position	Distance	Position
Kristjan Čeh	Discus throw	64.80	9q	68.41	4

Women

Athlete	Event	Qualification		Final	
Athlete	Event	Distance	Position	Distance	Position
Tina Šutej	Pole vault	4.40	12q	4.40	19
Lia Apostolovski	High jump	1.83	26	Did not advance	
Neja Filipič	Triple jump	13.85	18	Did not advance	

== Canoeing ==
=== Slalom ===
Slovenia entered four boats into the slalom competition, for the Games through the 2023 European Games in Kraków, Poland, and 2023 ICF Canoe Slalom World Championships in London, Great Britain.

Athlete	Event	Preliminary						Semifinal		Final	
Athlete	Event	Run 1	Rank	Run 2	Rank	Best	Rank	Time	Rank	Time	Rank
Benjamin Savšek	Men's C-1	97.04	12	192.64	20	97.04	14	96.28	2	144.93	11
Peter Kauzer	Men's K-1	90.93	16	88.84	8	88.84	14	142.80	18	Did not advance	
Eva Alina Hočevar	Women's C-1	109.57	11	108.22	10	108.22	12	109.22	4	115.48	9
Eva Terčelj	Women's K-1	99.08	13	95.93	9	95.93	11	103.11	10	101.73	7

Kayak cross

Athlete	Event	Time trial		Round 1	Repechage	Heat	Quarterfinal	Semifinal	Final	
Athlete	Event	Time	Rank	Position	Position	Position	Position	Position	Position	Rank
Benjamin Savšek	Men's KX-1	74.18	25	4 R	2 Q	2 Q	3	Did not advance		12
Peter Kauzer	Men's KX-1	70.74 FLT (8)	37	3 R	2 Q	3	Did not advance			24
Eva Alina Hočevar	Women's KX-1	76.48	21	3 R	1 Q	4	Did not advance			29
Eva Terčelj	Women's KX-1	74.00	12	2 Q	Bye	3	Did not advance			18

== Cycling ==
=== Road ===
Slovenia entered a team of six road cyclists (four male and two female). Slovenia qualified four male and two female athletes through the UCI Nation Ranking and 2023 World Championships in Glasgow, Great Britain.

Men

Athlete	Event	Time	Rank
Domen Novak	Road race	DNF	–
Luka Mezgec	Road race	6:26:57	38
Matej Mohorič	Road race	DNF	–
Jan Tratnik	Road race	6:20:50	8
Jan Tratnik	Time trial	39:38.12	27

Women

Athlete	Event	Time	Rank
Eugenia Bujak	Road race	4:07:16	42
Eugenia Bujak	Time trial	42:54.96	16
Urša Pintar	Road race	4:08:14	59
Urša Pintar	Time trial	45:07.15	31

=== Mountain biking ===
Slovenian mountain bikers secured one female quota places for the Olympic through 2023 UCI Mountain Bike World Championships in Glasgow, Great Britain.

Athlete	Event	Time	Rank
Tanja Žakelj	Women's cross-country	LAP (2 laps)	30

== Golf ==
Slovenia entered two golfers into the Olympic tournament. Ana Belac qualified directly for the games in the women's individual competitions, based on her world ranking positions, on the IGF World Rankings. Pia Babnik qualified as a reserve after cancellations of other athletes or their failure to achieve internal requirements of their national federations.

Athlete	Event	Round 1	Round 2	Round 3	Round 4	Total		
Athlete	Event	Score	Score	Score	Score	Score	Par	Rank
Pia Babnik	Women's	74	66	74	73	287	−1	T22
Ana Belac	Women's	77	72	76	76	301	+13	T49

== Gymnastics ==
=== Artistic ===
Slovenia entered one female artistic gymnast into the games. Lucija Hribar qualified for the games by virtue of her individual results, through all-around event at the 2023 World Artistic Gymnastics Championships in Antwerp, Belgium.

Women

Athlete	Event	Qualification						Final					
Athlete	Event	Apparatus				Total	Rank	Apparatus				Total	Rank
Athlete	Event	V	UB	BB	F	Total	Rank	V	UB	BB	F	Total	Rank
Lucija Hribar	All-around	13.133	13.133	10.133	11.666	48.065	55	Did not advance					

=== Rhythmic ===
Slovenia entered one rhythmic gymnast into the individual all-around tournament by virtue of top fifteen eligible nation's results at the 2023 World Championships in Valencia, Spain.

Athlete	Event	Qualification						Final					
Athlete	Event	Hoop	Ball	Clubs	Ribbon	Total	Rank	Hoop	Ball	Clubs	Ribbon	Total	Rank
Ekaterina Vedeneeva	Individual	34.150 (7)	32.600 (11)	32.300 (8)	31.750 (8)	130.800	6 Q	34.100 (7)	31.950 (8)	33.150 (8)	32.700 (5)	131.900	6

== Handball ==
Summary

Key:

- ET: After extra time
- P – Match decided by penalty-shootout.

Team	Event	Group Stage						Quarterfinal	Semifinal	Final / BM	
Team	Event	Opposition Score	Opposition Score	Opposition Score	Opposition Score	Opposition Score	Rank	Opposition Score	Opposition Score	Opposition Score	Rank
Slovenia men's	Men's tournament	Spain; L 22–25	Croatia; W 31–29	Sweden; W 29–24	Japan; W 29–28	Germany; L 29–36	2	Norway; W 33–28	Denmark; L 30–31	Spain; L 22–23	4
Slovenia women's	Women's tournament	Denmark; L 19–27	South Korea; W 30–23	Germany; L 22–41	Norway; L 22–29	Sweden; L 23–27	6	Did not advance			11

=== Men's tournament ===
Slovenia men's national handball team qualified for the Olympics by securing a top two spot at the 2024 IHF Men's Olympic Qualification Tournaments in Granollers, Spain.

Team roster

A 21-player roster was announced on 3 June 2024. The final squad was revealed on 8 July 2024.

Head coach: Uroš Zorman

No.	Pos.	Name	Date of birth (age)	Height	App.	Goals	Club
3	P	Blaž Blagotinšek	17 January 1994 (aged 30)	2.05 m	134	240	(Germany) SG Flensburg-Handewitt
5	LB	Nik Henigman	4 December 1995 (aged 28)	2.01 m	76	105	(France) Saint-Raphaël Var
8	RW	Blaž Janc	20 November 1996 (aged 27)	1.86 m	101	366	(Spain) Barça
11	RB	Jure Dolenec	6 December 1988 (aged 35)	1.90 m	195	686	(France) Limoges Handball
17	RB	Nejc Cehte	4 September 1992 (aged 31)	1.96 m	72	129	(North Macedonia) Eurofarm Pelister
19	LW	Staš Slatinek Jovičić	6 December 2000 (aged 23)	1.88 m	25	59	(Slovenia) RD Slovan
20	LW	Tilen Kodrin	14 May 1994 (aged 30)	1.91 m	85	146	(Germany) VfL Gummersbach
22	P	Matej Gaber	22 July 1991 (aged 33)	1.98 m	142	208	(France) HBC Nantes
23	CB	Miha Zarabec	12 October 1991 (aged 32)	1.78 m	104	222	(Poland) Orlen Wisła Płock
26	GK	Klemen Ferlin	26 June 1989 (aged 35)	1.90 m	73	2	(Germany) HC Erlangen
27	P	Kristjan Horžen	8 December 1999 (aged 24)	1.92 m	44	64	(Germany) VfL Gummersbach
44	CB	Dean Bombač	4 April 1989 (aged 35)	1.89 m	129	272	(Hungary) ETO-SZESE Győr FKC
51	LB	Borut Mačkovšek	11 September 1992 (aged 31)	2.03 m	144	379	(Hungary) OTP Bank-Pick Szeged
77	RW	Domen Novak	26 April 1998 (aged 26)	1.82 m	37	76	(Germany) HSG Wetzlar
88	CB	Aleks Vlah	22 July 1997 (aged 27)	1.92 m	44	155	(Denmark) Aalborg Håndbold
90	GK	Urban Lesjak	24 August 1990 (aged 33)	1.88 m	85	0	(Slovenia) RK Trimo Trebnje
99	GK	Urh Kastelic	27 February 1996 (aged 28)	2.02 m	56	7	(Germany) TBV Lemgo

Group play

Pos	Team	Pld	W	D	L	GF	GA	GD	Pts	Qualification
1	Germany	5	4	0	1	162	144	+18	8	Quarterfinals
2	Slovenia	5	3	0	2	140	142	−2	6 (Note: Slovenia 2 Pts, +2 GD; Spain 2 Pts, 0 GD; Sweden 2 Pts, −2 GD.)	Quarterfinals
3	Spain	5	3	0	2	151	148	+3	6	Quarterfinals
4	Sweden	5	3	0	2	158	139	+19	6	Quarterfinals
5	Croatia	5	2	0	3	148	156	−8	4	
6	Japan	5	0	0	5	143	173	−30	0	

Source: Olympics Paris 2024 rankings
Rules for classification: 1) Points; 2) Head-to-head points; 3) Head-to-head goal difference; 4) Head-to-head goals scored; 5) Goal difference; 6) Goals scored; 7) Draw.
Notes:

27 July 2024; 09:00	Spain	25–22	Slovenia	Paris Expo Porte de Versailles, Paris; Attendance: 5,776; Referees: C. Bonaventura, J. Bonaventura (FRA)
27 July 2024; 09:00	Gómez 7	(8–11)	Bombač 5	Paris Expo Porte de Versailles, Paris; Attendance: 5,776; Referees: C. Bonaventura, J. Bonaventura (FRA)
27 July 2024; 09:00	3× (suspension)	Report	5× (suspension)	Paris Expo Porte de Versailles, Paris; Attendance: 5,776; Referees: C. Bonaventura, J. Bonaventura (FRA)

29 July 2024; 11:00	Slovenia	31–29	Croatia	Paris Expo Porte de Versailles, Paris; Attendance: 5,788; Referees: Nachevski, Nikolov (MKD)
29 July 2024; 11:00	Janc, Vlah 8	(13–13)	three players 5	Paris Expo Porte de Versailles, Paris; Attendance: 5,788; Referees: Nachevski, Nikolov (MKD)
29 July 2024; 11:00	1× (yellow card) 5× (suspension)	Report	1× (yellow card) 8× (suspension) 1× (red card)	Paris Expo Porte de Versailles, Paris; Attendance: 5,788; Referees: Nachevski, Nikolov (MKD)

31 July 2024; 16:00	Slovenia	29–24	Sweden	Paris Expo Porte de Versailles, Paris; Attendance: 5,813; Referees: Brunner, Salah (SUI)
31 July 2024; 16:00	Janc 10	(15–14)	Wanne 6	Paris Expo Porte de Versailles, Paris; Attendance: 5,813; Referees: Brunner, Salah (SUI)
31 July 2024; 16:00	1× (yellow card) 4× (suspension) 1× (red card)	Report	1× (yellow card) 3× (suspension) 1×	Paris Expo Porte de Versailles, Paris; Attendance: 5,813; Referees: Brunner, Salah (SUI)

2 August 2024; 19:00	Japan	28–29	Slovenia	Paris Expo Porte de Versailles, Paris; Attendance: 5,652; Referees: Hansen, Madsen (DEN)
2 August 2024; 19:00	Yasuhira 8	(15–15)	Vlah 14	Paris Expo Porte de Versailles, Paris; Attendance: 5,652; Referees: Hansen, Madsen (DEN)
2 August 2024; 19:00	7× (suspension)	Report	1× (yellow card) 6× (suspension)	Paris Expo Porte de Versailles, Paris; Attendance: 5,652; Referees: Hansen, Madsen (DEN)

4 August 2024; 14:00	Germany	36–29	Slovenia	Paris Expo Porte de Versailles, Paris; Attendance: 5,685; Referees: Jørum, Kleven (NOR)
4 August 2024; 14:00	Häfner 7	(23–14)	Horžen 7	Paris Expo Porte de Versailles, Paris; Attendance: 5,685; Referees: Jørum, Kleven (NOR)
4 August 2024; 14:00	1× (suspension)	Report	1× (suspension)	Paris Expo Porte de Versailles, Paris; Attendance: 5,685; Referees: Jørum, Kleven (NOR)

Quarterfinal

7 August 2024
09:30
Spain
29–28 (ET)
Egypt
Stade Pierre-Mauroy, Lille
Attendance: 25,697
Referees: Horáček, Novotný (CZE)
Gómez 9
(8–12)
Y. El-Deraa 8
2× (suspension)
Report
5× (suspension)

FT: 25–25 ET: 4–3

Semifinal

9 August 2024; 21:30	Slovenia	30–31	Denmark	Stade Pierre-Mauroy, Lille; Attendance: 22,329; Referees: Horáček, Novotný (CZE)
9 August 2024; 21:30	Bombač, Vlah 7	(10–15)	M. Landin 6	Stade Pierre-Mauroy, Lille; Attendance: 22,329; Referees: Horáček, Novotný (CZE)
9 August 2024; 21:30	3× (suspension)	Report	1× (suspension)	Stade Pierre-Mauroy, Lille; Attendance: 22,329; Referees: Horáček, Novotný (CZE)

Bronze medal game

11 August 2024; 09:00	Spain	23–22	Slovenia	Stade Pierre-Mauroy, Lille; Attendance: 17,242; Referees: Hansen, Madsen (DEN)
11 August 2024; 09:00	Gómez 5	(12–12)	Dolenec 6	Stade Pierre-Mauroy, Lille; Attendance: 17,242; Referees: Hansen, Madsen (DEN)
11 August 2024; 09:00	2× (yellow card) 2× (suspension)	Report	3× (suspension)	Stade Pierre-Mauroy, Lille; Attendance: 17,242; Referees: Hansen, Madsen (DEN)

=== Women's tournament ===
Slovenia women's national handball team qualified for the Olympics by securing a top two spot at the 2024 IHF Women's Olympic Qualification Tournaments in Neu-Ulm, Germany.

Team roster

A 20-player squad was announced on 3 June 2024. The final roster was revealed on 8 July 2024.

Head coach: (Montenegro) Dragan Adžić

No.	Pos.	Name	Date of birth (age)	Height	App.	Goals	Club
2	P	Valentina Klemenčič	5 February 2002 (aged 22)	1.85 m	45	57	(Slovenia) RK Krim
6	RB	Ana Gros	21 January 1991 (aged 33)	1.86 m	151	759	(Slovenia) RK Krim
7	CB	Elizabeth Omoregie	29 December 1996 (aged 27)	1.77 m	33	72	(Romania) CSM București
9	CB	Nina Spreitzer	4 March 1998 (aged 26)	1.77 m	67	32	(Slovenia) RK Krim
10	LB	Tjaša Stanko	5 November 1997 (aged 26)	1.73 m	105	440	(Slovenia) RK Krim
11	LB	Ana Abina	30 July 1997 (aged 26)	1.78 m	73	83	(Slovenia) ŽRK Ajdovščina
14	LW	Tamara Mavsar	1 April 1991 (aged 33)	1.73 m	102	388	(Slovenia) RK Krim
16	GK	Maja Vojnovič	26 January 1998 (aged 26)	1.80 m	73	1	(Slovenia) RK Krim
17	P	Nataša Ljepoja	28 January 1996 (aged 28)	1.79 m	73	147	(Romania) SCM Râmnicu Vâlcea
20	RW	Alja Varagić	11 December 1990 (aged 33)	1.85 m	99	229	(Slovenia) RK Krim
21	GK	Amra Pandžić	20 September 1989 (aged 34)	1.78 m	101	2	(Slovenia) RK Krim
25	RB	Barbara Lazović	4 January 1988 (aged 36)	1.83 m	105	321	(Slovenia) RK Krim
28	LW	Maja Svetik	9 March 1996 (aged 28)	1.68 m	60	68	(Austria) BT Füchse
35	LB	Ema Hrvatin	4 January 2000 (aged 24)	1.78 m	23	29	(France) Saint-Amand
88	LW	Ema Abina	18 February 1999 (aged 25)	1.71 m	32	36	(Slovenia) RK Krim

Group play

Pos	Team	Pld	W	D	L	GF	GA	GD	Pts	Qualification
1	Norway	5	4	0	1	140	110	+30	8 (Note: Norway 2 Pts, +5 GD; Sweden 2 Pts, +2 GD; Denmark 2 Pts, −7 GD.)	Quarterfinals
2	Sweden	5	4	0	1	140	125	+15	8	Quarterfinals
3	Denmark	5	4	0	1	126	116	+10	8	Quarterfinals
4	Germany	5	1	0	4	136	134	+2	2 (Note: Germany 2 Pts, +18 GD; South Korea 2 Pts, −6 GD; Slovenia 2 Pts, −12 GD.)	Quarterfinals
5	South Korea	5	1	0	4	107	133	−26	2	
6	Slovenia	5	1	0	4	116	147	−31	2	

Source: Olympics Paris 2024 rankings
Rules for classification: 1) Points; 2) Head-to-head points; 3) Head-to-head goal difference; 4) Head-to-head goals scored; 5) Goal difference; 6) Goals scored; 7) Draw.
Notes:

25 July 2024; 09:00	Slovenia	19–27	Denmark	Paris Expo Porte de Versailles, Paris; Attendance: 5,686; Referees: Brunner, Salah (SUI)
25 July 2024; 09:00	Gros, Stanko 5	(11–14)	Friis, Østergaard 5	Paris Expo Porte de Versailles, Paris; Attendance: 5,686; Referees: Brunner, Salah (SUI)
25 July 2024; 09:00	1× (yellow card) 6× (suspension)	Report	1× (yellow card) 5× (suspension)	Paris Expo Porte de Versailles, Paris; Attendance: 5,686; Referees: Brunner, Salah (SUI)

28 July 2024; 11:00	South Korea	23–30	Slovenia	Paris Expo Porte de Versailles, Paris; Attendance: 5,819; Referees: Bíró, Kiss (HUN)
28 July 2024; 11:00	Woo 7	(12–14)	Mavsar 7	Paris Expo Porte de Versailles, Paris; Attendance: 5,819; Referees: Bíró, Kiss (HUN)
28 July 2024; 11:00	1× (yellow card) 2× (suspension)	Report	1× (suspension)	Paris Expo Porte de Versailles, Paris; Attendance: 5,819; Referees: Bíró, Kiss (HUN)

30 July 2024; 09:00	Germany	41–22	Slovenia	Paris Expo Porte de Versailles, Paris; Attendance: 5,852; Referees: García, Paolantoni (ARG)
30 July 2024; 09:00	Lott, Smits 7	(16–9)	Gros 6	Paris Expo Porte de Versailles, Paris; Attendance: 5,852; Referees: García, Paolantoni (ARG)
30 July 2024; 09:00	1× (yellow card) 4× (suspension)	Report	1× (yellow card) 4× (suspension)	Paris Expo Porte de Versailles, Paris; Attendance: 5,852; Referees: García, Paolantoni (ARG)

1 August 2024; 21:00	Slovenia	22–29	Norway	Paris Expo Porte de Versailles, Paris; Attendance: 5,722; Referees: Belkhiri, Hamidi (ALG)
1 August 2024; 21:00	Gros, Mavsar 5	(10–15)	three players 4	Paris Expo Porte de Versailles, Paris; Attendance: 5,722; Referees: Belkhiri, Hamidi (ALG)
1 August 2024; 21:00	1× (yellow card) 4× (suspension)	Report	2× (suspension) 1× (red card)	Paris Expo Porte de Versailles, Paris; Attendance: 5,722; Referees: Belkhiri, Hamidi (ALG)

3 August 2024; 16:00	Slovenia	23–27	Sweden	Paris Expo Porte de Versailles, Paris; Attendance: 5,801; Referees: Brunner, Salah (SUI)
3 August 2024; 16:00	Omoregie 9	(14–11)	Hagman 5	Paris Expo Porte de Versailles, Paris; Attendance: 5,801; Referees: Brunner, Salah (SUI)
3 August 2024; 16:00	2× (suspension)	Report	1× (suspension)	Paris Expo Porte de Versailles, Paris; Attendance: 5,801; Referees: Brunner, Salah (SUI)

== Judo ==
Slovenia qualified six judokas for the following weight classes at the Games. Maruša Štangar (women's extra-lightweight, 48 kg), Kaja Kajzer (women's lightweight, 57 kg), Andreja Leški (women's half-middleweight, 63 kg), Anka Pogačnik (women's middleweight, 70 kg), and Metka Lobnik (women's half-heavyweight, 78 kg) got qualified via quota based on IJF World Ranking List and continental quota based on Olympic point rankings. Enej Marinič obtained invitation from International Judo Federation being the first reserve on the ranking of judokas in men's competition (half-heavyweight, 100 kg).

Men

Athlete	Event	Round of 32	Round of 16	Quarterfinals	Semifinals	Repechage	Final / BM	
Athlete	Event	Opposition Result	Opposition Result	Opposition Result	Opposition Result	Opposition Result	Opposition Result	Rank
Enej Marinič	Men's +100 kg	Tataroğlu (TUR); L 00–11	Did not advance					

Women

Athlete	Event	Round of 32	Round of 16	Quarterfinals	Semifinals	Repechage	Final / BM	
Athlete	Event	Opposition Result	Opposition Result	Opposition Result	Opposition Result	Opposition Result	Opposition Result	Rank
Maruša Štangar	Women's −48 kg	Nikolić (SRB); L 00–01	Did not advance					
Kaja Kajzer	Women's −57 kg	Nelson-Levy (ISR); L 00–01	Did not advance					
Andreja Leški	Women's −63 kg	Askilashvili (GEO); W 10–00	Belkadi (ALG); W 10–01	Beauchemin-Pinard (CAN); W 01–00	Agbegnenou (FRA); W 01–00	Bye	Awiti Alcaraz (MEX); W 10–01	1st place, gold medalist(s)
Anka Pogačnik	Women's −70 kg	Memneloum (CHA); W 10–00	Tsunoda (ESP); L 00–01	Did not advance				
Metka Lobnik	Women's −78 kg	Kuka (KOS); L 00–10	Did not advance					

== Rowing ==
Slovenian rowers qualified two boats in following classes through the 2024 World Rowing Olympic & Paralympic Qualification Regatta in Lucerne, Switzerland.

Athlete	Event	Heats		Repechage		Quarterfinals		Semifinals		Final	
Athlete	Event	Time	Rank	Time	Rank	Time	Rank	Time	Rank	Time	Rank
Isak Žvegelj	Men's single sculls	7:01.23	4 R	7:06.90	1 QF	7:06:42	5 SC/D	7:09.41	4 FD	6:59.46	22
Nina Kostanjšek	Women's single sculls	7:46.30	3 QF	Bye		7:56.31	5 SC/D	7:48.86	2 FC	7:39.00	18

Qualification Legend: FA=Final A (medal); FB=Final B (non-medal); FC=Final C (non-medal); FD=Final D (non-medal); FE=Final E (non-medal); FF=Final F (non-medal); SA/B=Semifinals A/B; SC/D=Semifinals C/D; SE/F=Semifinals E/F; QF=Quarterfinals; R=Repechage

== Sailing ==
Toni Vodišek qualified through the 2023 Sailing World Championships in The Hague, Netherlands. At the 2024 ILCA Senior European Championships in Athens, Greece, Žan Luka Zelko clinched norm in ILCA 7 event. Lina Eržen qualified in IQFoil category through the Last Chance Regatta in Hyères, France. At the same event, Jakob Božič and Tina Mrak acquired their olympic berth in Mixed 470 and Lin Pletikos in Women's ILCA 6 class.

Elimination events

Athlete	Event	Race																											Final rank
Athlete	Event	1	2	3	4	5	6	7	8	9	10	11	12	13	14	QF	SF1	SF2	SF3	SF4	SF5	SF6	F1	F2	F3	F4	F5	F6	Final rank
Toni Vodišek	Men's Formula Kite	2	5	1	3	~~10~~	1	~~12~~	—N/a								Bye						SCP; 5	DPI; 4.1	4	—N/a			2nd place, silver medalist(s)
Lina Eržen	Women's iQFoil	14	13	17	7	9	19	9	23	~~24~~	19	23	UFD; ~~25~~	10	17	Did not advance													21

Medal race events

Athlete	Event	Race										Net points	Final rank
Athlete	Event	1	2	3	4	5	6	7	8	9	M*	Net points	Final rank
Žan Luka Zelko	Men's ILCA 7	27	10	~~33~~	23	2	21	14	16	—N/a	EL	113	17
Lin Pletikos	Women's ILCA 6	31	9	~~38~~	17	37	35	22	22	17	EL	190	28
Jakob Božič; Tina Mrak	Mixed 470	15	8	17	~~18~~	17	15	10	17	—N/a	EL	99	17

M = Medal race; EL = Eliminated – did not advance into the medal race

== Sport climbing ==
Slovenia entered three sport climbers into the Olympic tournament. Janja Garnbret qualified directly for the women's boulder & lead combined event, by winning the gold medal and securing one of the three berths at the 2023 IFSC World Championships in Bern, Switzerland. Mia Krampl and Luka Potočar earned their quota on June 22, 2024, qualifying through the 2024 Olympic Qualifier Series in Budapest, Hungary.

Boulder & lead combined

Athlete	Event	Qualification						Final					
Athlete	Event	Boulder		Lead		Total	Rank	Boulder		Lead		Total	Rank
Athlete	Event	Result	Place	Result	Place	Total	Rank	Result	Place	Result	Place	Total	Rank
Luka Potočar	Men's	19.6	17	24.0	=11	43.6	16	Did not advance					
Janja Garnbret	Women's	99.6	1	96.1	=1	195.7	1 Q	84.4	1	84.1	3	168.5	1st place, gold medalist(s)
Mia Krampl	Women's	28.4	17	51.1	=10	79.5	17	Did not advance					

== Swimming ==
Slovenia's women's 4 × 100 metre freestyle relay qualified on February 11, 2024, having one of the thirteen best combined fastest times at both the 2023 and 2024 World Championships, the latter being FINA's qualification criterium. With the result of 3:41.72, Neža Klančar, Katja Fain, Janja Šegel and Hana Sekuti finished eighth at the 2024 World Aquatics Championships. Sekuti was later replaced by Tjaša Pintar to complete the women's 4 × 100 metre freestyle relay.

Neža Klančar achieved qualifying norm for the 50 m freestyle event on December 3, 2023, with the result of 24.70, which was enough for the second place at the 2023 Rotterdam Qualification Meet.

Athlete	Event	Heat		Semifinal		Final	
Athlete	Event	Time	Rank	Time	Rank	Time	Rank
Sašo Boškan	Men's 200 m freestyle	1:48.75	21	Did not advance			
Neža Klančar	Women's 50 m freestyle	24.64	=11 Q	24.40	=7 Q	24.35 NR	6
Neža Klančar	Women's 100 m freestyle	54.12	7 Q	53.96 NR	6	Did not advance	
Neža Klančar; Janja Šegel; Katja Fain; Tjaša Pintar	Women's 4 × 100 m freestyle relay	3:41.29	14	—N/a		Did not advance	

== Table tennis ==
Slovenia entered a full squad of male athletes into the Games. Their national men's senior team qualified ranking 11th on the ITTF World Team Ranking released on March 4, 2024, enabling participation of men's team as well as two single berths in men's singles tournament.

Men

Athlete	Event	Preliminary	Round 1	Round 2	Round 3	Round of 16	Quarterfinals	Semifinals	Final / BM	
Athlete	Event	Opposition Result	Opposition Result	Opposition Result	Opposition Result	Opposition Result	Opposition Result	Opposition Result	Opposition Result	Rank
Darko Jorgić	Singles	—N/a	—N/a	Quek (SGP); W 4–2	Pitchford (GBR); W 4–2	Lin (TPE); L 0–4	Did not advance			
Deni Kožul	Singles	—N/a	—N/a	Achanta (IND); W 4–2	Togami (JPN); L 2–4	Did not advance				
Darko Jorgić; Deni Kožul; Peter Hribar	Team	—N/a				France; L 0–3	Did not advance			

== Taekwondo ==
Slovenia qualified one athlete to compete at the games. Patrik Divkovič qualified for Paris 2024 by advancing to the final round of 2024 European Taekwondo Olympic Qualification Tournament in Sofia, Bulgaria.

Athlete	Event	Qualification	Round of 16	Quarterfinals	Semifinals	Repechage	Final / BM	
Athlete	Event	Opposition Result	Opposition Result	Opposition Result	Opposition Result	Opposition Result	Opposition Result	Rank
Patrik Divkovič	Men's +80 kg	Bye	Ordemann (NOR); L 1–2	Did not advance				=11

== Volleyball ==
=== Indoor ===
Summary

Team	Event	Group stage				Quarterfinal	Semifinal	Final / BM	
Team	Event	Opposition Score	Opposition Score	Opposition Score	Rank	Opposition Score	Opposition Score	Opposition Score	Rank
Slovenia men's	Men's tournament	Canada; W 3–1	Serbia; W 3–0	France; W 3–2	1	Poland; L 1–3	Did not advance		5

==== Men's tournament ====
Slovenia men's volleyball team qualified by their rank in the World Ranking qualification pathway.

Team roster

The roster was announced on 8 July 2024.

Head coach: (Romania) Gheorghe Crețu

- 1 Tonček Štern OP
- 2 Alen Pajenk MB
- 4 Jan Kozamernik MB
- 9 Dejan Vinčić S
- 10 Sašo Štalekar MB
- 13 Jani Kovačič L
- 14 Žiga Štern OH
- 16 Gregor Ropret S
- 17 Tine Urnaut (c) OH
- 18 Klemen Čebulj OH
- 19 Rok Možič OH
- 20 Nik Mujanović OP

Group play

Pos	Team	Pld	W	L	Pts	SW	SL	SR	SPW	SPL	SPR	Qualification
1	Slovenia	3	3	0	8	9	3	3.000	282	252	1.119	Quarterfinals
2	France (H)	3	2	1	6	8	5	1.600	290	260	1.115	Quarterfinals
3	Serbia	3	1	2	3	5	8	0.625	256	293	0.874	
4	Canada	3	0	3	1	3	9	0.333	254	277	0.917	

Source: Olympics
Rules for classification: Tiebreakers
(H) Host

28 July 2024; 21:00	Slovenia	3–1	Canada	South Paris Arena 1, Paris; Attendance: 9,381; Referees: Wojciech Maroszek (POL), Wael Kandil (EGY)
28 July 2024; 21:00	(25–21, 25–20, 20–25, 25–21); P2 Report			South Paris Arena 1, Paris; Attendance: 9,381; Referees: Wojciech Maroszek (POL), Wael Kandil (EGY)

30 July 2024; 17:00	Slovenia	3–0	Serbia	South Paris Arena 1, Paris; Attendance: 9,138; Referees: Denny Cespedes (DOM), Stefano Cesare (ITA)
30 July 2024; 17:00	(25–21, 25–19, 25–19); P2 Report			South Paris Arena 1, Paris; Attendance: 9,138; Referees: Denny Cespedes (DOM), Stefano Cesare (ITA)

2 August 2024; 17:00	France	2–3	Slovenia	South Paris Arena 1, Paris; Attendance: 9,505; Referees: Vladimir Simonović (SUI), Wojciech Maroszek (POL)
2 August 2024; 17:00	(20–25, 23–25, 27–25, 25–22, 11–15); P2 Report			South Paris Arena 1, Paris; Attendance: 9,505; Referees: Vladimir Simonović (SUI), Wojciech Maroszek (POL)

Quarterfinal

5 August 2024; 09:00	Slovenia	1–3	Poland	South Paris Arena 1, Paris; Attendance: 9,274; Referees: Scott Dziewirz (CAN), Stefano Cesare (ITA)
5 August 2024; 09:00	(20–25, 26–24, 19–25, 20–25); P2 Report			South Paris Arena 1, Paris; Attendance: 9,274; Referees: Scott Dziewirz (CAN), Stefano Cesare (ITA)

== See also ==
- Slovenia at the 2024 Winter Youth Olympics
