= Ana Abina =

Slovenian handball player

Personal information
- Nationality: Slovenian
- Born: 30 July 1997 (age 29) Ljubljana, Slovenia
- Height: 1.75 m (5 ft 9 in)

Sport
- Sport: Handball
- Position: Left wing
- Current club: ŽRK Krka
- Number: 9

Senior clubs
- Years: Team
- 2015–2018: RK Krim
- 2018–2020: ŽRK Krka
- 2021–: ŽRK Mlinotest Ajdovščina
National team
| Years | Team | Apps | (Gls) |
| 2016– | Slovenia | 99 | (157) |
Medal record
Mediterranean Games
| Bronze medal – third place | 2018 Tarragona | Team |
- Updated on 11 November 2026

Ana Abina (born 30 July 1997) is a Slovenian handball player for ŽRK Krka and the Slovenian national team. She earned a bronze medal with the Slovenian team at the 2018 Mediterranean Games.

Abina also competed for Slovenia at the 2024 Summer Olympics.

She is the sister of Ema Abina.

== International honours ==
- EHF Cup Winners' Cup:
  - Semifinalist: 2016
