= Ema Abina =

Slovenian handball player

Personal information
- Nationality: Slovenian
- Born: 18 February 1999 (age 27) Ljubljana, Slovenia
- Height: 1.70 m (5 ft 7 in)

Sport
- Sport: Handball
- Position: Left wing
- Current club: RK Krim
- Number: 8
National team
Years	Team	Apps	(Gls)
2020–	Slovenia	61	(79)
- Updated on 11 November 2026

Ema Abina (born 18 February 1999) is a Slovenian handball player for RK Krim and the Slovenian national team. She is the sister of Ana Abina.

She represented Slovenia at the 2020 European Women's Handball Championship.

Abina competed for Slovenia at the 2024 Summer Olympics.

She is a sister of Ana Abina.
