= Sailing at the 2023 Pan American Games – Men's kite =

Men's kite at the 2023 Pan American Games
- Venue: Cofradia Nautica del Pacifico
- Dates: October 28 - November 3
- Competitors: 9 from 9 nations

Medalists
| Gold medal | Bruno Lobo | Brazil |
| Silver medal | Tiger Tyson | Antigua and Barbuda |
| Bronze medal | Deury Corniel | Dominican Republic |

The men's kite competition of the sailing events at the 2023 Pan American Games in Santiago was held from October 28 to November 3 at the Cofradia Nautica del Pacifico.

Points were assigned based on the finishing position in each race (1 for first, 2 for second, etc.). The points were totaled from the top 13 results of the first 16 races, with lower totals being better. If a sailor was disqualified or did not complete the race, 10 points were assigned for that race (as there were 9 sailors in this competition). The top 4 sailors at that point competed in the final race.

Bruno Lobo from Brazil dominated the regatta to finish ahead of his opponents for the title. Tiger Tyson from Antigua and Barbuda was the runner-up and Deury Corniel from Dominican Republic received the bronze medal.

== Schedule ==
All times are (UTC-3).

| Date | Time | Round |
|---|---|---|
| October 28, 2023 | 13:20 | Races 1, 2, 3 and 4 |
| October 30, 2023 | 12:33 | Races 5, 6, 7 and 8 |
| October 31, 2023 | 13:11 | Races 9, 10, 11 and 12 |
| November 2, 2023 | 13:12 | Races 13, 14, 15 and 16 |
| November 3, 2023 | 13:00 | Medal race |

== Results ==
The results were as below.
Race M is the medal race.

| Rank | Athlete | Nation | Race | | | | | | | | | | | | | | | | | Total Points | Net Points |
| Rank | Athlete | Nation | 1 | 2 | 3 | 4 | 5 | 6 | 7 | 8 | 9 | 10 | 11 | 12 | 13 | 14 | 15 | 16 | M | Total Points | Net Points |
|---|---|---|---|---|---|---|---|---|---|---|---|---|---|---|---|---|---|---|---|---|---|
| 1st place, gold medalist(s) | Bruno Lobo | Brazil | 1 | 1 | 1 | (10); DNF | 1 | 1 | 1 | 1 | 1 | 1 | 1 | 1 | 1 | 1 | 1 | 1 | 1 | 25 | 13 |
| 2nd place, silver medalist(s) | Tiger Tyson | Antigua and Barbuda | 2 | 3 | 3 | 3 | 3 | (4) | 2 | 3 | 2 | 2 | 2 | 3 | (6) | (7) | 3 | 3 | 2 | 51 | 34 |
| 3rd place, bronze medalist(s) | Deury Corniel | Dominican Republic | 3 | (4) | 4 | 2 | 2 | 3 | 4 | 2 | 4 | 3 | 3 | 4 | (5) | 2 | 4 | (5) | 3 | 54 | 40 |
| 4 | Markus Edegran | United States | (10); DSQ | 2 | 2 | 1 | 4 | 2 | 3 | (7) | 3 | 5 | 4 | 2 | 2 | 3 | (10); DSQ | 2 | 4 | 62 | 35 |
| 5 | Xantos Villegas | Mexico | 4 | 5 | 5 | 4 | 5 | (7) | 6 | 4 | 5 | 4 | (10); DNF | 7 | 4 | (10); DNC | 6 | 4 | 5 | 90 | 63 |
| 6 | Victor Bolaños | Colombia | 5 | 6 | 6 | 6 | 6 | (10); DNF | (8) | 5 | (7) | 6 | 5 | 6 | 3 | 4 | 2 | 6 | 6 | 91 | 66 |
| 7 | James Morrin | Canada | 6 | (7) | 7 | 5 | 7 | 5 | 5 | 6 | 6 | 7 | 6 | 5 | 7 | 5 | (10); UFD | (8) | 7 | 102 | 77 |
| 8 | Raúl Aguilar | Argentina | 7 | (8) | (8) | 7 | 8 | 6 | 7 | 8 | 8 | 8 | 7 | (10); DNF | 8 | 6 | 5 | 7 | 8 | 118 | 92 |
| 9 | Giorgio Cristi | Chile | (10); DNC | (9) | (9) | 8 | 9 | 8 | 9 | 9 | 9 | 9 | 8 | 8 | 9 | 8 | 7 | 9 | 9 | 138 | 110 |
