= Sailing at the 2022 Asian Games – Men's Formula Kite =

Men's Formula Kite at the 2022 Asian Games
- Venue: Xiangshan Sailing Centre
- Date: 21–27 September 2023
- Competitors: 7 from 7 nations

Medalists
| gold medal | Max Maeder | Singapore |
| silver medal | Zhang Haoran | China |
| bronze medal | Joseph Weston | Thailand |

The men's Formula Kite competition at the 2022 Asian Games was held from 21 to 27 September 2023 at Xiangshan Sailing Centre in Ningbo.

Points were assigned based on the finishing position in each race (1 for first, 2 for second, etc.). The points were totaled from the top 13 results of the first 16 races, with lower totals being better. The top two competitors from the opening series advanced directly to the final, while the next four moved to the semifinal.

== Schedule ==
All times are China Standard Time (UTC+08:00)

| Date | Time | Event |
|---|---|---|
| Thursday, 21 September 2023 | 14:04 | Race 1–4 |
| Friday, 22 September 2023 | 11:00 | Race 5–8 |
| Saturday, 23 September 2023 | 14:04 | Race 9–12 |
| Sunday, 24 September 2023 | 11:00 | Race 13–14 |
| Monday, 25 September 2023 | 14:04 | Race 15–16 |
| Wednesday, 27 September 2023 | 12:00 | Semifinal |
| Wednesday, 27 September 2023 | 12:00 | Final |

== Results ==
Legend

- DSQ — Disqualification
- RET — Retired
- UFD — U flag disqualification

=== Opening series ===
| Rank | Athlete | Race | | | | | | | | | | | | | | | | Total |
| Rank | Athlete | 1 | 2 | 3 | 4 | 5 | 6 | 7 | 8 | 9 | 10 | 11 | 12 | 13 | 14 | 15 | 16 | Total |
|---|---|---|---|---|---|---|---|---|---|---|---|---|---|---|---|---|---|---|
| 1 | Max Maeder (SGP) | ~~(1)~~ | ~~(1)~~ | ~~(1)~~ | 1 | 1 | 1 | 1 | 1 | 1 | 1 | 1 | 1 | 1 | 1 | 1 | 1 | 13 |
| 2 | Zhang Haoran (CHN) | ~~(2)~~ | ~~(2)~~ | 2 | 2 | 2 | ~~(8)~~; UFD | 2 | 2 | 2 | 2 | 2 | 2 | 2 | 2 | 2 | 2 | 26 |
| 3 | Joseph Weston (THA) | ~~(3)~~ | ~~(3)~~ | ~~(3)~~ | 3 | 3 | 2 | 3 | 3 | 3 | 3 | 3 | 3 | 3 | 3 | 3 | 3 | 38 |
| 4 | Rune Miyoshi (JPN) | 4 | 5 | 4 | ~~(6)~~ | 4 | ~~(8)~~; RET | 4 | 4 | 5 | 6 | 4 | 6 | 4 | 4 | 5 | ~~(8)~~; RET | 59 |
| 5 | Leung Po Chak (HKG) | 5 | ~~(6)~~ | 6 | 5 | ~~(8)~~; RET | 3 | 5 | 6 | 6 | 4 | ~~(7)~~ | 5 | 5 | 6 | 4 | 4 | 64 |
| 6 | Cho Su-cheol (KOR) | 7 | 4 | 5 | 4 | 6 | 4 | ~~(8)~~; DSQ | ~~(8)~~; DSQ | 4 | 7 | 5 | 4 | 6 | 5 | ~~(8)~~; RET | 8 RET | 69 |
| 7 | Chitresh Tatha (IND) | 6 | ~~(7)~~ | ~~(7)~~ | ~~(7)~~ | 5 | 5 | 6 | 5 | 7 | 5 | 6 | 7 | 7 | 7 | 6 | 5 | 77 |

=== Semifinal ===
| Rank | Athlete | CF | Total |
|---|---|---|---|
| 3rd place, bronze medalist(s) | Joseph Weston (THA) | 2 | |
| 4 | Rune Miyoshi (JPN) | 1 | |
| 5 | Leung Po Chak (HKG) | | |
| 6 | Cho Su-cheol (KOR) | | |

=== Final ===
| Rank | Athlete | CF | Total |
|---|---|---|---|
| 1st place, gold medalist(s) | Max Maeder (SGP) | 2 | |
| 2nd place, silver medalist(s) | Zhang Haoran (CHN) | 1 | |
| | X | | |
| | X | | |

- No medal races were completed on 27th September as the wind conditions in the course area did not meet the requirement of racing. The medals were awarded based on the opening series ranking.
