= Connor Bainbridge =

British kitesurfer (born 1993)

Personal information
- Full name: Connor Rowan Bainbridge
- Born: 7 October 1993 (age 33) Reading, England

Sailing career
- Sport: Sailing
- Club: Halifax Sailing Club
- Class: Kitesurfing
Medal record
Formula Kite
Representing Great Britain
World Championships
Silver medal – second place	2019 Campione del Garda	Formula Kite
European Championships
Gold medal – first place	2019 Torregrande	Mixed team relay
Gold medal – first place	2020 Traunsee	Mixed team relay
Silver medal – second place	2020 Puck	Formula Kite

Connor Rowan Bainbridge (born 7 October 1993) is a British kitesurfer.

He won a silver medal at the Formula Kite World Championships in 2019 and three medals at the Formula Kite European Championships: gold medals in the mixed team relay in 2019 and 2020, and a silver medal in the Formula Kite event in 2020.

He competed at the inaugural Olympic men's Formula Kite event at the 2024 Summer Olympics, reaching the semi final where he missed the final. He made his Olympic debut on a board he designed himself.
