= Bruno Lobo =

Brazilian kite surfer

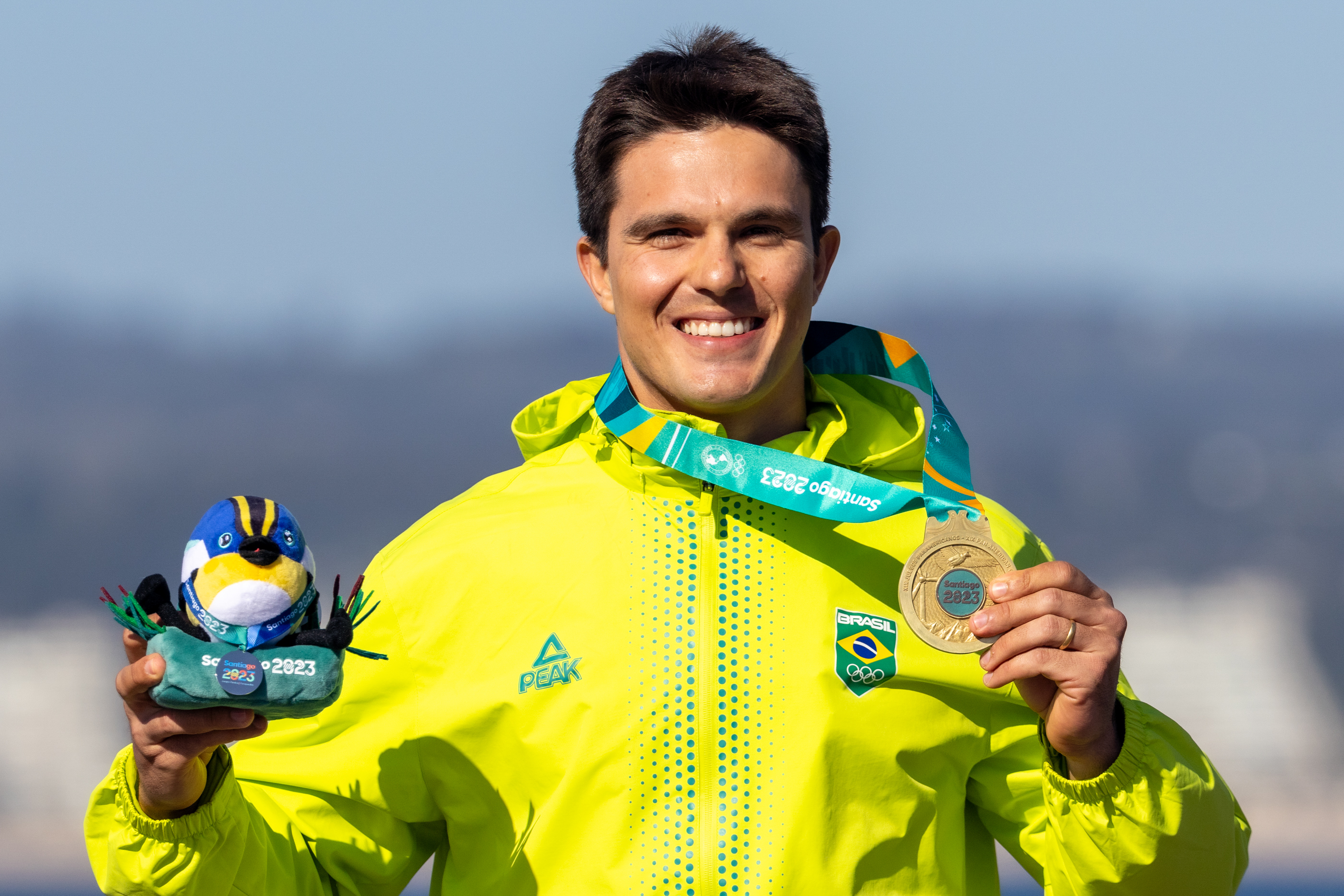
- Lobo in 2023

Personal information
- Born: 26 July 1993 (age 32) São Luís, Maranhão, Brazil
- Height: 184 cm (6 ft 0 in)
- Weight: 92 kg (203 lb)

Sailing career
- Sport: Sailing
- Class: Kite
Medal record
Sailing
Representing Brazil
Pan American Games
Gold medal – first place	2019 Lima	Men's kite
Gold medal – first place	2023 Santiago	Men's kite

Bruno Lobo (born 26 July 1993) is a Brazilian kitesurfer and orthopedic doctor.

== Early career ==
Bruno began his sporting career in swimming from a young age. He was the Maranhão champion in his category several times, competing in regional and national competitions, and was a member of the Brazilian swimming team. At the age of 15 he switched to triathlon, in which he was Brazilian champion in the 16–17 age category, 3 times champion of Maranhão and was part of the Brazilian team competing for a place in the Youth Olympic Games.

== Senior career ==
Amid some injuries, he entered medical school and started kitesurfing in 2010. Combining training with studies, he was the Brazilian formula kite champion in 2016, and in 2023, he already had 6 Brazilian titles. In 2017, he graduated in medicine.

At the 2019 Pan American Games held in Lima, Peru, he won a gold medal in the Men's kite.

At the 2023 Pan American Games held in Santiago, Chile, he won a gold medal in the Men's kite.

The gold medal at Pan 2023 crowned a great season for Lobo. He had secured a guaranteed place at the 2024 Summer Olympics after placing in the Top 10 in the Formula Kite event at the 2023 Sailing World Championships, which took place in August, in the Netherlands. Bruno achieved fifth place in the Olympic test event, held in July, at Marseille Marina, in France; being the only athlete from South America in the competition. Before his performance at the World Cup and the Olympic test event, Lobo participated at the Allianz Regatta, an event valid as a stage of the Sailing World Cup and held at the beginning of June, in Lelystad, Netherlands. In April, Bruno was the best athlete in the Americas, ranked seventh among countries and also achieved 11th place in the general classification of the Trofeo Princesa Sofía, one of the most traditional sailing events, in Palma de Mallorca, Spain.

== Heroism ==
In January 2025, while training off the coast of São Luís, Brazil, Lobo rescued the drowning 15-year-old girl Maria Eduarda Silva at sea. Lobo heard cries for help and used his kiteboarding equipment to reach the girl, who was exhausted and struggling to stay afloat. He carried her back to shore, where lifeguards attended to her.
