= 2021 Youth Sailing World Championships =

Event title
- Edition: 50th

Event details
- Venue: Al-Musannah, Oman
- Dates: 11 - 18 December 2021

The 2021 Youth Sailing World Championships took place in Al-Musannah, Oman from 11 to 18 December. It was the 50th edition of the Youth Sailing World Championships.

== Competition format ==
=== Events and equipment ===
Event	Equipment
Boy's dinghy (single hander)	ILCA 6
Boy's skiff	29er
Boy's windsurfer	Techno 293+
Boy's kitesurfer	Formula Kite
Girl's dinghy (single hander)	ILCA 6
Girl's dinghy (double hander)	420
Girl's skiff	29er
Girl's windsurfer	Techno 293+
Girl's kitesurfer	Formula Kite
Male/Mixed dinghy (double hander) (Note: Male/mixed. Male pairings allowed, mixed parings allowed, female pairings not allowed)	420
Mixed Multihull	Nacra 15

== Summary ==
=== Medal table ===
* Host nation (Oman)

Rank	Nation	Gold	Silver	Bronze	Total
1	France	3	0	3	6
2	Spain	1	2	1	4
3	Great Britain	1	1	0	2
3	Italy	1	1	0	2
5	Israel	1	0	1	2
6	Bermuda	1	0	0	1
6	Germany	1	0	0	1
6	Peru	1	0	0	1
6	Singapore	1	0	0	1
10	United States	0	3	1	4
11	Slovenia	0	1	1	2
11	Switzerland	0	1	1	2
13	Czech Republic	0	1	0	1
13	Poland	0	1	0	1
15	Portugal	0	0	1	1
15	Russia	0	0	1	1
15	Turkey	0	0	1	1
Totals (17 entries)		11	11	11	33

=== Event medalists ===
==== Men's events ====
Event	First	Second	Third
ILCA 6	Sebastian Kempe; Bermuda	Luka Zabukovec; Slovenia	José Gomes Saraiva Mendes; Portugal
29er	Hugo Revil; Karl Devaux; France	Mateo Codoñer Alemany; Simon Codoñer Alemany; Spain	Ian Nyenhuis; Noah Nyenhuis; United States
Techno 293+	Federico Alan Pilloni; Italy	Boris Shaw; Great Britain	Ozan Turker; Turkey
Formula Kite	Maximilian Maeder; Singapore	Riccardo Pianosi; Italy	Mikhail Novikov; Russia

==== Women's events ====
Event	First	Second	Third
ILCA 6	Florencia Chiarella; Peru	Anja von Allmen; Switzerland	Théa Lubac; France
420	Neus Ballester Bover; Andrea Perello Mora; Spain	Vanessa Lahrkamp; Katherine McNamara; United States	Manon Pennaneac'h; Victoire Lerat; France
29er	Emily Mueller; Florence Brellisford; Great Britain	Charlie Leigh; Sophie Fisher; United States	Alja Petric; Katja Filipic; Slovenia
Techno 293+	Manon Pianazza; France	Kristyna Chalupnikova; Czech Republic	Zoe Fernandez de Bobadilla Ramos; Spain
Formula Kite	Gal Zukerman; Israel	Julia Damasiewicz; Poland	Héloïse Pégourié; France

==== Mixed events ====
Event	First	Second	Third
Nacra 15	Thomas Proust; Eloïse Clabon; France	Kay Brunsvold; Cooper Delbridge; United States	Axel Grandjean; Noémie Fehlmann; Switzerland
420 (Note: Male/mixed. Male pairings allowed, mixed parings allowed, female pairings not allowed)	Florian Krauss; Jannis Summchen; Germany	Ian Clive Walker March; Finn Dicke; Spain	Roi Levy; Ariel Gal; Israel
