= Tiger Tyson (sailor) =

Antiguan kiteboarder (born 2002)

Personal information
- Full name: Tiger Peter Cyril Tyson
- Nationality: Antigua and Barbuda
- Born: 8 May 2002 (age 24) Auckland, New Zealand

Sailing career
- Country: Antigua and Barbuda
- Sport: Sailing
- Class(es): IKA Formula Kite, IKA Kite Foil, IKA Twin Tip Racing
Medal record
Men's sailing
Representing Antigua and Barbuda
Pan American Games
Silver medal – second place	2023 Santiago	Formula Kite

Tiger Peter Cyril Tyson (born 8 May 2002) is a New Zealand born Antiguan kiteboarder. Born in Auckland, he moved to Antigua when he was two years old and started kitesurfing when he was seven. He had watched the Olympics when he was twelve years old and wanted to qualify for an Olympic Games. He qualified for the 2018 Summer Youth Olympics and placed seventh.

Tyson competed in his first Formula Kite World Championship in 2021 and competed at two subsequent editions. He had ranked as high as fourteenth in the world, then had to drop out of university for his preparations for the 2024 Summer Olympics. He qualified for the Summer Games after he had won a silver medal in the men's kite event at the 2023 Pan American Games. At the 2024 Summer Games, he placed seventeenth.

== Early life ==
Tiger Peter Cyril Tyson was born on 8 May 2002 in Auckland, New Zealand. His father Mick was a captain of a superyacht while his stepmother Pammie is a rower who had participated in the World's Toughest Row. The family settled in Antigua when Tiger was two years old after traveling to multiple locations by boat. There, he began kitesurfing at seven years of age and surfed together with his father.

When Tyson was ten years old, he watched the table tennis events at the 2012 Summer Olympics in London and wanted to qualify for an Olympic Games. Once he had learned that kitesurfing was going to be a medal event at the 2018 Summer Youth Olympics in Buenos Aires, he started training seriously at the age of thirteen in hopes to qualify. He was trained by world champion Andre Philips.

== Career ==
Tyson qualified for the 2018 Summer Youth Olympics after placing first at the North American & Caribbean Qualification Tournament in Cabarete, Dominican Republic. During the final race, he had initially placed fourth in the other races though his opponents' halyard got tangled and he eventually took over and won the race, earning the quota by just 0.1 of a point. At the Games, he was designated as the flagbearer for the opening ceremony. He competed at the IKA Twin Tip Racing event from 9 to 14 October. He placed seventh out of the twelve people that competed; Deury Corniel of the Dominican Republic won the event. At the 2019 French National Championships, Tyson won the gold medal in the U19 Kitefoiling event.

He competed in his first Formula Kite World Championship in 2021 and placed 89th. In 2022, he competed at the 2022 Formula Kite World Championship and placed 44th. He was ranked fourteenth in the world after a silver medal winning finish at the Brazil Sailing Cup. In the same year, he dropped out of university to focus on Olympic qualification. He started his Olympic qualification run in 2023 at the 2023 Formula Kite World Championships, though he placed 27th. He qualified for the 2024 Summer Olympics after he had won the silver medal in the men's kite event at the 2023 Pan American Games.

At the 2024 Summer Olympics, he competed in the men's formula kite. During his run at the Games, he had placed as high as ninth. The ninth until the sixteenth races were cancelled due to wind issues, and was then placed 17th overall in the event.
