= Max Maeder =

Singaporean kitefoiler (born 2006)

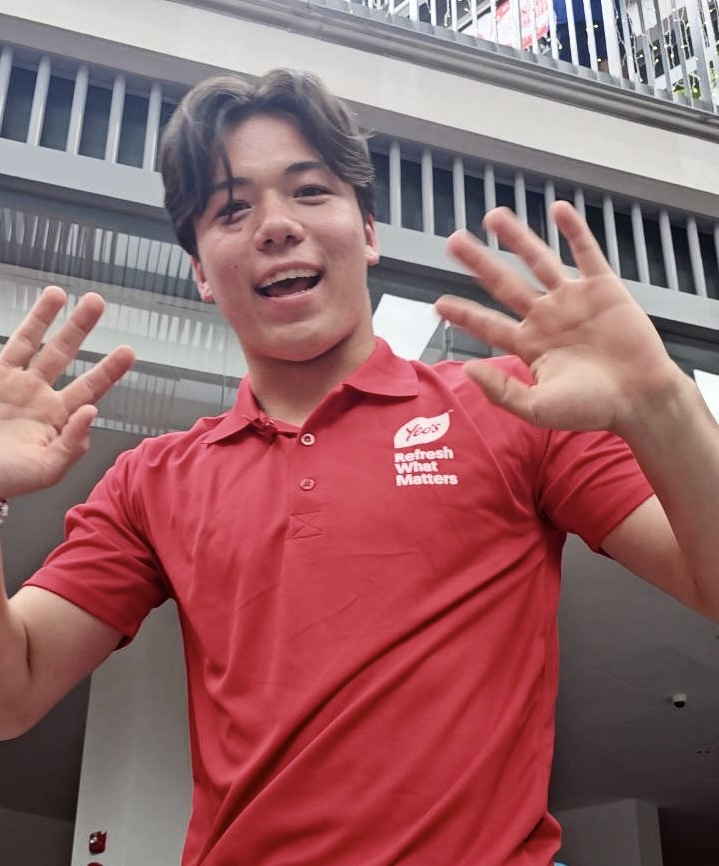
- Maeder in 2024

Personal information
- Full name: Maximilian Maeder
- Born: 12 September 2006 (age 20) Singapore
- Height: 1.80 m (5 ft 11 in)
- Weight: 91 kg (201 lb)

Sport
- Country: Singapore
- Rank: 1 (3 September 2024)
- Event: Men's Kite
- Coached by: John Dolenc
Medal record
Men's Formula Kite
Representing Singapore
Event	1st	2nd	3rd
Olympic Games	-	–	1
World Championships	2	1	–
Asian Games	1	-	–
European Championships	2	-	-
Asian Championships	4	1	-
SEA Games	1	-	-
Youth Sailing World Championships	3	-	-
Youth World Championships	4	-	-
KiteFoil World Series	5	1	-
Total	22	3	1
Olympic Games
Bronze medal – third place	2024 Paris	Formula Kite
World Championships
Gold medal – first place	2024 Hyères	Formula Kite
Gold medal – first place	2023 The Hague	Formula Kite
Silver medal – second place	2022 Cagliari	Formula Kite
Asian Games
Gold medal – first place	2022 Hangzhou	Formula Kite
European Championships
Gold medal – first place	2022 Nafpaktos	Open
Gold medal – first place	2021 Montpellier	Open
Asian Championships
Gold medal – first place	2024 Daishan	Open
Silver medal – second place	2023 Shenzhen	Open
Gold medal – first place	2022 Pattaya	Open
Gold medal – first place	2019 Beihai	Asian
Gold medal – first place	2018 Zhuhai	Asian
Pan American Championships
Gold medal – first place	2022 São Luís	Open
SEA Games
Gold medal – first place	2025 Thailand	Formula Kite
Youth Sailing World Championships
Gold medal – first place	2023 Búzois	Formula Kite
Gold medal – first place	2022 The Hague	Formula Kite
Gold medal – first place	2021 Mussanah	Formula Kite
IKA Youth World Championships
Gold medal – first place	2023 Hang Loose	U21 & U19
Gold medal – first place	2022 Torregrande	U21
Gold medal – first place	2021 Hang Loose	U19
Gold medal – first place	2019 Pascucci	U19
KiteFoil World Series
Gold medal – first place	2024 Traunsee	Formula Kite
Gold medal – first place	2023 Zhuhai	Formula Kite
Gold medal – first place	2023 Cagliari	Formula Kite
Gold medal – first place	2023 Traunsee	Formula Kite
Silver medal – second place	2022 Traunsee	Formula Kite
Gold medal – first place	2021 Fuerteventura	Formula Kite

Maximilian Maeder (Note: His name is sometimes transliterated to 墨士廉 (pinyin: Mò Shìlián) in Singapore's Chinese-language media.) OLY (born 12 September 2006) is a Singaporean Formula Kite professional athlete. He is the reigning Formula Kite World, Asiad, Asian and European champion. He holds the distinction of being the youngest winner in any Olympic sailing class competition, achieving this at the age of 17.

Maeder competed at the 2024 Summer Olympics in the inaugural Men's Formula Kite event, where he reached the finals and won the bronze medal, becoming the country's second native-born Olympic medalist. Maeder is also a three-time youth world sailing champion in consecutive years from 2021 to 2023 and won various open championships across Europe, Asia and Pan America. Since the 2021 European Championships, he has consistently secured podium finishes in every competition he has entered.

== Early life ==
Maeder was born in Singapore to a family with mixed Eurasian heritage. His father, Valentin Maeder, is a Swiss German and his mother, Hwee Keng (née Teng) Maeder, is Singaporean Chinese. He is the oldest among his siblings and has two younger brothers. At the age of six, his father introduced him to kiteboarding before encouraging him to venture into kitefoiling, a more advanced form of the sport, when he was 10. By the age of 11, Maeder had already competed in his first competitive pro race.

== Career ==
=== 2018–2021: Early career and World No.1 ===
Maeder's achievements began when he won his first competitive tournament in the Formula Kite Asian Championships at Zhuhai in 2018. He later emerged victorious at various tournaments such as the 2021 Formula Kite Youth World Championships (U19), Formula Kite Individual European Championships, Youth Sailing World Championships and KiteFoil World Series. He also took part in his first Formula Kite World Championships in the same year, where he finished fifth. On 20 September 2021, Maeder achieved his highest IKA - Formula Kite men's ranking of World No.1.

=== 2022: World Championships silver ===
In 2022, success continued to follow with his second Formula Kite Youth World Championships (U21), Youth Sailing World Championships and Formula Kite Individual European Championships titles, as well his first Formula Kite Asia-Pacific Championships, Formula Kite Pan American Championships and Semaine Olympique Francaise De Voile victories. In his second appearance at the Formula Kite World Championships, he finished as runner-up to Slovenia's Toni Vodišek.

=== 2023: World and Asian Champions ===
In 2023, Maeder began his new season by winning the World Cup Series held on the Spanish island of Mallorca. In July, he achieved a significant milestone by capturing his third consecutive Formula Kite Youth World Championships victory. Additionally, in August, Maeder also secured his first Formula Kite World Championships title. This accomplishment came as he defeated his rival, Toni Vodišek, and set a new record as the youngest winner in any Olympic sailing class competition, all at the age of 16. Maeder good form continued at the delayed 2022 Asian Games where he won Singapore's first gold medal at the quadrennial games. He finished the season strongly by winning the KiteFoil World Series and clinching his third Youth Sailing World Championships title.

=== 2024: Consecutive World title and Olympic debut ===
Maeder, who was ranked 6th in the world at the time, opened the 2024 season by winning the European Championships. He followed this success with victories at the World Cup Series and the Semaine Olympique Française De Voile. In May, he claimed his second Formula Kite World Championships title by overcoming Italy's Riccardo Pianosi, the world's top-ranked Formula Kite men's sailor, who finished in second place ahead of Austria's Valentin Bontus. That same year, Maeder debuted at the 2024 Summer Olympics in Paris, competing in the Men's Formula Kite. There, he won a bronze medal on 9 August 2024, Singapore's National Day, becoming the youngest Olympic medalist of Singapore at the age of 17. In September, Maeder returns to competing, finishing first place in KiteFoil World Series Austria and 2024 KiteFoil Asian Championships in Daishan, China.

== Business and industry endorsements ==
Maeder is endorsed by several kitesurf and water sports gear companies such as Levitaz, WIP and Flysurfer. In 2024, he also helped the development of his foil and kite with Levitaz and Flysurfer.

Maeder has represented Singaporean beverage brand, Yeo's (Yeo Hiap Seng), as a brand ambassador since 2022. He has appeared advertisements for the brand, including digital and physical advertisements for the brand's "New Pioneers" campaign prior the olympics in 2024, as well as a special edition beverage can featuring Maeder. Yeo's also hosted meet & greet sessions for fans of Maeder. Maeder's partnership with Yeo's aligned with a 3-year-sponsorship agreement with the Ng Teng Fong Charitable Foundation, founded by the son of the creator of Far East Organisation, which is the parent company of Yeo's. Maeder has represented Swiss watch brand, Norqain, as a brand ambassador since 2022. Singaporean bank, DBS, announced a four-and-a-half-year collaboration with Maeder. He has appeared in the brand's "Trust Your Spark" campaign in 2024, and took part in private and public engagement sessions hosted by DBS.

== Personal life ==
Maeder was born on 12 September 2006 in Singapore to Valentin and Hwee Keng (née Teng) Maeder. His father is a Swiss, and his mother is a Chinese Singaporean. He has two younger brothers, Karl and Valentin Jr., who are respectively 2 and 9 years younger.

Maeder grew up in a multilingual household; in addition to his native English, Maeder also understands Mandarin, German, Swiss German and French. He said that his linguistic abilities, particularly in Mandarin, are a result of his mother's persistent effort in ignoring anything he said in any language other than Mandarin. Maeder was homeschooled growing up.

Although Maeder had dual nationality of Swiss and Singaporean by birth, he chose to compete for Singapore at the age of 11. He compared the choice of what country to represent with choosing one cuisine to eat for the rest of his life. He stated, "It felt like choosing between chicken rice and cheese fondue" and it was a "easy choice" for him to pick chicken rice (standing for Singapore). His brother Karl Maeder is also a kitefoiler who is representing Switzerland and is on the Swiss Youth Kite Sailing team.

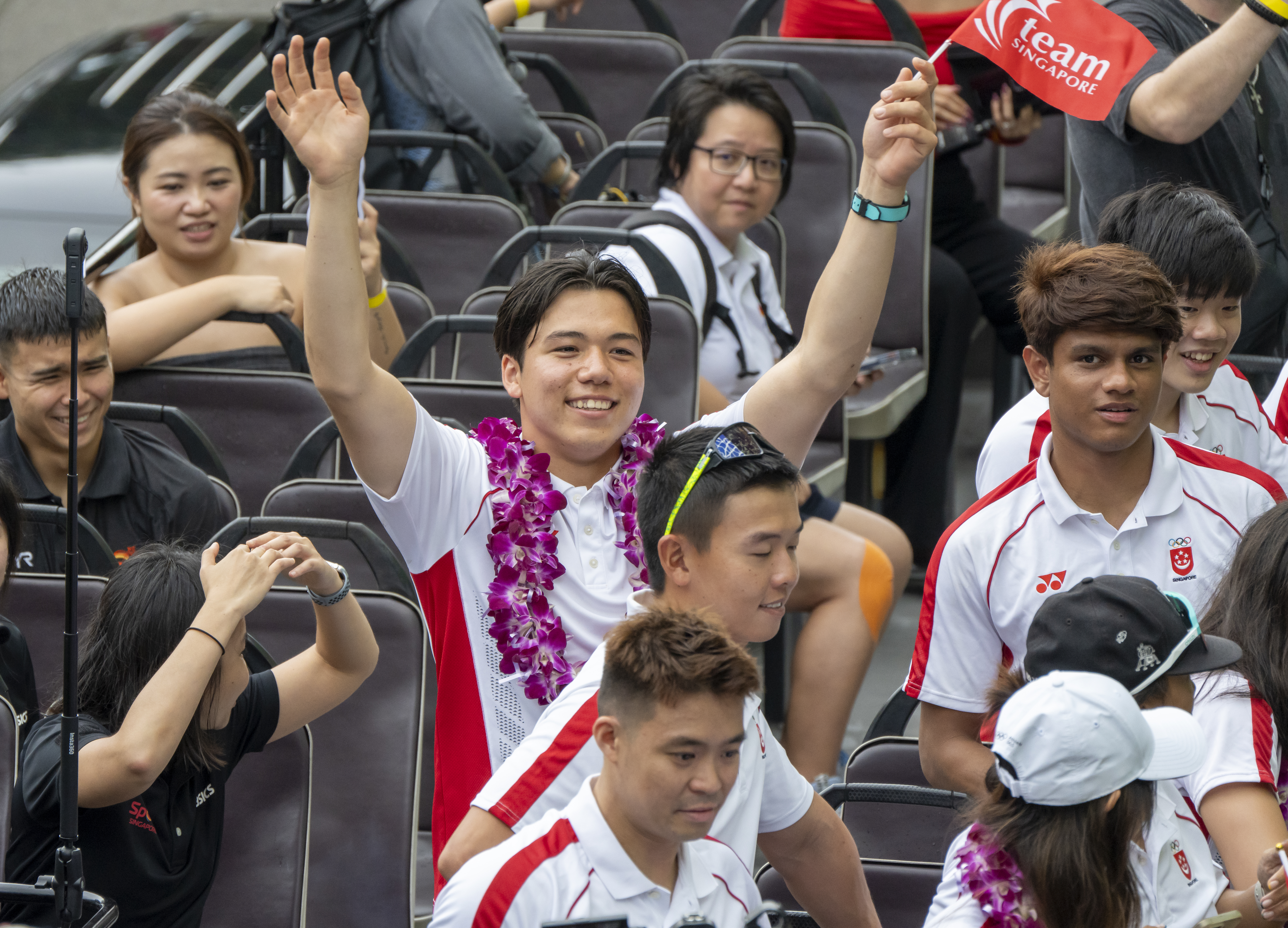
Maeder with other Singapore Olympians at the open-top bus parade in 2024

In his free time, Maeder enjoys a form of chess mode called "chess puzzles" and has told that his chess puzzle points on Chess.com is 2650. It is his superstition to base his performance in the race on how he did for his chess puzzles on the day. Maeder has been dating an unnamed Singaporean national swimmer since August 2024.

In 2024, he was granted a deferment from his National Service (NS) obligations where he could continue to train and compete until after the 2028 Summer Olympics.

After the 2024 Paris Olympics, Maeder and 9 other Singaporean Olympians participated in an open-top bus parade.

== Awards and nominations ==
The list of nominations for awards received by and awards won by Maeder are as follows:

- Nominated for The Straits Times' Athlete of the Year 2021
- Nominated for The Straits Times' Athlete of the Year 2022
- Won the SNOC Sportsboy of the Year 2022
- Won the SNOC Sportsboy of the Year 2023
- Nominated for Rolex World Sailor of the Year 2023
- Won the SNOC Sportsboy of the Year 2024
- Won Young World Sailor of the Year 2024
- Won the Rolex World Sailor of the Year 2026

== See also ==
- List of Singapore world champions in sports
