= Huang Qibin =

Chinese Olympic sailor (born 2006)

Personal information
- Native name: 黄齐滨 (Chinese)
- Nationality: China
- Born: Qibin Huang; 5 July 2006 (age 19) Harbin, Heilongjiang, China

Sailing career
- Sport: Sailing
- Club: China National Sailing and Windsurfing Team
- Class: Formula Kite
Medal record
Men's sailing
Representing China
Continental Championships
Gold medal – first place	2023 Asian & Oceania	Formula Kite
Silver medal – second place	2022 Asia-Pacific	Formula Kite
Youth World Championships
Silver medal – second place	2023 Gizzeria	Formula Kite

Huang Qibin OLY (Chinese: 黄齐滨, born July 5, 2006) is a Chinese Formula Kite professional sailing athlete. He became the Asian & Oceania champion In 2023.

In August 2023, Huang qualified for the Paris Olympics by finishing 7th overall and entering the men's medal series at the 2023 Sailing World Championships. In December 2023, he secured the bronze medal in the men's category at the Zhuhai Grand Final of the 2023 Kitefoil World Series. On June 2, 2024, Huang was selected for the China National Sailing and Windsurfing Team to compete in the Paris Olympics.

In August, 2024, Huang placed 10th place in the Olympic Men's Kite category.

== Early life ==
Huang's interest in sports started with snowboarding at the age of 6, after that, he came in contact with kite skiing. Huang started kiteboarding at the age of 8 under the guidance of his father. As his talent in the sport became evident, his father, Huang Wensheng, took him to Hua Hin, Thailand, where he pursued both his studies and training.

== National titles ==
In 2019, he won the Beihai stage of the 2019 National Kiteboarding Championship.

In 2021, Huang won the men's individual course racing, mixed relay course racing, and mixed long-distance titles at the National Kiteboarding Championship. On September 10, he clinched the men's hydrofoil kiteboarding title at the sailing competition of the 14th National Games of the People's Republic of China (Weifang Division). On December 19, at the 2021 National Sailing Championship and National Kiteboarding Championship, Huang dominated the men's hydrofoil kiteboarding course racing and long-distance events, winning all nine rounds.

In October, he finished third in the men's hydrofoil long-distance race at the 2023 National Kiteboarding Championship and National Youth Kiteboarding Championship. On October 19, he won the U21 men's hydrofoil course racing and U21 men's hydrofoil long-distance titles.

In July, at the 2024 National Kiteboarding Championship, Huang won the U21 men's hydrofoil long-distance, U21 men's hydrofoil slalom, and U21 men's hydrofoil course racing titles. He also secured runner-up positions in the men's hydrofoil long-distance, slalom, and course racing events.

== International career ==
=== 2019: Early career ===
In 2019, Huang secured the runner-up position in the men's hydrofoil category at the Asian Kiteboarding Championship.

=== 2022–2023: International breakthrough and Olympic qualification ===
On May 25, 2022, he won the silver medal at the 2022 Torregrande Kitefoiling Youth World Championship.

In August 2023, Huang finished 7th in the men's medal series at the 2023 Sailing World Championships, earning a qualification spot for the 2024 Paris Olympics. On November 26, he won the men's hydrofoil title at the 2023 Asian-Oceanic Formula Kite Championships and Asian-Oceanic Kiteboarding Open. In December, he secured the bronze medal in the men's category at the Zhuhai Grand Final of KiteFoil World Series.

=== 2024: Olympic debut and beyond ===
On June 2, 2024, Huang was selected for the China National Sailing and Windsurfing Team to compete in the Paris Olympics. In August, 2024, Huang placed 10th place in the Olympic Men's Kite category.
