= Riccardo Pianosi =

Italian kitesurfer (born 2005)

Personal information
- Nationality: Italian
- Born: 1 March 2005 (age 21) Pesaro, Italy

Sailing career
- Sport: Sailing
- Class: Formula Kite
Medal record
Men's sailing
Representing Italy
World Championships
Silver medal – second place	2024 Hyères	Formula Kite
Bronze medal – third place	2021 Torregrande	Formula Kite
European Championships
Gold medal – first place	2023 Portsmouth	Formula Kite
Bronze medal – third place	2024 Los Alcázares	Formula Kite

Riccardo Pianosi (born 1 March 2005) is an Italian kitesurfer who competes in the Formula Kite category. He won two medals in the Formula Kite World Championship, in 2021 and 2024, and two medals in the Formula Kite European Championship, in 2023 and 2024.

== Early life ==
Riccardo Pianosi was born on 1 March 2005 in Pesaro, Marche.

== Career ==
Pianosi took part in the 2021 Formula Kite World Championships, where he won the bronze medal. He won the 2023 Formula Kite European Championships in Portsmouth beating the French Maxime Nocher and compatriot Lorenzo Boschetti.

The 2024 season began for Pianosi by winning the bronze medal at the European Championships, finishing behind Maximilian Maeder and Axel Mazella, both of whom took gold and silver respectively. In May 2024, Pianasi, the world's top-ranked Formula Kite men's sailor, won the silver medal Formula Kite World Championships, having finished in second place ahead of Austria's Valentin Bontus. That same year, Pianosi debuted at the 2024 Summer Olympics in Paris, competing in the Men's Formula Kite.
