= Deury Corniel =

Dominican Republic kitesurfer (born 2000)

Deury Corniel Javier
Personal information
- Nationality: Dominican Republic
- Born: 12 May 2000 (age 26) Cabarete, Puerto Plata, Dominican Republic
Medal record
Representing the DOM
Youth Olympic Games
| Gold medal – first place | 2018 Buenos Aires | IKA Twin Tip Racing |
Pan American Games
| Bronze medal – third place | 2023 Santiago | Kite |

Deury Corniel Javier (born 12 May 2000) is a Dominican kitesurfer who won gold at the 2018 Youth Olympic Games in the IKA Twin Tip Racing event and became youth world champion in the 2017. He is also a two time Freestyle vice world champion.

Corniel received the Dominican Republic Athlete of Year award in 2019 and won the bronze medal in kite representing the Dominican Republic at the 2023 Pan American Games. He is sponsored by Red Bull.
