= Toni Vodišek =

Slovenian kitesurfer (born 2000)

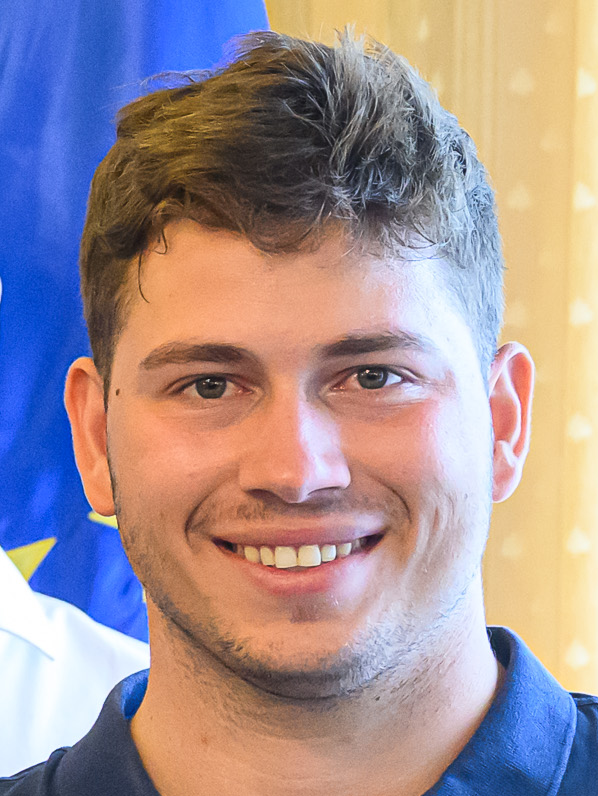
- Vodišek in 2024

Personal information
- Born: 7 June 2000 (age 26) Izola, Slovenia
- Height: 180 cm (5 ft 11 in)
- Weight: 82 kg (181 lb)
- Website: tonivodisek.com

Sailing career
- Sport: Sailing
- Class: Kitesurfing
Competition record
Representing Slovenia
Olympic Games
Silver medal – second place	2024 Paris	Formula Kite
World Championships
Gold medal – first place	2022 Cagliari	Formula Kite

Toni Vodišek (born 7 June 2000) is a Slovenian kitesurfer. Vodišek won the Formula Kite World Championship in 2022. He competed at the 2024 Summer Olympics in the inaugural men's Formula Kite event, where he reached the finals and won the silver medal.

== Biography ==
Vodišek was born on 7 June 2000 in Izola, Slovenia. His father was also a kitesurfer, described as one of the "pioneers" of the sport in Slovenia. His father had attempted to make the 2012 Summer Olympics when kitesurfing was in consideration for the games, but his career ended due to injury. Vodišek's first experience in the sport came at age six, and by age nine he started competing in competitions, in the freestyle discipline. He later changed to kite racing. He recalled that when his father was injured and "couldn't continue ... The equipment was in the garage and he said, 'now you do it.'"

In 2015, at the age of 15, Vodišek was the European and world junior runner-up and qualified for the 2015 ISAF Sailing World Cup, where he reached the finals of the Formula Kite event. Then, from 2016 to 2018, he won three straight European and world junior championships; he also competed in senior competitions, placing sixth at the 2017 world championships and seventh at the 2018 World Cup. Vodišek was selected to represent Slovenia at the 2018 Summer Youth Olympics, where he won a silver medal and was the Slovenian flagbearer.

Vodišek won silver in Formula Kite at the 2019 senior European championships, the first-ever medal for Slovenia at the event. He also won three World Series competitions that year. In 2020, he competed with his sister, Marina, at the European mixed team championship, placing 10th. He won one World Series title during the 2021 season. He won the European championship and later his first World Championship in 2022.

Vodišek was runner-up at the World Championships in 2023, which qualified him for the 2024 Summer Olympics, the first time Formula Kite was featured at the games. He was named the 2023 Slovenian Sailor of the Year. He reached the finals of the 2024 World Championships. At the Olympics, he reached the finals and ultimately won the silver medal, behind Valentin Bontus of Austria. He served as the flagbearer for Slovenia at the closing Olympic ceremony.
