= Valentin Bontus =

Austrian kitesurfer

Personal information
- Born: 1 February 2001 (age 25) Perchtoldsdorf, Austria

Sailing career
- Sport: Sailing
- Club: Yacht Club Podersdorf
- Coached by: Luca Bursic
- Class: Kitesurfing
Competition record
Representing Austria
Olympic Games
Gold medal – first place	2024 Paris	Formula Kite

Valentin Bontus (born 1 February 2001) is an Austrian kitesurfer. He competed at the 2024 Summer Olympics in the inaugural men's Formula Kite event, where he reached the finals and won the gold medal.

== Biography ==
Bontus was born on 1 February 2001 in Perchtoldsdorf, Austria. He was introduced to kitesurfing at age six, competing in freestyle and big air events. He also played football as a youth, being a member of the club UNION Soccerclub Perchtoldsdorf through the U15 level. In 2020, he suffered two torn ligaments in his knee, which led to him switching to racing as the landings when doing tricks in freestyle and big air hurt his knees.

Bontus, a member of the Yacht Club Podersdorf, began the switch to racing in 2021: "I called the Austrian Federation in the summer of 2021 and said I was interested in aiming for the Olympics. At my first event I had no clue about anything to do with racing. I didn't even know how to press 'start' on my watch, and as for laylines, what were they! I actually Googled 'laylines' to find out what the coach was talking about."

Initially competing with the Levitaz foil package, Bontus switched to Chubanga and his performances improved. He began being coached by Luca Bursic in 2022 and in 2023, he placed fourth at the World Championships, thus qualifying for the inaugural men's Formula Kite event at the 2024 Summer Olympics. At the European Championships in March 2024, he took fourth place. He won the bronze medal at the World Championships in May 2024, becoming the first medalist for Austria at the competition since 2018. At the Olympics, Bontus won the opening race, the first in Olympic history, and later won the finals with 3 consecutive victories to win the gold medal.
